= Catholic Church in Sichuan =

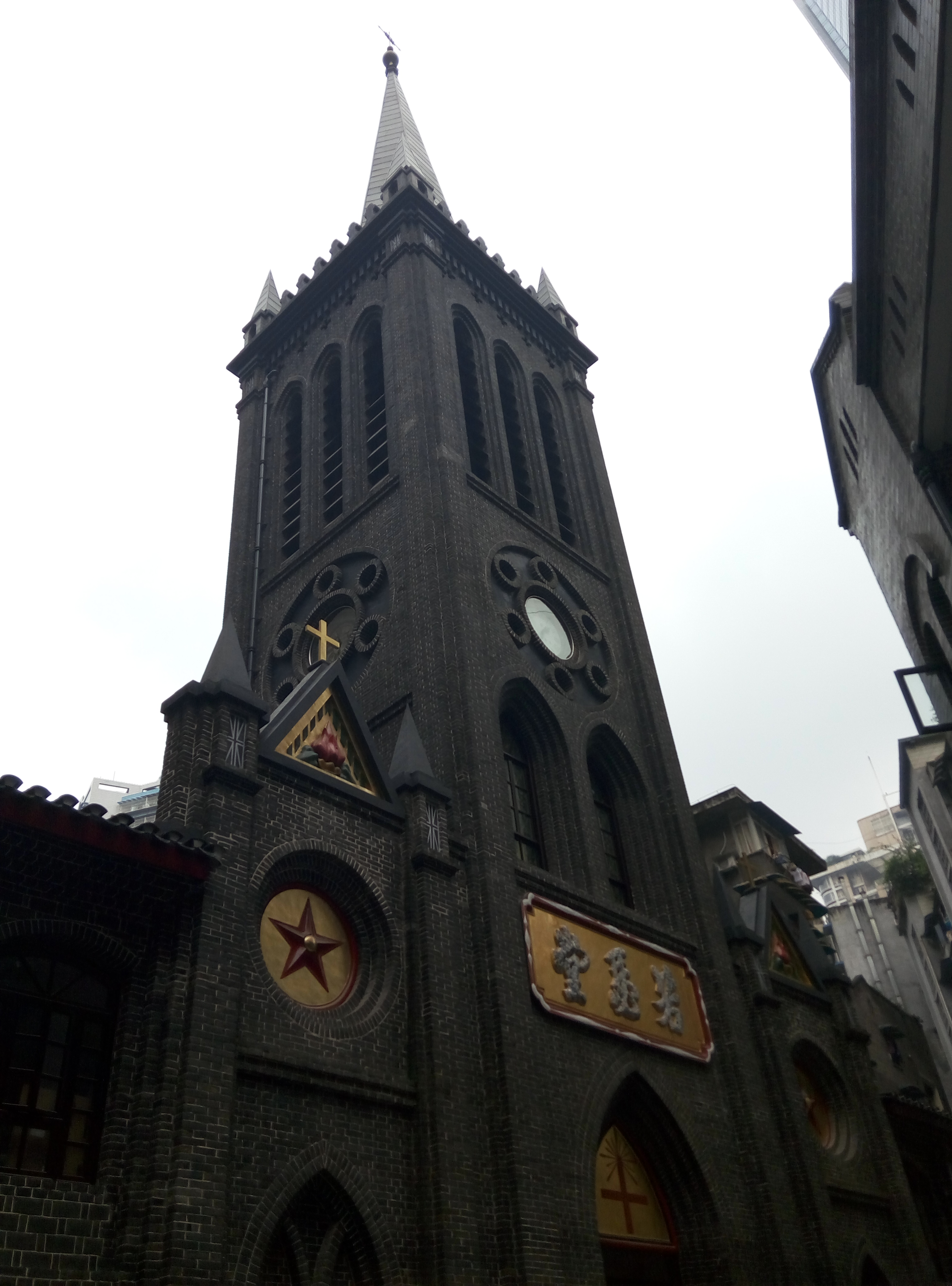
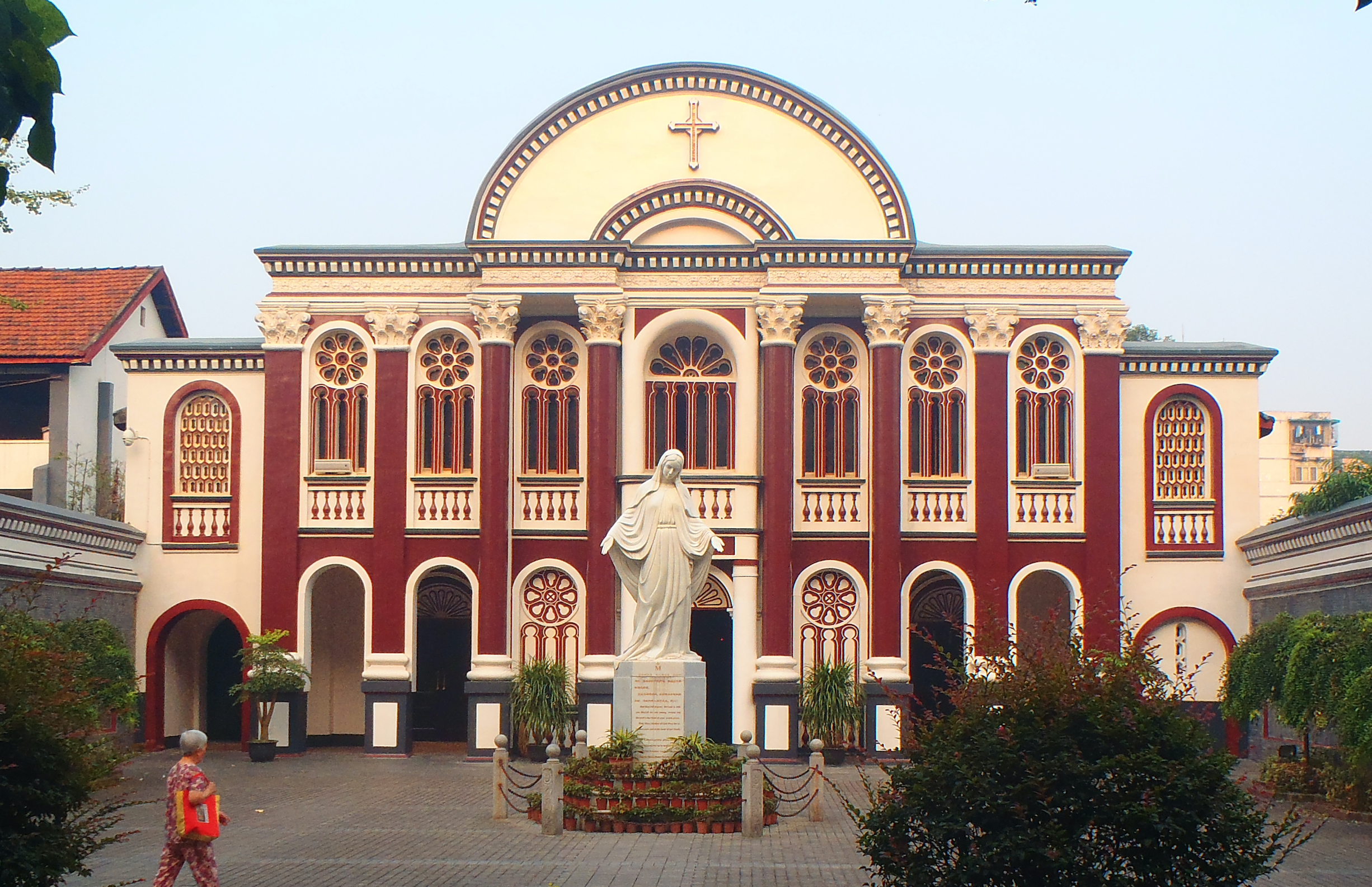
- Clockwise from upper left: coat of arms of the Diocese of Chengdu; St. Joseph's Cathedral, Chongqing; Immaculate Conception Cathedral, Chengdu
- Classification: Catholic
- Orientation: Latin
- Scripture: Catholic Bible
- Theology: Catholic theology
- Polity: Episcopal
- Governance: CPC and BCCCC (controversial)
- Pope: Leo XIV
- Archbishop of Chongqing: Sede vacante
- Region: Sichuan, Chongqing, as well as Tibet Autonomous Region and part of northwestern Yunnan under the jurisdiction of the Diocese of Kangding (Note: According to Christianity in Contemporary China edited by Francis Khek Gee Lim: "The Alulhaka chapel was part of a network of fourteen chapels located in the remote hills around Gongshan county town, where the main Catholic church of the county was located. This network of chapels and churches, together with those in the neighbouring counties in northern Yunnan, are in turn part of the Dali diocese. At least this is how the official China Catholic Patriotic Church currently draws the boundary of the diocese. From the Vatican's perspective, the churches in Gongshan, Deqin and neighbouring counties in Yunnan, Yanjing in Tibet, and Bathang, Lithang, and Kangding in Sichuan, still belong to the Diocese of Kangding that was established in 1946.")
- Language: Sichuanese, Yunnanese, Chinese, Khams Tibetan, Nosu, English, Latin
- Liturgy: Roman Rite
- Headquarters: Chengdu, Sichuan
- Founder: Jesuit origin: Lodovico Buglio; Gabriel de Magalhães; Liu Yuliang; French origin (MEP): Artus de Lionne; François Pottier; Other minor missions: Spanish Redemptorist missions; Order of Saint Benedict; Order of Reformed Cistercians; Order of Friars Minor; Franciscan Missionaries of Mary; Congregation of the Mission; Congregation of the Passion
- Origin: 1640 (386 years ago); Chengdu, Sichuan, Ming empire
- Branched from: Jesuit China missions; Catholic Church in France
- Members: Sichuan: 1,036,538; Chongqing: 478,191; Total: 1,514,729 (2020)
- Places of worship: 826 (1922); 124 (2020)
- Hospitals: 5 (1922)
- Seminaries: 10 (before 1950); 1 (established in 1984 by Patriotic Church)
- Publications: La Vérité (before 1950)

The presence of the Catholic Church in the southwestern Chinese province of Sichuan (Note: Formerly romanized as Szechwan or Szechuan in English; and Sutchuen, Setchuen, Setchoan or Sétchouan in French.) and city of Chongqing (Note: Chongqing, formerly romanized as Chungking in English, and Tchongkin in French, had been part of Sichuan until 1997.) dates back to 1640, when two missionaries, Lodovico Buglio and Gabriel de Magalhães, through Jesuit missions in China, entered the province and spent much of the 1640s evangelizing in Chengdu and its surrounding areas. The Paris Foreign Missions Society assumed full responsibility for the Sichuan Mission in the 18th century.

The Basset–Su Chinese New Testament produced in Chengdu by the French missionary Jean Basset and the Sichuanese convert Johan Su during the first decade of the 18th century, became the prototype for Protestant Bible translations done by Robert Morrison, the first Protestant missionary to China in the early 19th century, which paved the way for the entire Protestant missionary enterprise in the country.

In 1724, Yongzheng Emperor's "Amplified instructions on the Sacred Edict" proscribed Christianity in the Manchu-led Qing empire and declared European missionaries personae non gratae. Catholics in Sichuan found a way to muddle through without ordained priests. When the imperial authorities became increasingly paranoid and were convinced that Catholics were members of a "heretical" organization—as contrasted with state-supported Confucianism—which might threaten the empire's order and rule, district magistrates found it convenient to manipulate non-Catholic communities against the Catholics, leading to discrimination as well as social and political pressure against Catholic families. In consequence of this persecution, a considerable number of Catholics withdrew into the remote mountains and hinterlands of western Sichuan, becoming "hidden Christians" whom were mistaken for Buddhists by European missionaries after the legalization of Christian missions in 1858.

Nevertheless, by 1870, the Catholic Church in Sichuan had 80,000 baptized members, which was the largest number of Catholics in the entire country. By 1911, the number increased to 118,724 members. Throughout its ecclesiastical history, Sichuan was one of the hotbeds of anti-missionary riots in China.

Following the fall of mainland China to communism in late 1949, and the subsequent establishment of the state-sanctioned Catholic Patriotic Church (CPC), the Church in Sichuan, as well as in other provinces, has been subjected to the control of the CPC since 1957, which generated controversy between the Holy See and the People's Republic of China, and created a schism between CPC Catholics and those who remain loyal to Rome. The latter are commonly referred to as loyal church or "underground church" Catholics.

According to 2011 data, Catholics in the dioceses of Chengdu, Shunqing, Jiading, Suifu, Ningyuan numbered 110,000, 80,000, 60,000, 30,000 and 30,000 people, respectively, making a total of 310,000 faithful. This data did not include Catholics in Chongqing (dioceses of Chongqing and Wanxian) and Tibet (Diocese of Kangding), due to the separation of Chongqing from Sichuan in 1997 and the diocesan jurisdiction changes took place in the 1980s and the 1990s.

Despite the Diocese of Chengdu being the oldest bishopric in Sichuan, the primate of the province is the Archbishop of Chongqing, with his seat at St. Joseph's Cathedral. The post has been vacant since the last Archbishop Peter Luo Beizhan died in 2001.

While works on the Catholic missions in the imperial Chinese capitals are abundant (e.g., Chang'an, Khanbaliq/Karakorum, Nanjing, Beijing), Catholicism in Sichuan has seldom been the focus of study.

== History ==
=== Early period ===
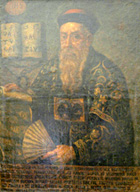
Lodovico Buglio, first Catholic missionary in Sichuan

In 1640, Lodovico Buglio, a Sicilian Jesuit, arrived in Chengdu (Chengtu), the provincial capital, at the invitation of Liu Yuliang, a Sichuanese native from Mianzhu and Grand Secretary of the Ming dynasty. Thirty people were baptized the following year, who were the first Sichuanese Catholics. There was a certain Peter (Petrus) among them, according to An Account of the Entry of the Catholic Religion into Sichuan (1918), he was a descendant of the Prince Xian of Shu, and quite active in the congregation. After the Portuguese Jesuit Gabriel de Magalhães joined the mission in August 1642, work began at once in Chengdu, Baoning and Chongqing.

In 1644, following Zhang Xianzhong's invasion of Sichuan and the subsequent establishment of the "Great West" regime, the mission was cut short and the two priests were held captive in Zhang Xianzhong's court until early 1647. In 1651, Magalhães submitted to Rome a report of their ordeal in Portuguese titled Relação da perda e destituição da Provincia e Christiandade de Su Chuen e do que os pes. Luis Buglio e Gabriel de Magalhães passarão em seu cativ. The report was kept in the Archivum Romanum Societatis Iesu and was never published.

After the devastation of Sichuan (1645–1646) wrought by Zhang Xianzhong's massacre, a search for surviving converts was carried out during the 1660s by Basil Xu, then the intendant of Eastern Sichuan Circuit, and his mother Candida Xu, both Catholics. They found a considerable number of converts in Baoning. Candida then invited the French Jesuit priest Claude Motel (a.k.a. Claude Métel or Claudius Motel, 1618–1671) to serve the congregation. Several churches were built in Chengdu, Baoning and Chongqing under Motel's supervision, and he baptized 600 people in one year.

=== 18th century ===
==== First half of the 18th century ====
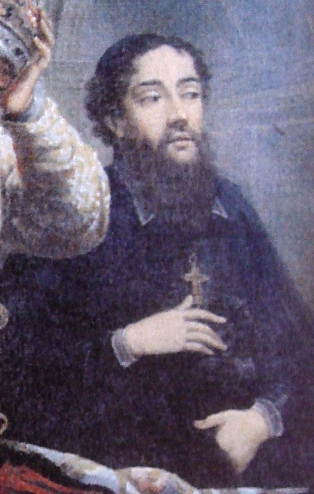
Artus de Lionne, first Apostolic Vicar of Szechwan

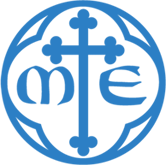
Seal of the Paris Foreign Missions Society (MEP). The MEP became the leading mission society for evangelization of Sichuan since the 18th century.

The Apostolic Vicariate of Szechwan was established on 15 October 1696, with its headquarters in Chengdu. The French missionary Artus de Lionne of the Paris Foreign Missions Society (Missions étrangères de Paris, abbreviated MEP) was appointed as the first apostolic vicar. De Lionne managed to recruit four priests for his vicariate. In 1700, he entrusted the city of Chengdu and the western part of Sichuan to the MEP priests Jean Basset and Jean-François Martin de La Baluère. Two Lazarists were also placed at his disposal, Luigi Antonio Appiani, an Italian, and Johannes Müllener, a German. De Lionne entrusted them with Chongqing and the eastern part of Sichuan. Two different missionary congregations thus found themselves assuming responsibilities in the same province. Though very few in number and facing considerable hardship, the priests of these two societies competed for territory.

The Lyonese priest Jean Basset wrote a long memoir in 1702 in Chengdu, under the title of Avis sur la Mission de Chine, lamenting the sad state of the Church in Sichuan after so many past efforts. For Basset, there was only one remedy: translating the Bible and authorizing a liturgy in Chinese. "It was", he pointed out, "the practice of the apostles and it is the only way to familiarize the Chinese people with the Christian message". Basset set to work on the translation with the assistance of a local convert, Johan Su. Together they produced a New Testament translation in six large volumes which is now known as the Basset–Su Chinese New Testament.

In 1723, the arrival of the Lo family in Jiangjin made the town an important Catholic center in eastern Sichuan. The family was of Cantonese ancestry, whose members converted to Catholicism in 1695, and migrated to Sichuan shortly after their conversion. The Los built a church and a clergy house with donations from the local faithful. During a period of ten years from 1736 to 1746, Giovanni Battista Kou (a.k.a. Joannes-Baptista Kou; 1701–1763) had resided in the clergy house while doing missionary work. Kou was a Beijingese priest trained at the Collegio dei Cinesi in Naples. The faithful from surrounding cities used to gather at the Jiangjin church to sing the Mass and receive the sacraments administered by Father Kou. Musical instruments such as sheng and xiao were used during major Catholic feasts.

During this period, an emerging phenomenon of consecrated virgins came into existence in Sichuan. One of the earliest such virgins was Agnes Yang, a woman from Mingshan County in western Sichuan. Her baptism was confirmed by an MEP priest, Joachim-Enjobert de Martiliat, the fourth Apostolic Vicar of Szechwan and author of the first detailed Rules for Consecrated Virgins (1744). De Martiliat visited Agnes again in 1733 when she was over fifty years old and found that she had remained faithful and chaste. These unmarried Catholic women served as baptizers and female catechists for the evangelization among women. The role they played was important in the growth of the Church in Sichuan, because of the segregation of the sexes in China. The most committed promoter of this practice was Jean-Martin Moye, provicar in Eastern Szechwan (future Archdiocese of Chongqing) and Kweichow (future Archdiocese of Guiyang) since 1773, who founded the Congregation of the Sisters of Providence in Lorraine before entering the mission field of Sichuan.

==== Latter half of the 18th century ====
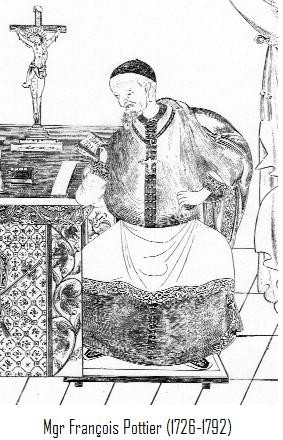
After a portrait of François Pottier painted in 1787 at Chengdu

In 1753, the MEP took over responsibility for Catholic mission in Sichuan. In 1756, François Pottier, a young priest ordained in Tours just three years ago, arrived in Sichuan, taking charge as provicar of the five or six thousand Catholics dispersed in the province. After three years of pastoral visits, he was arrested and tortured, spent a few months in prison in Chongqing. In 1767 he was appointed Titular Bishop of Agathopolis and Apostolic Vicar of Szechwan. His episcopal consecration on 10 September 1769 took place in Xi'an, the capital of Shaanxi province, where he had to flee during a persecution. Having sold his house in Chengdu in 1764, Pottier retired with seven students to a cottage in Fenghuangshan (lit. 'Phoenix Mountain'), 7 kilometers west of Chengdu. His poor school reminded him of the stable in Bethlehem, he called it the "Nativity Seminary". In 1770, his school was denounced to the authorities, and the cottage was destroyed. A few years later, Bishop Pottier resumed the work of training future priests by founding in 1780 a seminary at Long-ki in the Sichuan-Yunnan border region. From 1780 to 1814, forty priests left this seminary and moved to Lo-lang-keou in southern Sichuan shortly after its opening.

In 1783, Pottier chose Jean-Didier de Saint-Martin as coadjutor and ordained him bishop at Chengdu on 13 June 1784. Saint-Martin was imprisoned and then expelled from China the following year, but he managed to return to his post in 1792, the year of Pottier's death. He ensured his own succession by taking Gabriel-Taurin Dufresse as coadjutor, whom he ordained Bishop of Tabraca in 1800. This new bishop already had twenty years of experience in Sichuan, where he arrived in 1776. His ministry was interrupted by the persecution of 1784. Dufresse was imprisoned, brought to Beijing and then exiled to Portuguese Macau and the Spanish Philippines, he secretly returned to Chengdu in 1789 and was put in charge of the Eastern Szechwan and Kweichow missions. On the death of Saint-Martin in 1801, he took charge of the entire province. Despite the insecurity and multiple setbacks, the Church in Sichuan was then relatively prosperous. In 1756 there were 4,000 Catholics and two local priests in the province. In 1802, the number increased tenfold with 40,000 Catholics and 16 local priests. The pastoral experience accumulated during the 18th century made it possible to establish a general directory of the conditions of Christian life and the ministry of the sacraments.

==== Persecution ====
The Christians in the 18th century suffered from persecution on both the local and national levels. Since the beginning of the Chinese Rites controversy—a dispute among Catholic missionaries over the religiosity of Confucianism—in the 17th century, in the position of foreign missionaries in China became very difficult. In 1724, the Yongzheng Emperor prohibited the propagation of Christianity through his "Amplified instructions on the Sacred Edict", which was issued by his predecessor to instruct the average subjects in the empire in the basic principles of Confucian orthodoxy.

In addition to imperial persecutions, Catholics in Sichuan had to face formidable local opposition. The officials and average dwellers of Sichuan had little toleration for this "Western" religion, who constantly gave the Catholics a hard time. Catholics were regarded as non-comformists going against long-established traditions such as the segregation of the sexes according to Confucian teachings, for Catholic men and women prayed together in churches, despite Confucianism had relatively little influence in this province. Local authorities actively sought opportunities to humiliate them in order to better their position in the eyes of common people. Catholics were also accused of being members of a secret political society that might threaten the imperial rule. District magistrates found it convenient to manipulate non-Catholic communities against the Catholics, leading to injustices against the latter in the courts. Catholics often lost their cases, their properties were consequently confiscated, their churches destroyed. Some well-to-do families were thus reduced to poverty and had to beg for food in the streets.

In consequence of the persecution, a considerable number of Catholics withdrew into the remote mountains and hinterlands of western Sichuan, becoming "hidden Christians" in order to avoid official attention. This situation lasted until the legalization of Christian missions in 1858 by the Treaty of Tientsin.

During the persecution in the first half of the 18th century, when all European missionaries were forced to leave Sichuan, André Ly was left as the senior Catholic priest in the province. Ly was a native of Hanzhong, a city located in southwestern Shaanxi but culturally Ba–Shu (i.e. Sichuanese). He studied at St. Joseph's Seminary in Ayuthia and was well versed in Latin. He kept a diary in Latin every day from 1746 to 1763, in which he recorded persecutions and his pastoral activities. In 1906, his diary was published in Paris under the title of Journal d'André Ly, or Diarium Andreæ Ly in Latin.

=== 19th century ===
==== First half of the 19th century ====
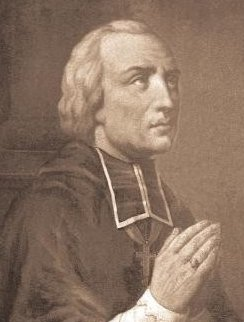
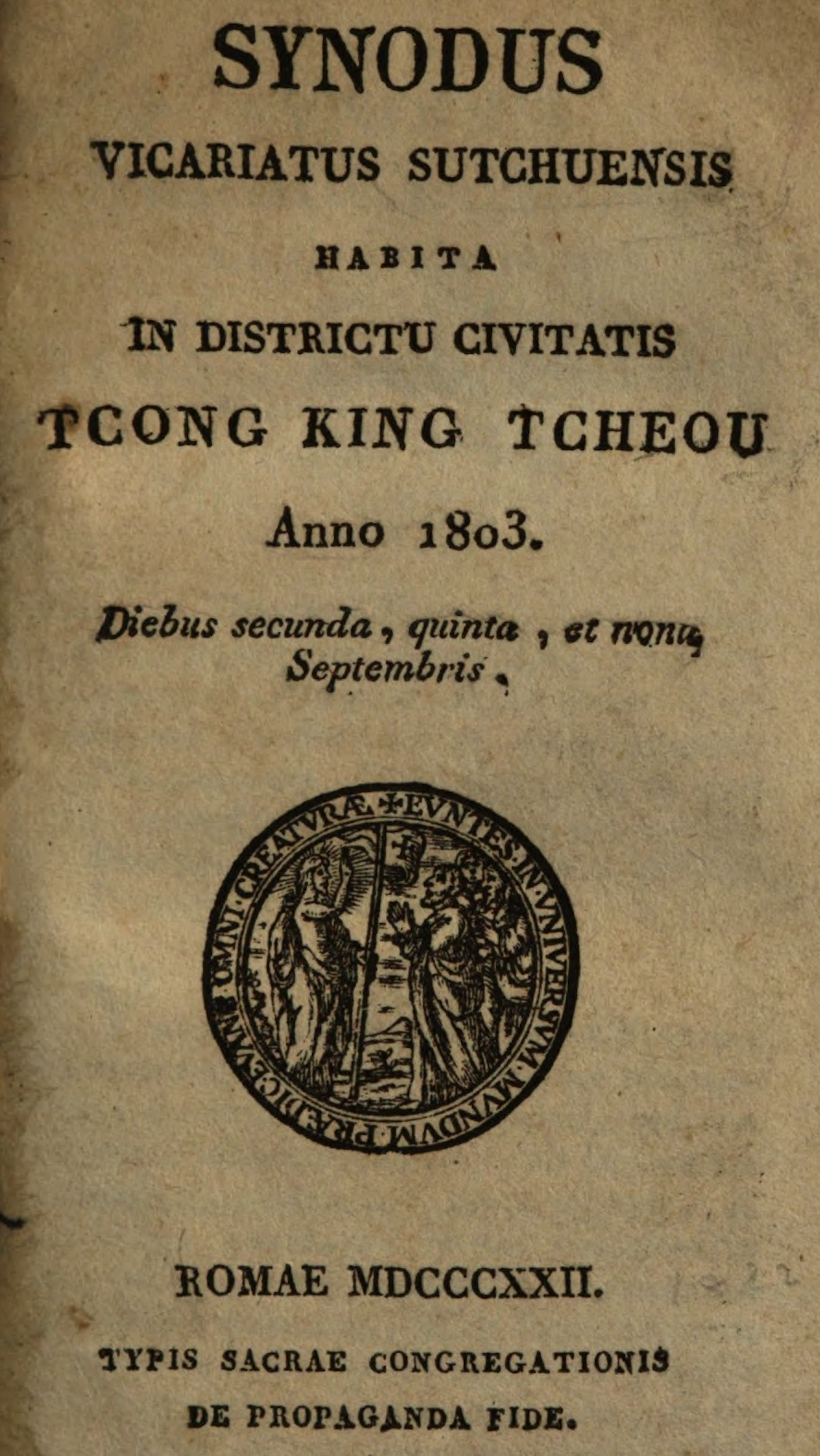
Bishop Gabriel-Taurin Dufresse, future martyr saint, presented Synodus Vicariatus Sutchuensis to Rome, fruit of the First Synod of Sichuan, which was the first Catholic synod held in China.

On 2 September 1803, Bishop Gabriel-Taurin Dufresse convened the first synod in China near Chongqingzhou (Tchong-king-tcheou, 'Chongqing Prefecture'), 40 kilometers west of Chengdu. Thirteen Chinese priests and two French priests participated, namely Dufresse and Jean-Louis Florens. The decisions published in Synodus Vicariatus Sutchuensis refer primarily to the pastoral care of the sacraments. Chapter 10 deals with the ministry of the priests, recommending fervor in the spiritual life and discretion in temporal things. The provisions of the First Synod of Sichuan were to guide the apostolate in this province and in many other regions of China until the Plenary Council of Shanghai in 1924.

In 1805, the Jiaqing Emperor launched an even harsher persecution which lasted for many years. In Sichuan, the first victim was Augustine Tchao, a priest from Wuchuan, Guizhou province, who died after torture in a prison in Chengdu on 27 January 1815. Bishop Dufresse was also a victim during this persecution. He was betrayed to the imperial authorities by a scared new convert under torture, and was arrested on 18 May 1815. He was taken to Xinjin, then to Chengdu, where he was beheaded on 14 September of the same year in the North Gate Square. His head was tied to a post and his body was exposed for three days as a warning to others. He was canonized a saint by Pope John Paul II on 1 October 2000.

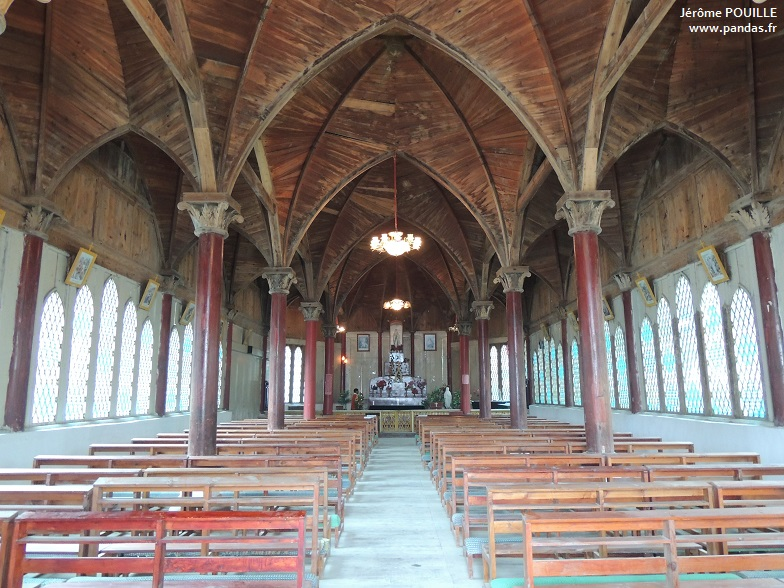
Interior of Annunciation Church, Dengchigou, former Seminary of Muping

In 1830, the MEP, as a society of apostolic life which had the objective of evangelizing non-Christian Asian countries, secretly opened a college at Muping (in French, Moupin), on Sichuan-Tibetan border, known as Muping Seminary or Collège de l'Annonciation (presently the Annunciation Church at Dengchigou) to recruit local clergy. Laurent-Joseph-Marius Imbert, founder of the seminary, became the first superior. He lived there for twelve years before leaving for Korea. In one of his letters, he wrote, "the Szechwan Mission is well enough furnished to be able to do without a missionary." In 1858, the Treaty of Tientsin effectively legalized Christian missions in China, a century ban on Catholicism came to an end. Newly arrived missionaries in western Sichuan mistook those "hidden Christians" for Buddhists.

==== Latter half of the 19th century ====
After 1858, many of the missionaries stationed at the Collège de l'Annonciation de Moupin were well educated in the natural sciences (botany, zoology, geology) and sought to come into contact with scientific establishments of Paris. Today the Annunciation Church is well-remembered thanks to Armand David, a Lazarist missionary as well as a zoologist and a botanist, who in 1869 arrived at Muping in a sedan chair. There, he discovered the giant panda, which was hitherto known only to the Chinese. About fifty local students studied at the Muping Seminary under the direction of Anatole Dugrité, superior of the Collège de l'Annonciation. At that time, the college and mission station belonged to the Apostolic Vicariate of Western Szechwan whose bishop was Annet-Théophile Pinchon.

On 20 September 1880, the Second Synod of Sichuan was convened by Bishop Jules Lepley and held in Suifu, seat of the Apostolic Vicariate of Southern Szechwan. Participants included the apostolic vicars and provicars of Eastern Szechwan, Northwestern Szechwan, Southern Szechwan, Tibet, Kweichow and Yunnan.

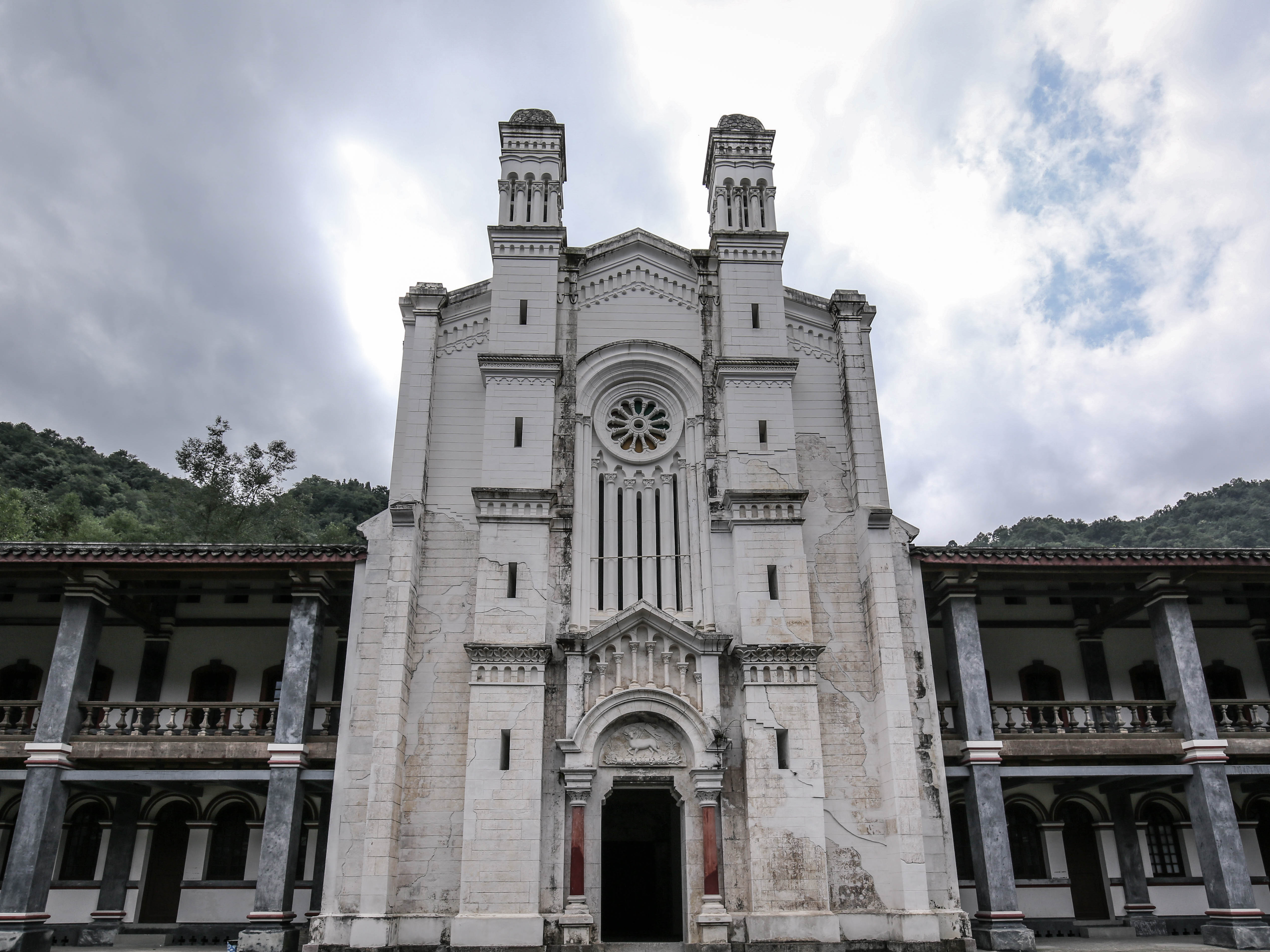
The abandoned Annunciation Seminary

At Bailu, Pengzhou, construction of the Annunciation Seminary was started in 1895 by Bishop Marie-Julien Dunand, successor to Bishop Pinchon who died in 1891. The seminary was designed by two French missionaries, Alexandre Perrodin and Léon Rousseau. After 13 years, it was completed in 1908 and became an important institute for the training of priests in the province at that time.

That same year (1895) was marked by a serious outbreak of anti-foreign agitation began in the capital Chengdu, and thence spread throughout the province. In the capital, the property of the Catholic mission and that of three Protestant missions was destroyed; and all missionaries of all missions, Catholic and Protestant alike, were thankful to escape with their lives.

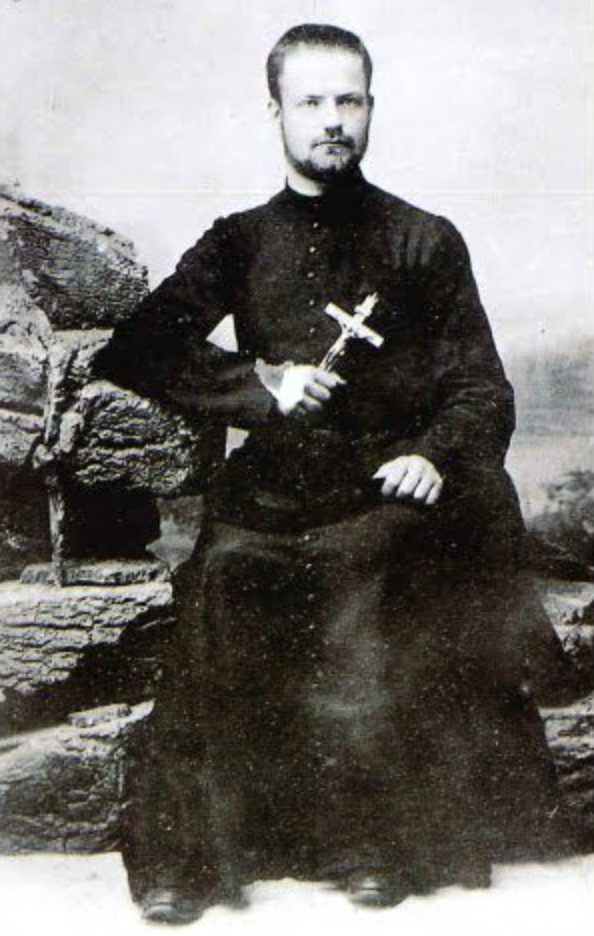
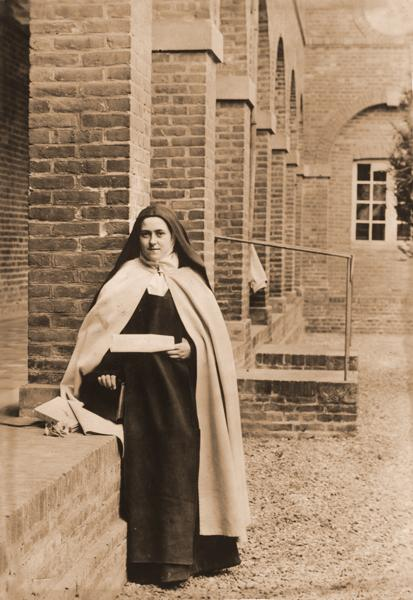
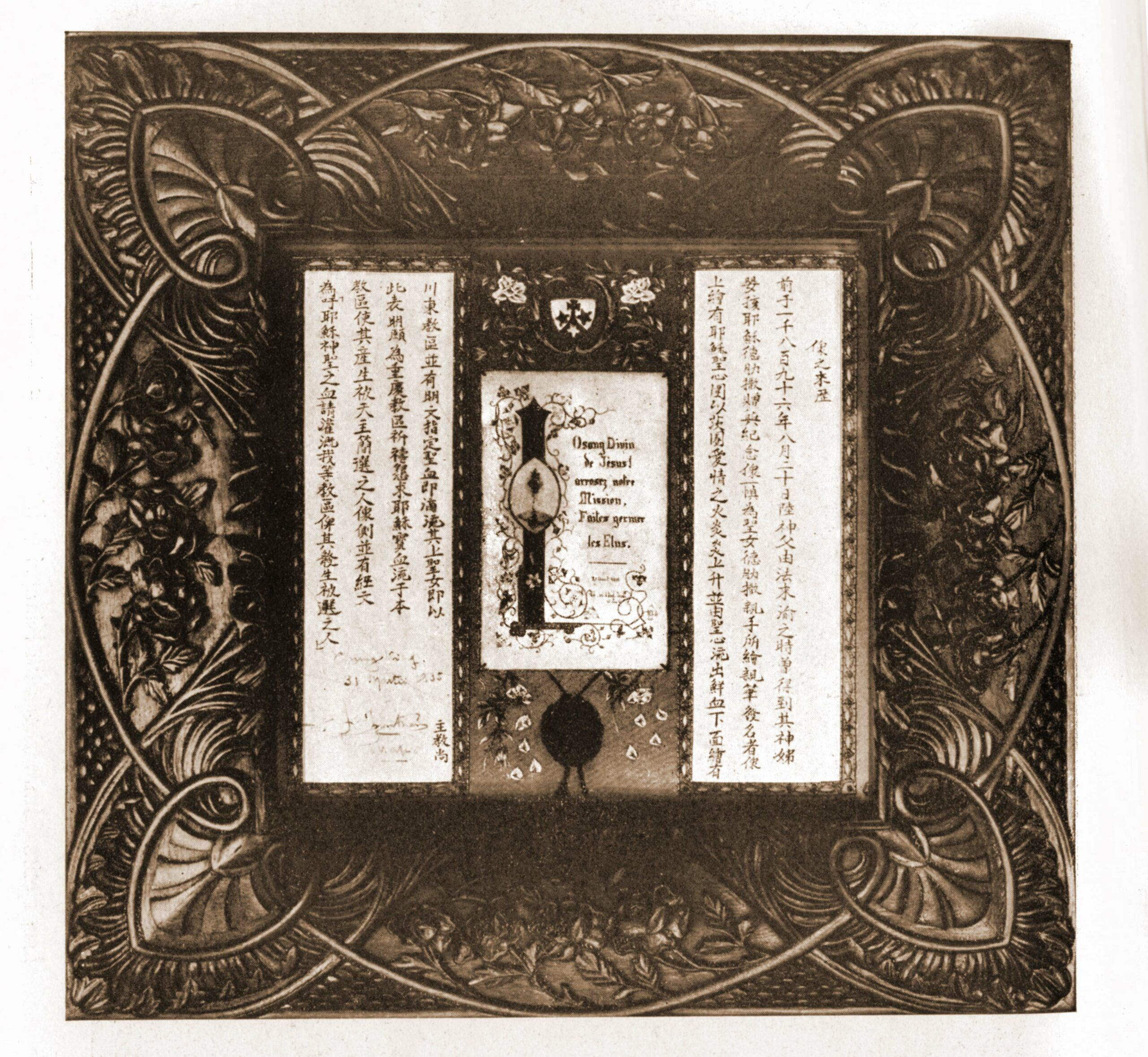
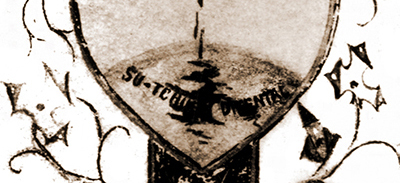
Above: Adolphe Roulland, a spiritual brother of Saint Thérèse of Lisieux; Thérèse of Lisieux holding in her right hand La Mission du Su-Tchuen au XVIII^{me} siècle. Below: Saint Thérèse's Sacred Heart picture for Father Adolphe Roulland. Beneath the Divine Blood flowing on the earth, she inscribed Su-Tchuen oriental, as can be discerned in the enlarged detail on the right.

On 29 July 1896, a newly ordained priest Adolphe Roulland, was sent to the Apostolic Vicariate of Eastern Szechwan by Paris Foreign Missions Society. The next year, he was appointed vicar at Youyang (Yeou-yang), in the city of Chongqing. Five years later (1902), he was appointed parish priest of Mapaochang (Ma-pao-tchang; now merged with Shima Town) in the same city, where he stayed for seven years. Roulland was a spiritual brother of Saint Thérèse of Lisieux, a French Discalced Carmelite who is widely venerated in modern times. The term "spiritual brotherhood" or "sisterhood" denotes a reciprocal commitment of two apostles (i.e. missionaries) in the service of the salvation of souls. A Carmelite would support the missionary work through prayer and sacrifice. By way of return, a missionary would nurture the spiritual fervor of a Carmelite through mission experience.

Roulland gifted the Carmelite Convent of Lisieux the book by Léonide Guiot, La Mission du Su-Tchuen au XVIII^{me} siècle : Vie et Apostolat de Mgr Pottier, son fondateur ('The Su-Tchuen Mission in the 18th Century: Life and Apostolate of Bishop Pottier, Its Founder', 1892), which had a great influence on Thérèse. By way of return, Thérèse gave Roulland a Sacred Heart picture accompanied by a prayer: "O Divine Blood of Jesus! Water our mission, sprout the elect." Surrounded by floral marginalia, the heart with a small cross is depicted dripping a drop of blood on Su-Tchuen oriental, denoting the spilled Divine Blood on the Mission of Chongqing. Su-Tchuen oriental also appears in her poem "To Our Lady of Victories, Queen of Virgins, Apostles and Martyrs" composed on 16 July 1896.

In her letter to Roulland dated 30 July 1896, Thérèse expressed her hope for a visit to Sichuan: "I have attached the map of Su-Tchuen on the wall where I work, [...] I will ask Jesus' permission to go to visit you at Su-Tchuen, and we shall continue our apostolate together." Today, in addition to keeping one of Thérèse's letters to Fr. Roulland, the Church of Janua Coeli at Shima (Ma Pao Tchang Church) also preserves one of her relics.

=== 1900–1949 ===
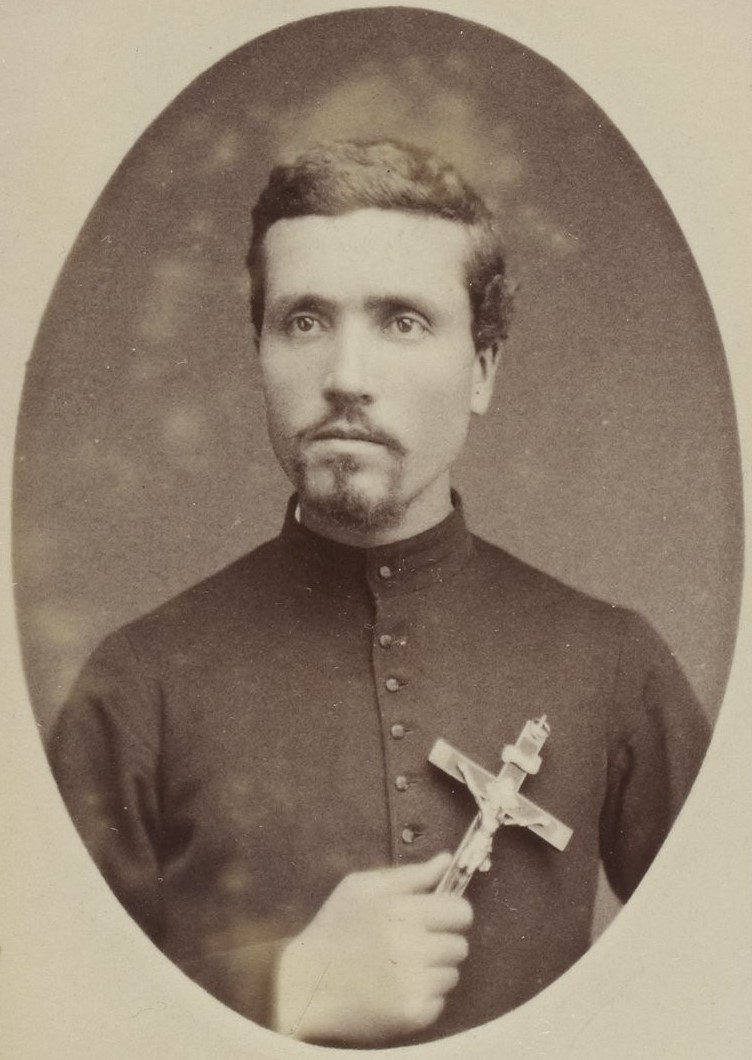
Jean-André Soulié

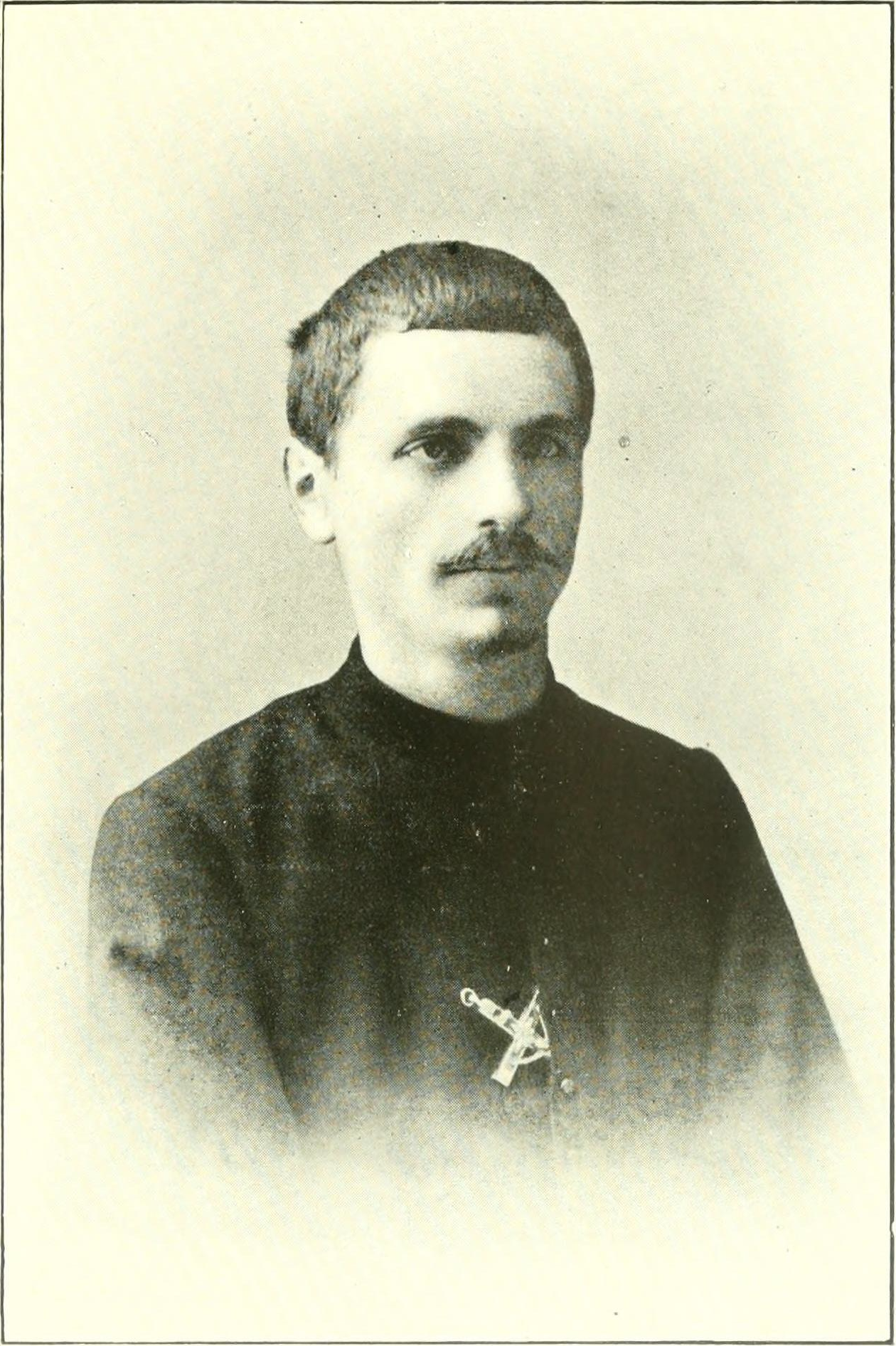
Jean-Théodore Monbeig

Missionaries in the Sichuan-Tibetan borderland

In 1905, four French missionaries were killed in the Bathang uprising, including Jean-André Soulié, who ministered to the faithful in the Apostolic Vicariate of Tibet. He was captured by lamas. After twelve days of torture, on 14 April, he was shot in the Ngarongchy valley, not far from Yaregong. Nine years later (1914), Jean-Théodore Monbeig, another French missionary working in the Sichuan-Tibetan border region, was killed by lamas near Lithang, not long after helping revive the Christian community at Bathang.

In 1918, French missionary François-Marie-Joseph Gourdon edited and published in Chongqing An Account of the Entry of the Catholic Religion into Sichuan, by the authority of Célestin Chouvellon, Bishop of Eastern Szechwan. This work is allegedly based on Gabriel de Magalhães's Relação das tyranias obradas por Canghien Chungo famoso ladrão da China em o anno de 1651. In addition, An Account of the Entry of the Catholic Religion into Anyo, detailing the history of the Church in Anyue County (Sichuanese romanization: Anyo), was published in 1924, with the approval of Urbain Claval, Provicar of Eastern Szechwan.

By the end of 1921, there were 143,747 Catholic Christians in Sichuan. These worshipped in 826 chapels and churches scattered throughout the province which was divided into four bishoprics with episcopal residences at Chengdu, Chongqing, Suifu and Ningyuan. Almost 8,000 adults were baptized into the Catholic Church during 1918. In addition to regular evangelistic activities, the Church maintained nearly 400 parish schools of primary grade with over 7,500 students. There were three colleges in the province, two in Chongqing and one in Chengdu; ten seminaries, and five schools for girls. Catholic missions also reported five hospitals and seven dispensaries.

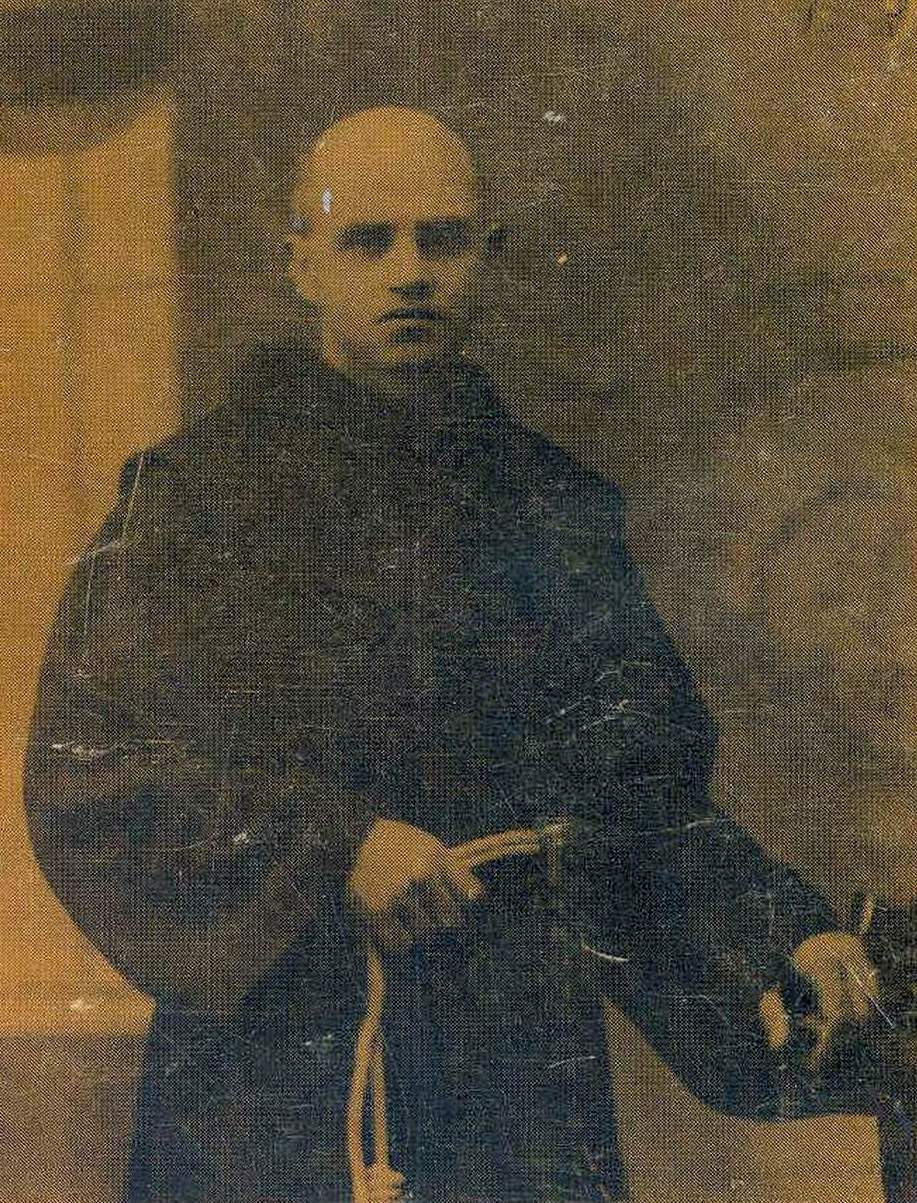
Pascual Nadal Oltra, a Pego-born Franciscan missionary, beheaded in 1935 in Ngawa, one of the three Tibetan regions of western Sichuan

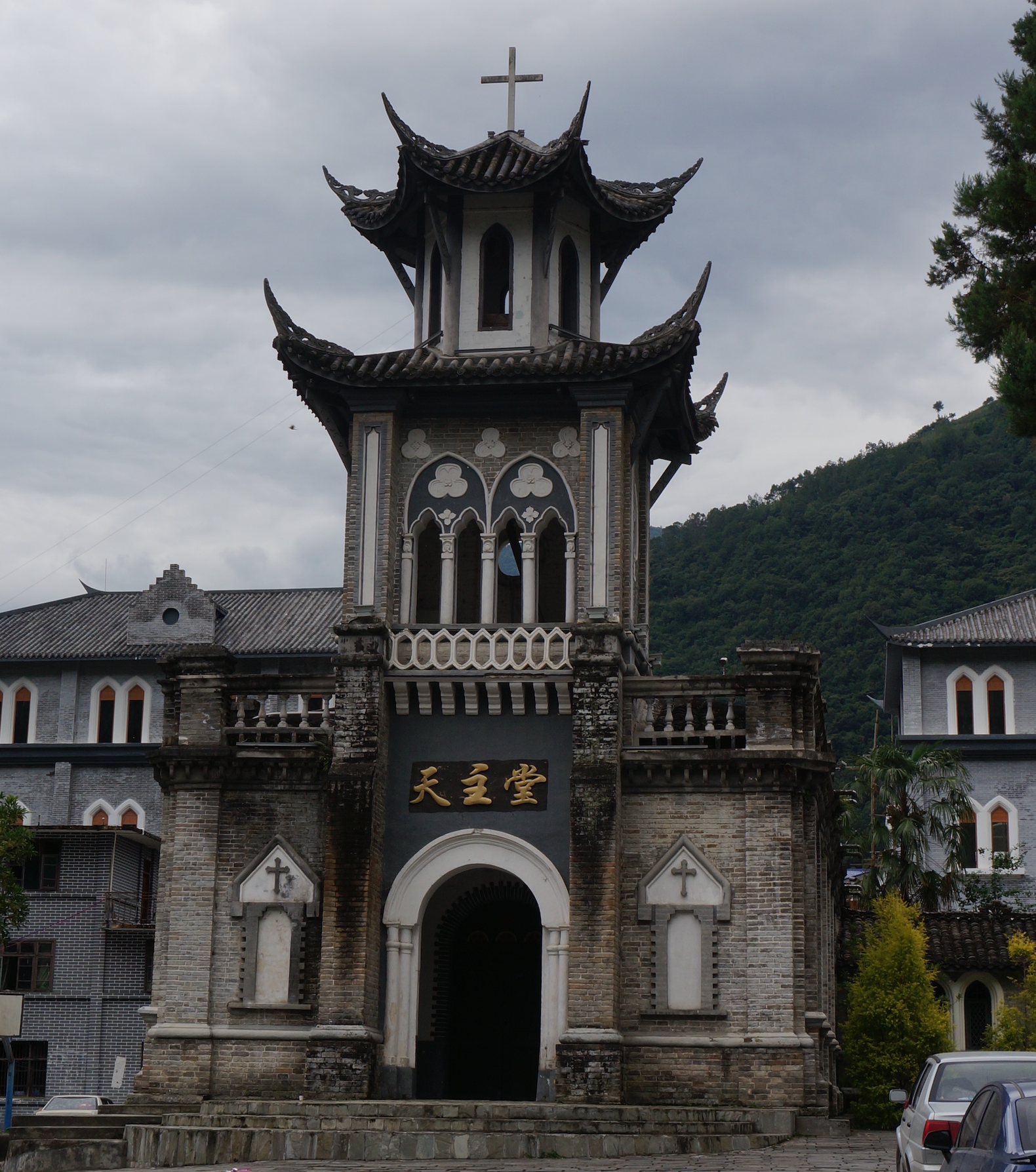
St. Anne's Church, Moxi

In 1930, a Spanish Franciscan friar and artist Pascual Nadal Oltra arrived in Moxi (Mosimien), a small town located in Garzê, one of the three Tibetan regions of western Sichuan. With the support of the Apostolic Vicar of Tatsienlu (Pierre-Philippe Giraudeau) and his coadjutor Pierre Valentin, Oltra, the Father Guardian Plácido Albiero, a Canadian friar Bernabé Lafond and an Italian José Andreatta formed the founding community of a leper colony established near St. Anne's Church, known as St. Joseph's Home. There were dormitories for leper patients, a pharmacy and an infirmary. The installation of the first lepers was not easy, given their ignorance and the situation of marginalization and social aversion in which they lived. Nevertheless, by 1935, the missionaries already had a hundred patients.

In May 1935, a communist army column led by Mao Zedong (Mao Tse Tung) was fleeing Chiang Kai-shek's regular army to northwest China through the Moxi area, part of a military retreat later known as Long March. According to the Valencian Franciscan friar José Miguel Barrachina Lapiedra, author of the book Fray Pascual Nadal y Oltra: Apóstol de los leprosos, mártir de China, and a report published in Malaya Catholic Leader, the official newspaper of the Archdiocese of Singapore: "The communist soldiers entered the leper colony, they looted the residence and arrested the friars and sisters. Many of the lepers tried to defend the missionaries, but they were shot by the soldiers. The Franciscans were then brought before Mao Tse Tung, who interrogated them, imprisoned two of them, Pascual Nadal Oltra and an Italian friar Epifanio Pegoraro, and released the rest. There were more than 30,000 Reds in the band, including a large number of women. Before their departure, the soldiers ransacked the village, carrying away everything movable and edible, left the people of the district without means of subsistence. Days later, on 4 December 1935, the army reached Leang Ho Kow, Tsanlha, where the two Franciscans were beheaded with a sword."

In her letter to the poet Raymond Cortat, dated 17 January 1937, Marie-Rosine Sahler, a member of the Franciscan Missionaries of Mary, recounts in detail her journey, her arrival in China and her life in the Mosimien leper colony, a testimony about the political hardship: "In 1935, the leper colony was savagely attacked by communist army and the mission community had to flee to the mountains and stay there for eight days. Upon her return, she found the leper colony ransacked and all supplies looted. Nevertheless, the community managed to recover and welcome back the sick, who in 1937 were 148 people."

In 1947, Trappist monks from Our Lady of Joy Abbey (Diocese of Zhengding) transferred their monastery to Xindu, Chengdu, due to the ongoing civil war. Father Paulin Li and forty monks reached their destination via Shanghai. They remained in Sichuan for two years, until the end of 1949, when the communist invasion reached there, too. By which time, north and central China were already taken over by communists. It became evident that the monastic community had to move again. On Christmas Day, 1949, communists occupied the Chengdu Monastery and its surrounding land. A couple of the young monks were severely beaten, three were martyred after brutal torture, namely, Vincent Shi, Albert Wei, and Father You. Father Paulin Li managed to transfer ten of the monks to Canada, including nine Chinese nationals and one Belgian. Eventually, the abbey was re-established on Lantau Island, British Hong Kong. A permanent location for Our Lady of Joy Abbey at Hong Kong was secured on 19 February 1956.

==== Spanish Redemptorist missions ====
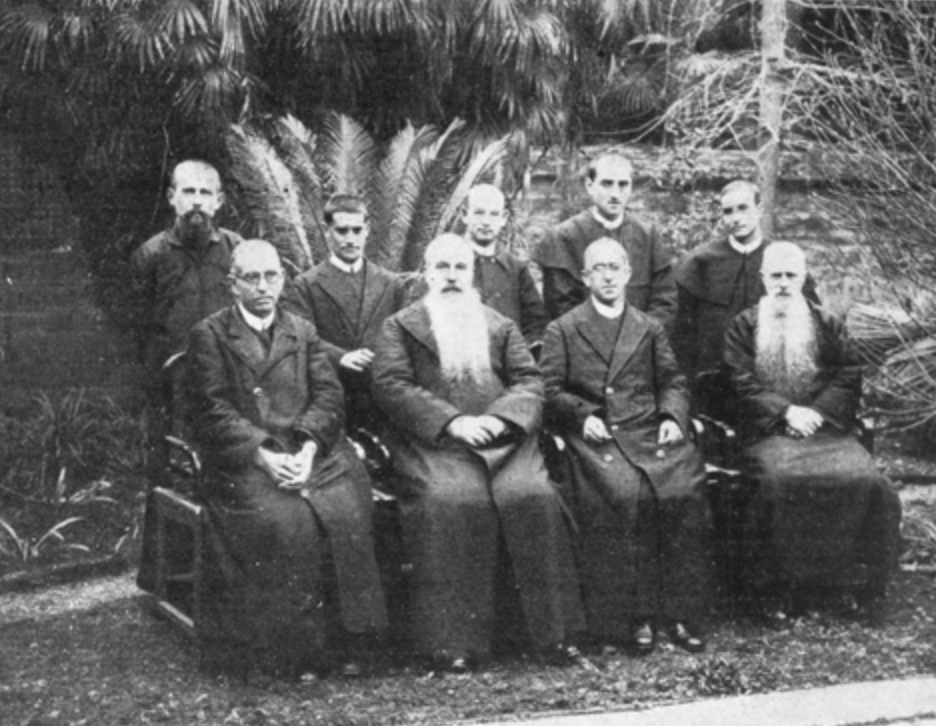
Spanish Redemptorist community in Chengdu, with Jacques-Victor-Marius Rouchouse, then the Apostolic Vicar of Chengtu

The Spanish Redemptorist missions in Sichuan lasted from 1934 until 1952, when the last Spanish Redemptorists were expelled from China by the newly-established communist regime.

In February 1928, Segundo Miguel Rodríguez, José Morán Pan and Segundo Velasco Arina sailed for north China at the request of Celso Benigno Luigi Costantini. Initially, they were put in charge of the seminary of the Congregation of the Disciples of the Lord in the Apostolic Vicariate of Süanhwafu, Hebei province. They then began their own missionary work in Siping, Henan province, until they found a new home in the remote western province of Sichuan.

Their first permanent foundation was made in the provincial capital Chengdu on 24 April 1934, which expanded to include a mission house and a chapel. In addition to the Apostolic Vicariate of Chengtu, the Apostolic Vicariate of Ningyuanfu became their second mission base in 1938. This district covers the entire Nosu Country that is further to the west and bordered by eastern Tibet. The Galician priest Juan Campos Rodríguez spent most of his China years in Sichang (i.e. Ningyuanfu). The two foundations in Sichuan subsequently became the Redemptorist Vice-Province of China with Father José Pedrero as superior.

==== American Passionists in Chongqing ====
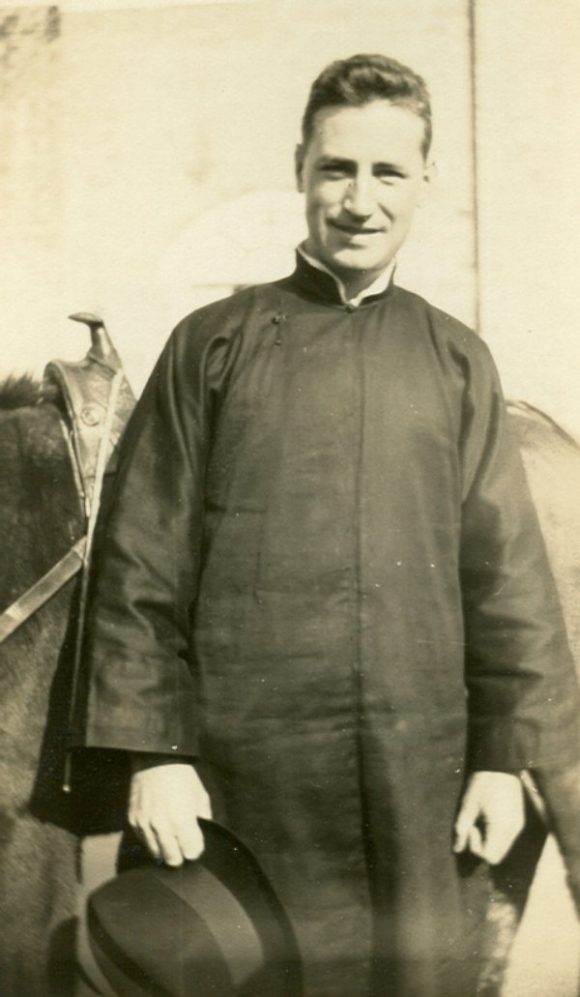
Fr. Cormac Shanahan, Passionist missionary in Chongqing

The Passionists had a small presence in the eastern Sichuanese city of Chongqing since 1927, when they evacuated Hunan province for security reasons. During that journey, Clarissa Stattmiller, one of the Sisters of St. Joseph of Baden, Pennsylvania, (Note: The Sisters of St. Joseph served as assistants to the Passionist missionaries.) died of an illness and was interred in the graveyard of the Franciscan Missionaries of Mary in Chongqing.

Later, during the 1940s, Passionist priests Cormac Shanahan and Caspar Caulfield lived and worked in that city. Father Shanahan started his work in Chongqing in 1941. Part of his ministry there involved writing for The Sign, a Catholic monthly magazine that was published in the United States since 1921. But Shanahan eventually began to write for China Correspondent, a Chongqing-based magazine which existed only from December 1943 to September 1944. The birth of this magazine was the result of a decision made to transform the French Catholic weekly Le Correspondant chinois into an English Catholic monthly. Its readers were American servicemen in China, particularly G.I. Catholic soldiers who were often alone. Later, Father Caulfield arrived in Chongqing to work for the magazine as well.

== 1949–present ==
=== Background ===
After the communist takeover of China in 1949, a combination of assertive nationalism and socialist ideology led to the eradication of the Western presence in the country, including Western culture and products. "The denunciation of anything Western as 'capitalist', 'bourgeois' and representative of the 'imperialist world' reached a peak during the ideological extremism of the Korean War (1950–1953) when the final vestiges of the Western economic and cultural presence were eradicated." Missionary and communist ambitions simply were irreconcilable and the wide ideological gap could not be bridged. The stage had been set for the communists' catastrophic assault on the missionary enterprise during the Civil War period (1946–1949) and the expulsion of virtually all foreigners in the early 1950s. Foreign missionaries who were suspected of being spies were arrested, some were sent to thought reform centers in which they underwent disturbing re-education process in a vindictive prison setting. Missionary institutes funded by foreign money were closed down and all foreign missionaries expelled from the country. Catholicism in China, like all religions in the country, has since been permitted to operate only under the supervision of the State Administration for Religious Affairs. All legal worship has to be conducted in government-approved churches belonging to the Catholic Patriotic Association, which does not accept the primacy of the Roman pontiff.

=== Church in Sichuan and Tibet ===
During the Land Reform Movement in the early 1950s, several Legion of Mary (LOM) organizations in Pengzhou were banned and persecuted, since the communist regime termed the LOM a "counter-revolutionary force".

In 1989, while an administrator of the Diocese of Qinzhou, John Baptist Wang Ruohan was consecrated "underground bishop" of Kangding by Paul Li Zhenrong, Bishop of Xianxian. In 2011, John Baptist was arrested by Chinese security forces, along with his brothers, Bishop Casimir Wang Mi-lu and Father John Wang Ruowang, as well as a group of lay faithful, who do not belong to the government-authorized Catholic Patriotic Association.

In 2005, Chinese government officials planned to consecrate two bishops in the dioceses of Chengdu and Leshan (Jiading) without papal mandate, whose appointments were rejected by the approximately 140,000 faithful in both dioceses, due to their open political maneuvering.

Following the devastation of dozens of churches by the 2008 Sichuan earthquake, British missionary Audrey Donnithorne set up a fund for the reconstruction of churches, schools and nurseries in that province where she had been born in 1922. Audrey was the daughter of Vyvyan Donnithorne, an English evangelical Anglican missionary stationed at the Gospel Church of Hanchow in northern Sichuan during the 1930s. Dissatisfied with the Protestant religious life on the campus of West China Union University in Chengdu, she converted to Catholicism in 1943, and received baptism at Immaculate Conception Cathedral, Chengdu. She was crucial in the reconciliation of a "patriotic" bishop in Sichuan with the Holy See, leading to the establishment of unity between the "underground" and "patriotic" churches in that province. She was expelled from mainland China in 1997 due to her activities for the church.

On 3 September 2011, an attack took place against a nun and a priest in the small Sichuanese Tibetan town of Moxi. After demanding the restitution of two church properties which were seized by communist authorities in the 1950s, Sister Xie Yuming was severely beaten by a group of unknown assailants and had to be hospitalized, while Father Huang Yusong suffered minor injuries. The properties, a Latin school demolished by the authorities, and a boys' school occupied by Moxi government officials at the time, were formerly owned by the Diocese of Kangding. After the attack, many parishioners gathered to protest in front of St. Anne's Church and expressed their disapproval of the methods used by those who sponsored the assailants.

In 2014, while helping with the development of the local Catholic Church of the Mekong and Salween valleys in Yunnanese Tibet, part of the Diocese of Kangding, the French scout Baptiste Langlois-Meurinne met a Vatican priest—that is, not affiliated to the state-sanctioned Chinese Patriotic Church but with the underground church—who organized a clandestine camp for Bareng children where he taught them Tibetan, English and catechism.

On 29 June 2022, Feast of Saints Peter and Paul, a celebration of the anniversary of the founding of the Chinese Communist Party was held at the Cathedral of the Sacred Heart of Jesus in Leshan (Diocese of Jiading), for political reasons. Bishop Paul Lei Shiyin participated in the celebration, who was ordained a priest without a papal mandate in 2011. He was accused of having a mistress and children and was excommunicated, but his excommunication was lifted after an agreement on episcopal appointments signed between the Vatican and China in 2018. During the ceremony, the Catholics were called to "listen to the word of the Party, feel the grace of the Party, and follow the Party". According to a Catholic source contacted by AsiaNews, despite the 2018 agreement, the imposition of state sponsored ideology on the faithful and the persecution of "underground church" members never stop. Reggie Littlejohn, president of Women's Rights Without Frontiers, told Catholic News Agency that "since the deal was reached, things have gone from bad to worse for Catholics in China."

== Dioceses ==
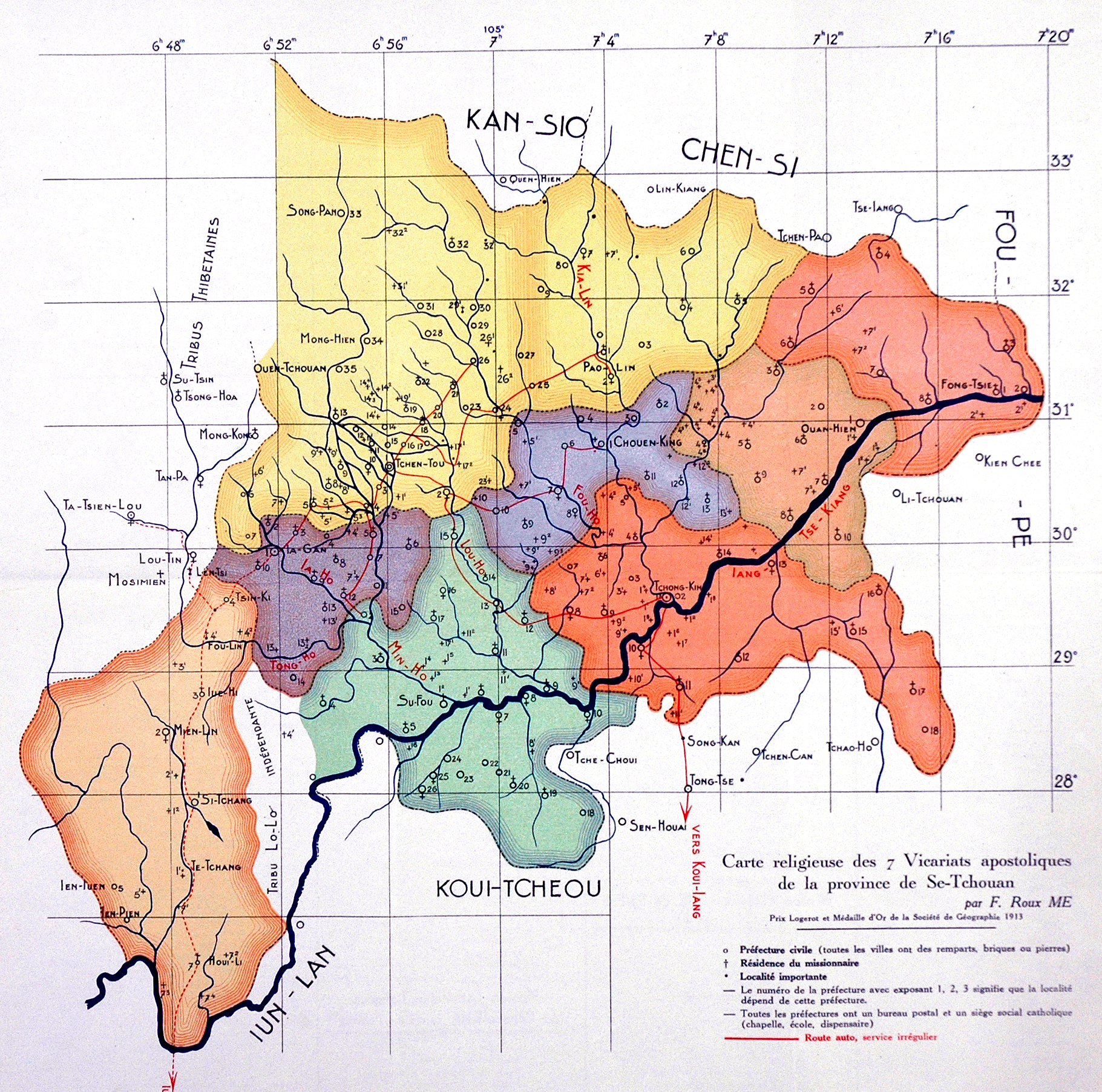
The seven former apostolic vicariates of Szechwan (excluding Ta-tsien-lou which belonged to the Mission of Tibet): Tchen-tou (northwest), Tchong-kin (southeast), Chouen-king (central), Si-tchang (southwest), Su-fou (south), Ia-gan (west), and Ouan-hien (east)

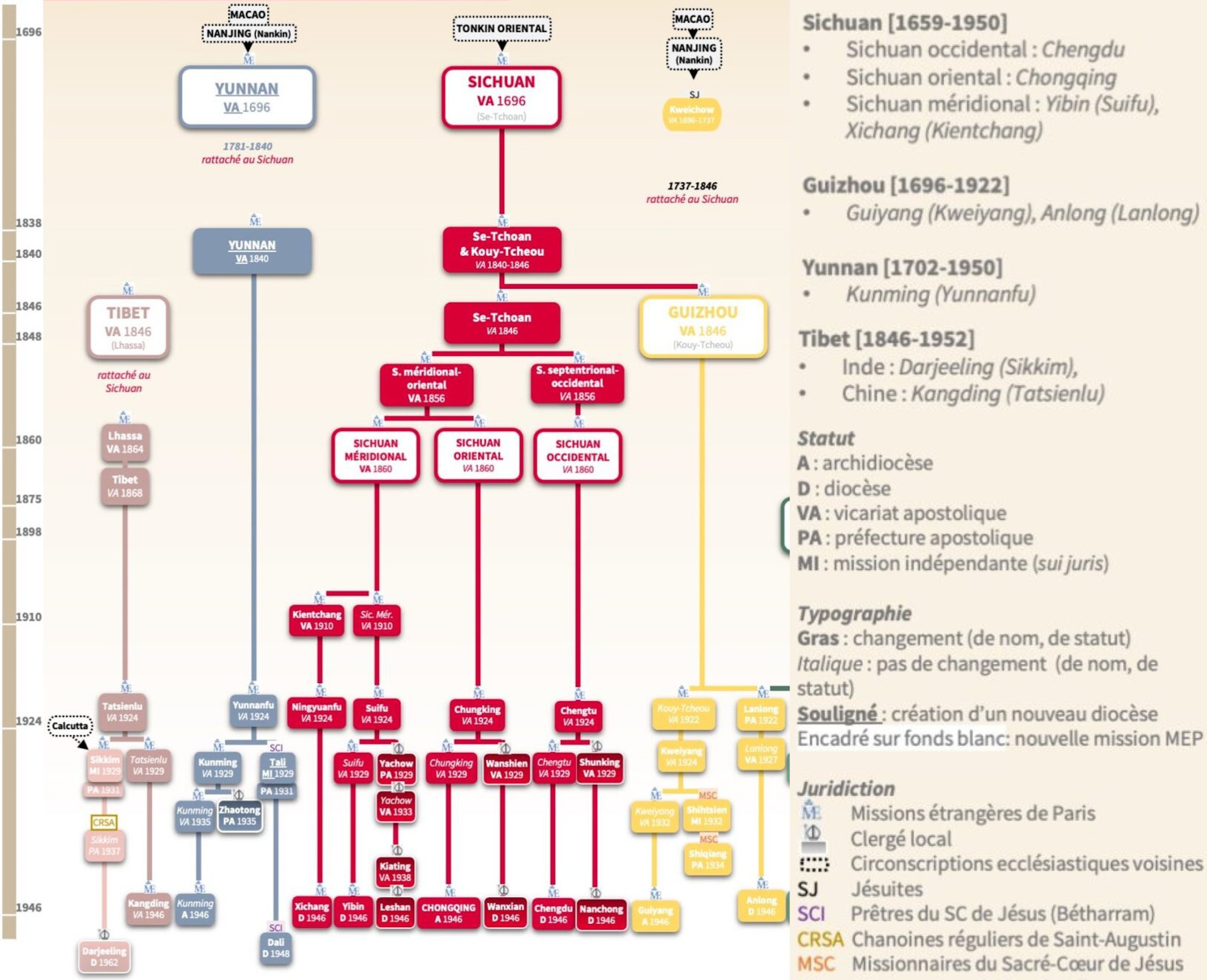
Genealogy of MEP ecclesiastical jurisdiction in Sichuan, with its three attachments: Tibet, Yunnan and Guizhou

All the Catholic dioceses in Sichuan are part of the Latin Church, which had been in full communion with the Pope in Rome until the establishment of the state-sanctioned Catholic Patriotic Church (CPC, 1957) after the fall of mainland China to communism (1949). The formation of the CPC was instigated by the Protestant Three-Self Patriotic Movement (1954). Pope Pius XII's 1954 encyclical Ad Sinarum gentem spoke out against the three-self formula, arguing that independence would make a church no longer Catholic, because it would negate the catholicity and universality of the church. In 1958, the first CPC bishops were illicitly appointed without reference to Rome or the Pope.

The first bishopric covering the whole province was erected as the Apostolic Vicariate of Szechwan on 15 October 1696, having its headquarters in Chengdu (Chengtu). Three major territorial reorganizations took place during the 19th century. On 27 March 1846, part of its western territory was split off to form the Apostolic Vicariate of Lhasa, which marked the beginning of the Paris Foreign Missions Society's Tibetan Mission. On 2 April 1856, Chongqing (Chungking) and its surrounding areas were organized into the nascent Apostolic Vicariate of Southeastern Szechwan. As a result of the division, the bishopric of Chengdu was renamed as the Apostolic Vicariate of Northwestern Szechwan. On 24 January 1860, the Apostolic Vicariate of Southern Szechwan was established for the Southern Szechwan Mission centered in Suifu.

On 11 April 1946, Pope Pius XII established the Catholic hierarchy in China. The Apostolic Vicariate of Chungking was elevated to the rank of archdiocese. The seven other apostolic vicariates of Sichuan and Tibet were elevated to dioceses, namely, Wanhsien of the Eastern Szechwan Mission; Chengtu and Shunking of the Western Szechwan Mission; Suifu, Ningyuan and Kiating of the Southern Szechwan Mission; and Tatsienlu of the Tibetan Mission.

=== Jurisdictional changes ===
Jurisdictional changes made by the state-sanctioned Catholic Patriotic Church and the Bishops' Conference of Catholic Church in China took place in the 1980s and the 1990s. On 24 March 1984, the territory of the Diocese of Kangding (Tatsienlu) was placed under the jurisdiction of the Bishop of Ningyuan. On 7 March 1993, the Diocese of Jiading (Kiating) assumed authority over Kangding. The Archdiocese of Chongqing and the Diocese of Wanxian (Wanhsien) were split off from Sichuan after the separation of Chongqing from the province on 4 March 1997.

=== List of dioceses ===
==== Eastern Szechwan Mission ====
Diocese	French	Former name/spelling	Cathedral	History	Founded	Ref.
Archdiocese of Chongqing	Tchong-kin-fou	Chungking	St. Joseph's Cathedral, Chongqing	•2 April 1856: Established as the Apostolic Vicariate of Southeastern Szechwan with territory from the Apostolic Vicariate of Szechwan •24 January 1860: Renamed as the Apostolic Vicariate of Eastern Szechwan •3 December 1924: Renamed as the Apostolic Vicariate of Chungking •2 August 1929: Lost territory to establish the Apostolic Vicariate of Wanhsien •11 April 1946: Elevated as the Metropolitan Archdiocese of Chungking	1856	
Diocese of Wanxian (Diocese of Wanzhou)	Ouan-hien	Wanhsien	Immaculate Conception Cathedral, Wanzhou	•2 August 1929: Established as the Apostolic Vicariate of Wanhsien (today known as Wanzhou) with territory from the Apostolic Vicariate of Chungking •11 April 1946: Elevated as the Diocese of Wanhsien	1929	
Map of the Eastern Szechwan Mission

==== Western Szechwan Mission ====
Diocese	French	Former name/spelling	Cathedral	History	Founded	Ref.
Diocese of Chengdu	Tchen-tou-fou	Chengtu	Immaculate Conception Cathedral, Chengdu	•15 October 1696: Established as the Apostolic Vicariate of Szechwan •1715: Gained territory from the suppressed Apostolic Vicariate of Kweichow •1781: Gained territory from the suppressed Apostolic Vicariate of Yunnan •24 August 1840: Lost territory to re-establish the Apostolic Vicariate of Yunnan •27 March 1846: Lost territory to establish the Apostolic Vicariate of Lhasa and re-establish the Apostolic Vicariate of Kweichow •2 April 1856: Renamed as the Apostolic Vicariate of Northwestern Szechwan, a.k.a. Apostolic Vicariate of Western Szechwan; lost territory to establish the Apostolic Vicariate of Southeastern Szechwan •24 January 1860: Lost territory to establish the Apostolic Vicariate of Southern Szechwan •3 December 1924: Renamed as the Apostolic Vicariate of Chengtu •2 August 1929: Lost territory to establish the Apostolic Vicariate of Shunking •11 April 1946: Elevated as the Diocese of Chengtu	1696	
Diocese of Shunqing (Diocese of Nanchong)	Choen-kin-fou	Shunking	Sacred Heart of Jesus Cathedral, Nanchong	•2 August 1929: Established as the Apostolic Vicariate of Shunking (today known as Nanchong) with territory from the Apostolic Vicariate of Chengtu •11 April 1946: Elevated as the Diocese of Shunking	1929	
Map of the Western Szechwan Mission

==== Southern Szechwan Mission ====
Diocese	French	Former name/spelling	Cathedral	History	Founded	Ref.
Diocese of Suifu (Diocese of Yibin)	Suifou; Souifou; Su-tcheou-fou	Suifu	Blessed Sacrament Cathedral, Yibin	•24 January 1860: Established as the Apostolic Vicariate of Southern Szechwan with territory from the Apostolic Vicariate of Northwestern Szechwan •12 August 1910: Lost territory to establish the Apostolic Vicariate of Kienchang •3 December 1924: Renamed as the Apostolic Vicariate of Suifu (today known as Yibin) •10 July 1929: Lost territory to establish the Apostolic Prefecture of Yachow •11 April 1946: Elevated as the Diocese of Suifu	1860	
Diocese of Ningyuan (Diocese of Xichang)	Si-tchang; Kien-tchang; Lin-yuen-fou	Sichang; Kienchang; Ningyüanfu	Cathedral of the Angels, Xichang	•12 August 1910: Established as the Apostolic Vicariate of Kienchang (today known as Xichang, capital of Nosuland) with territory from the Apostolic Vicariate of Southern Szechwan •3 December 1924: Renamed as the Apostolic Vicariate of Ningyüanfu (today known as Xichang) •11 April 1946: Elevated as the Diocese of Ningyüan	1910	
Diocese of Jiading (Diocese of Leshan)	Kia-tin-fou	Kiating	Sacred Heart of Jesus Cathedral, Leshan	•10 July 1929: Established as the Apostolic Prefecture of Yachow (today known as Ya'an) with territory from the Apostolic Vicariate of Suifu •3 March 1933: Elevated as the Apostolic Vicariate of Yachow •9 February 1938: See transferred and title changed to the Apostolic Vicariate of Kiating (today known as Leshan) •11 April 1946: Elevated as the Diocese of Kiating	1929	
Map of the Southern Szechwan Mission

==== Tibetan Mission ====
Diocese	French	Former name/spelling	Cathedral	History	Founded	Ref.
Diocese of Kangding	Ta-tsien-lou	Kangting; Tatsienlu	Sacred Heart Cathedral, Kangding	•27 March 1846: Established as the Apostolic Vicariate of Lhassa (Lhasa) with territory from the Apostolic Vicariate of Szechwan and the Apostolic Vicariate of Tibet-Hindustan •28 July 1868: Renamed as the Apostolic Vicariate of Thibet (Tibet) •3 December 1924: Renamed as the Apostolic Vicariate of Tatsienlu (today known as Kangding, in Sichuanese Tibet) •15 December 1929: Lost territory to establish the Mission sui iuris of Sikkim •11 April 1946: Elevated as the Diocese of Kangting	1846	
Map of the Tibetan Mission

=== Gallery ===
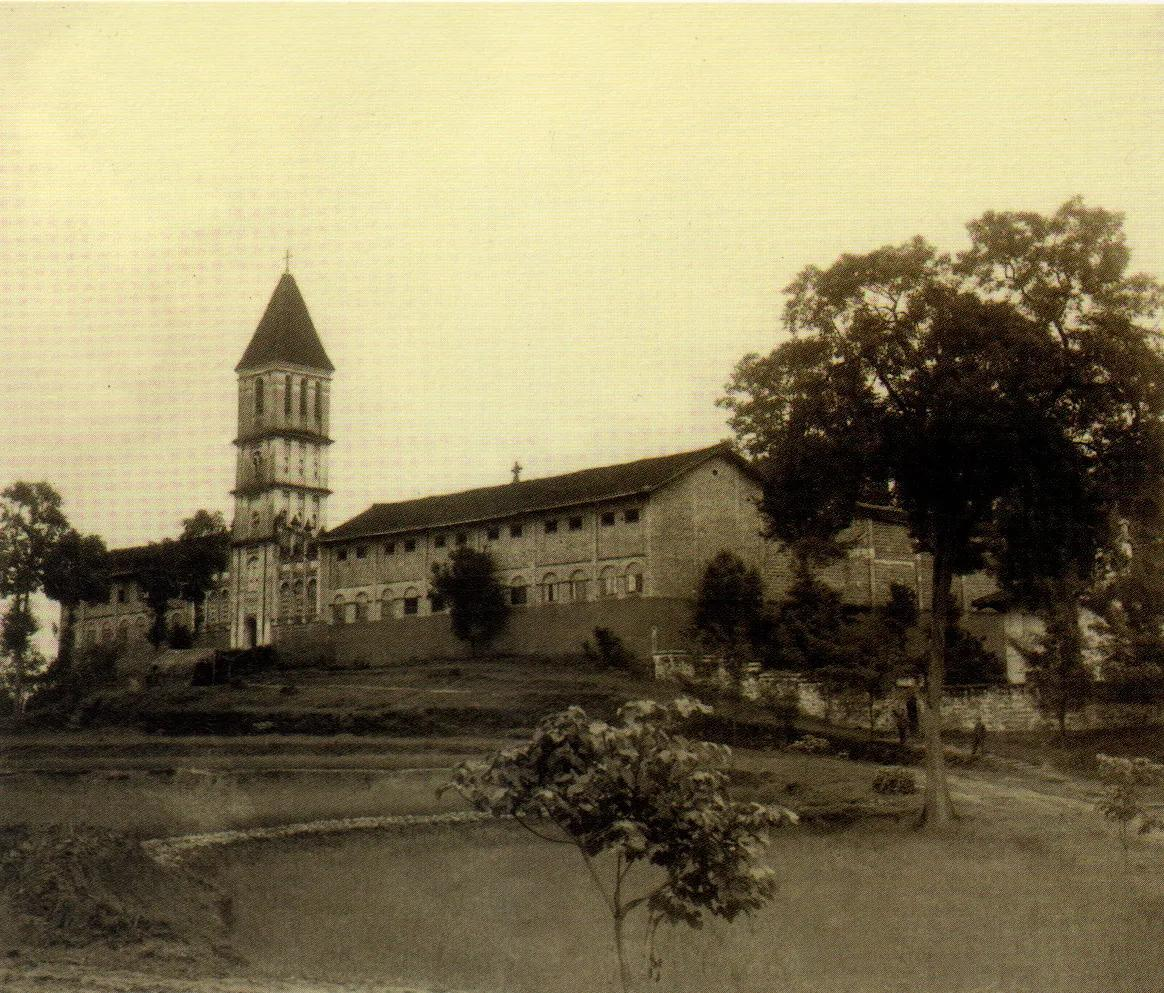
Ma Pao Tchang Church (Archdiocese of Chongqing)

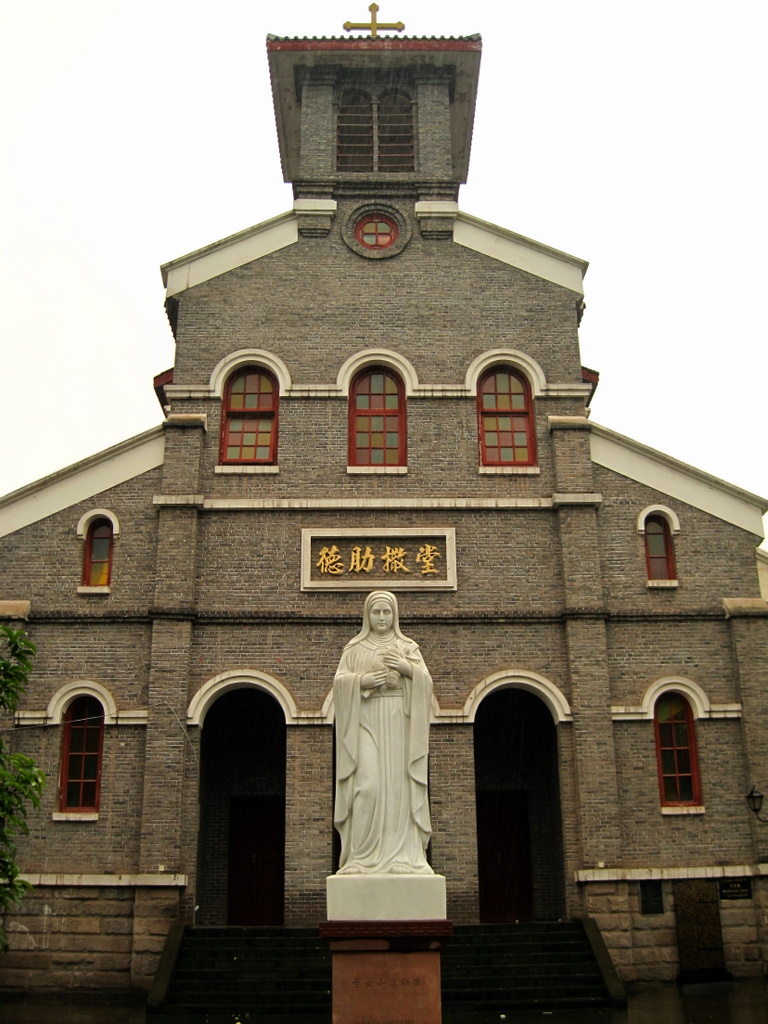
St. Thérèse of Lisieux Church, Chongqing (Archdiocese of Chongqing)

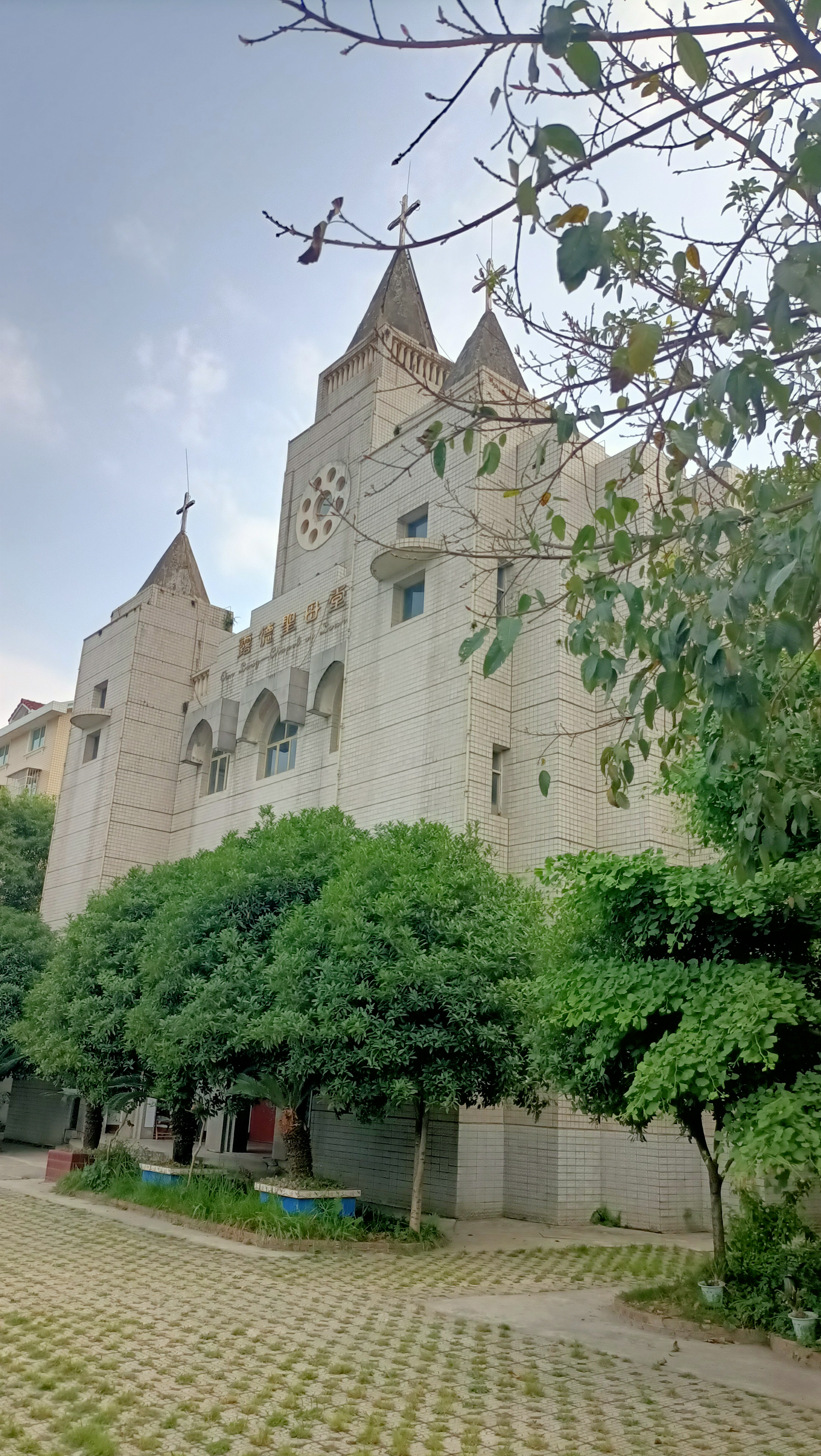
Our Lady of Lourdes Church, Mianyang (Diocese of Chengdu)

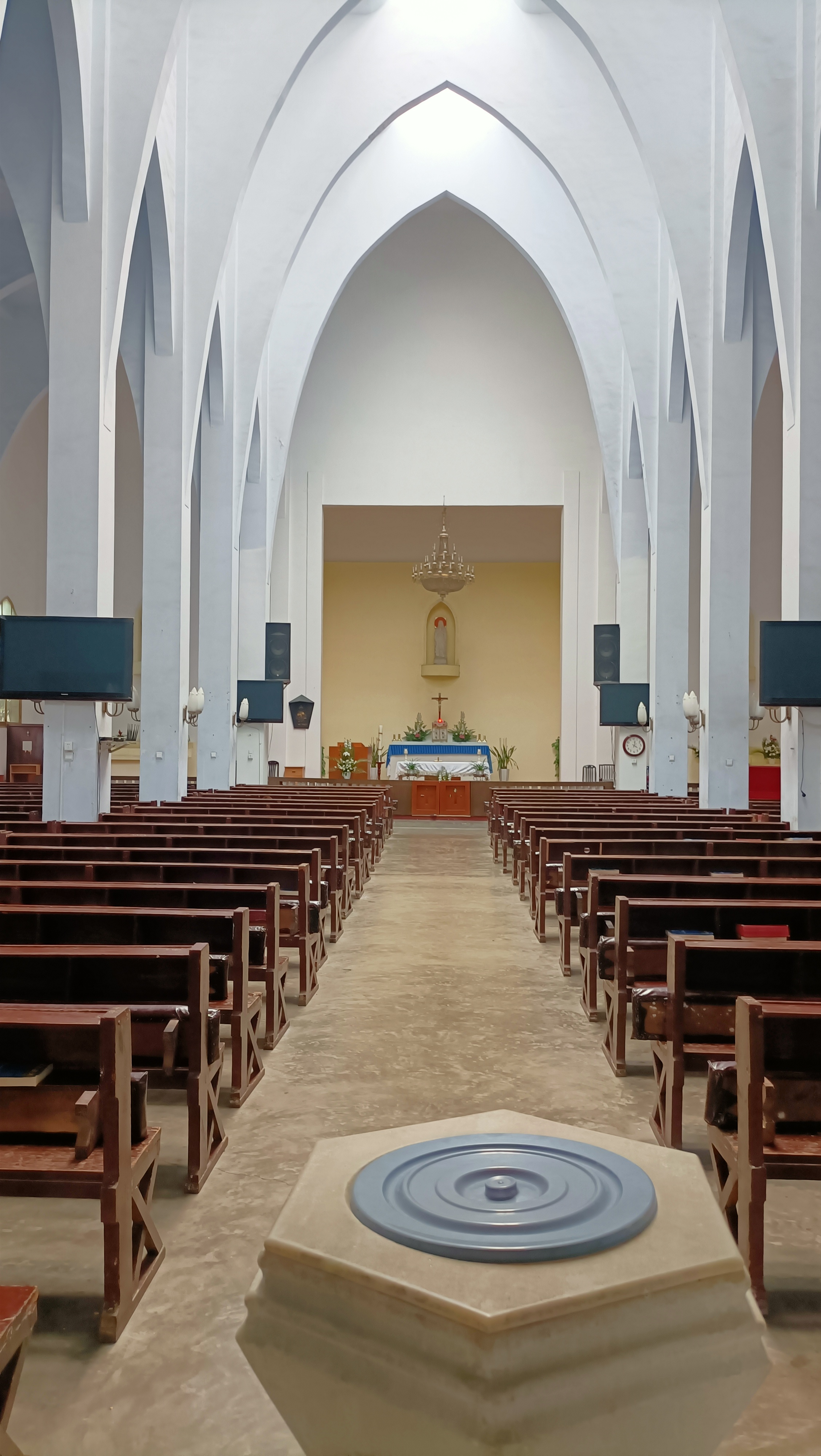
Interior of Our Lady of Lourdes Church at Mianyang

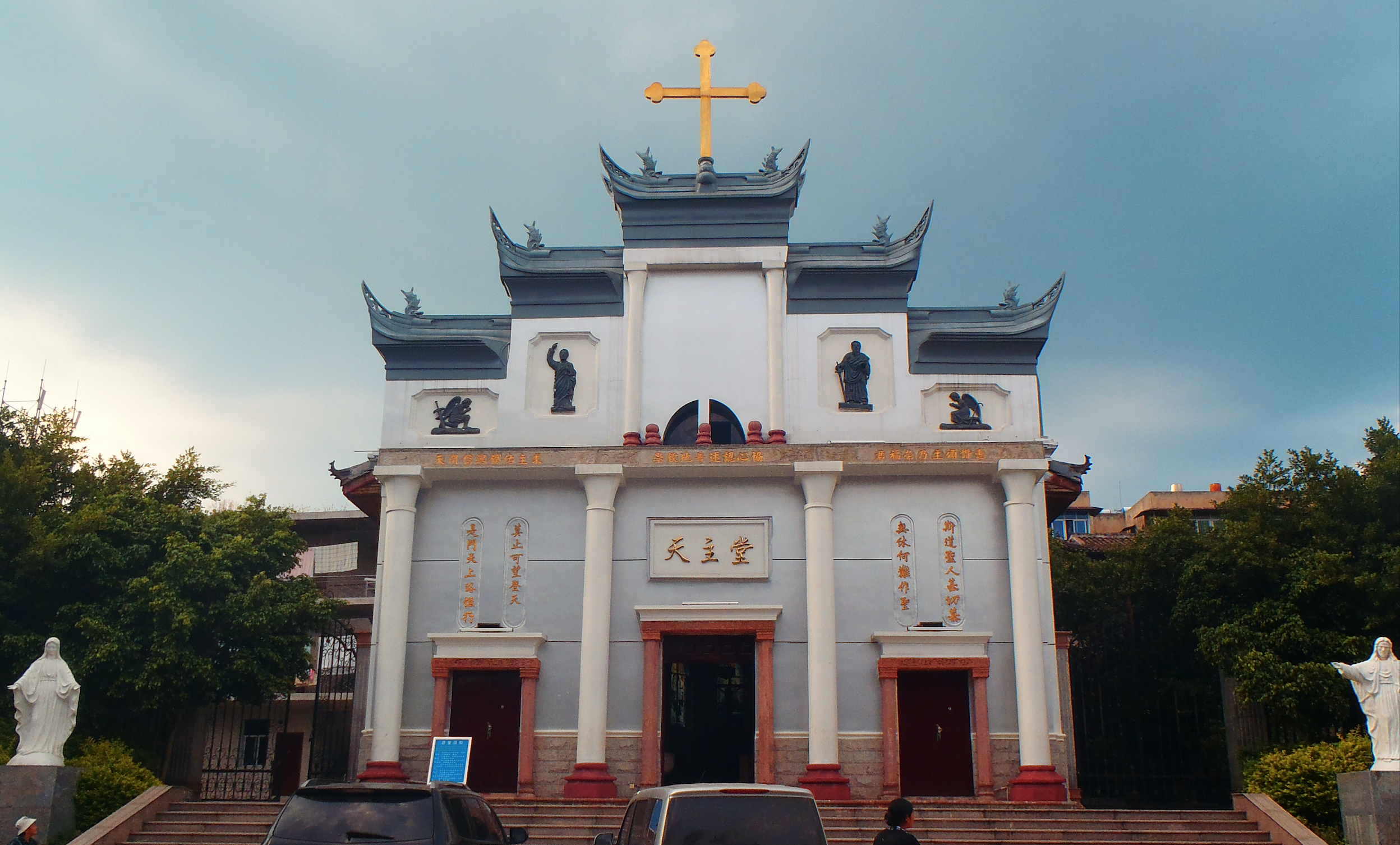
Cathedral of the Angels, Xichang (Diocese of Ningyuan)

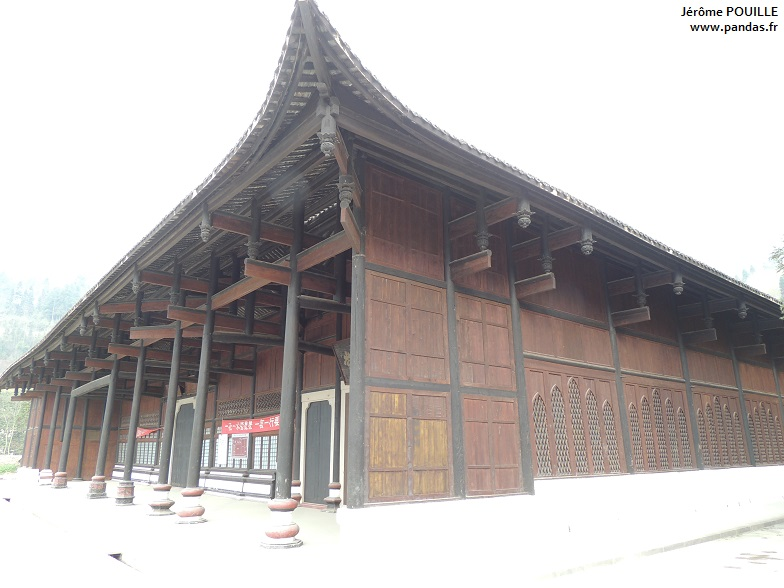
Annunciation Church, Dengchigou (Diocese of Jiading)

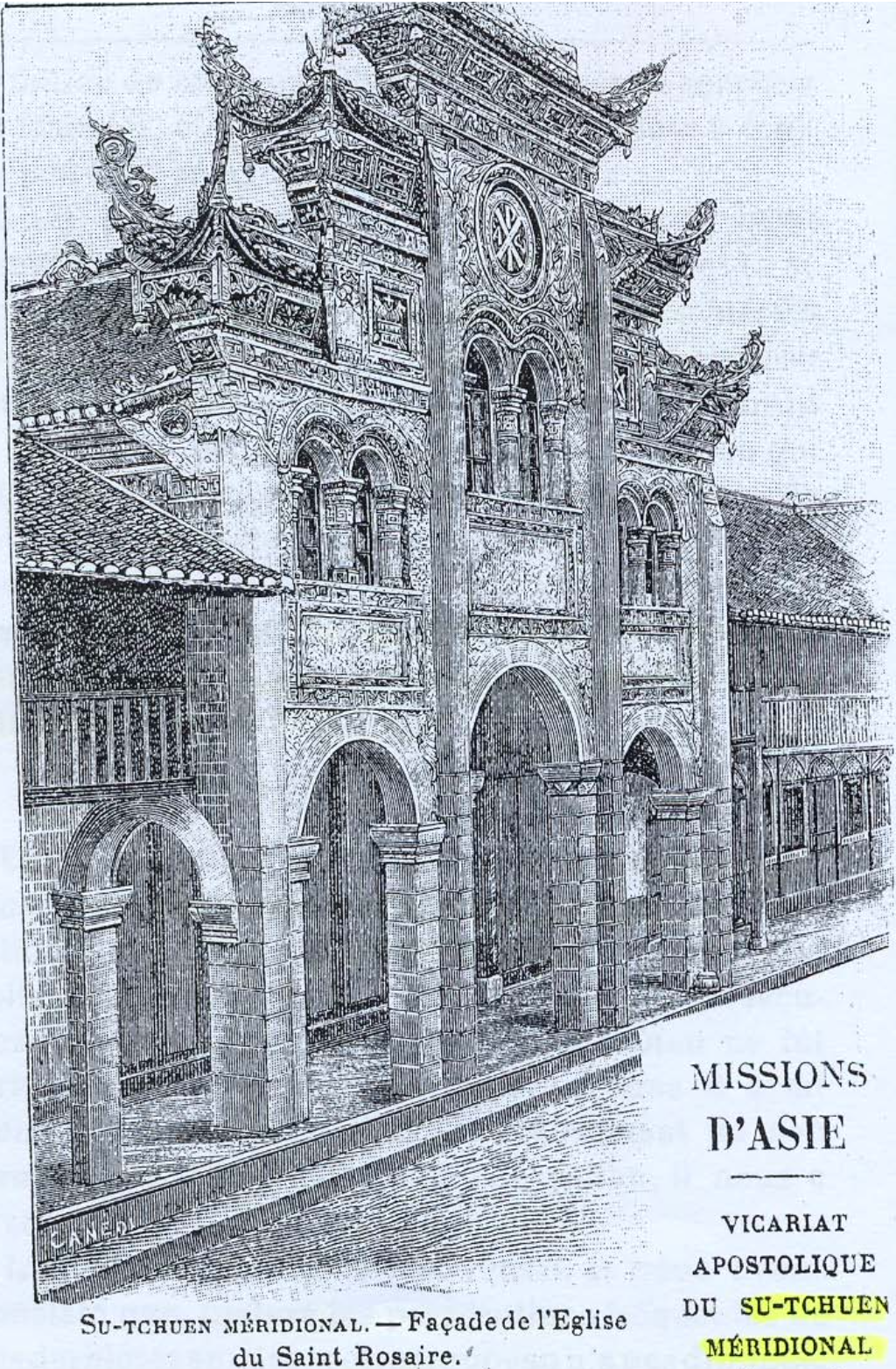
Holy Rosary Church, Yibin (Diocese of Suifu)

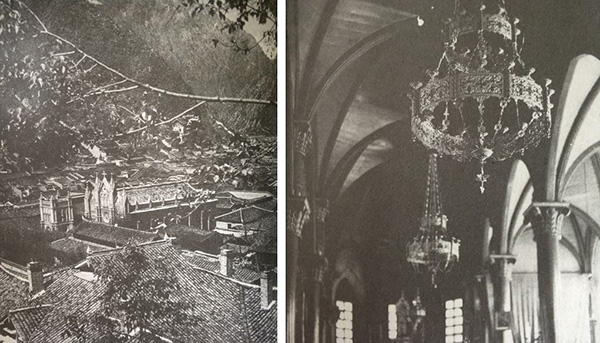
Exterior and interior of the former Sacred Heart Cathedral at Kangding (Diocese of Kangding)

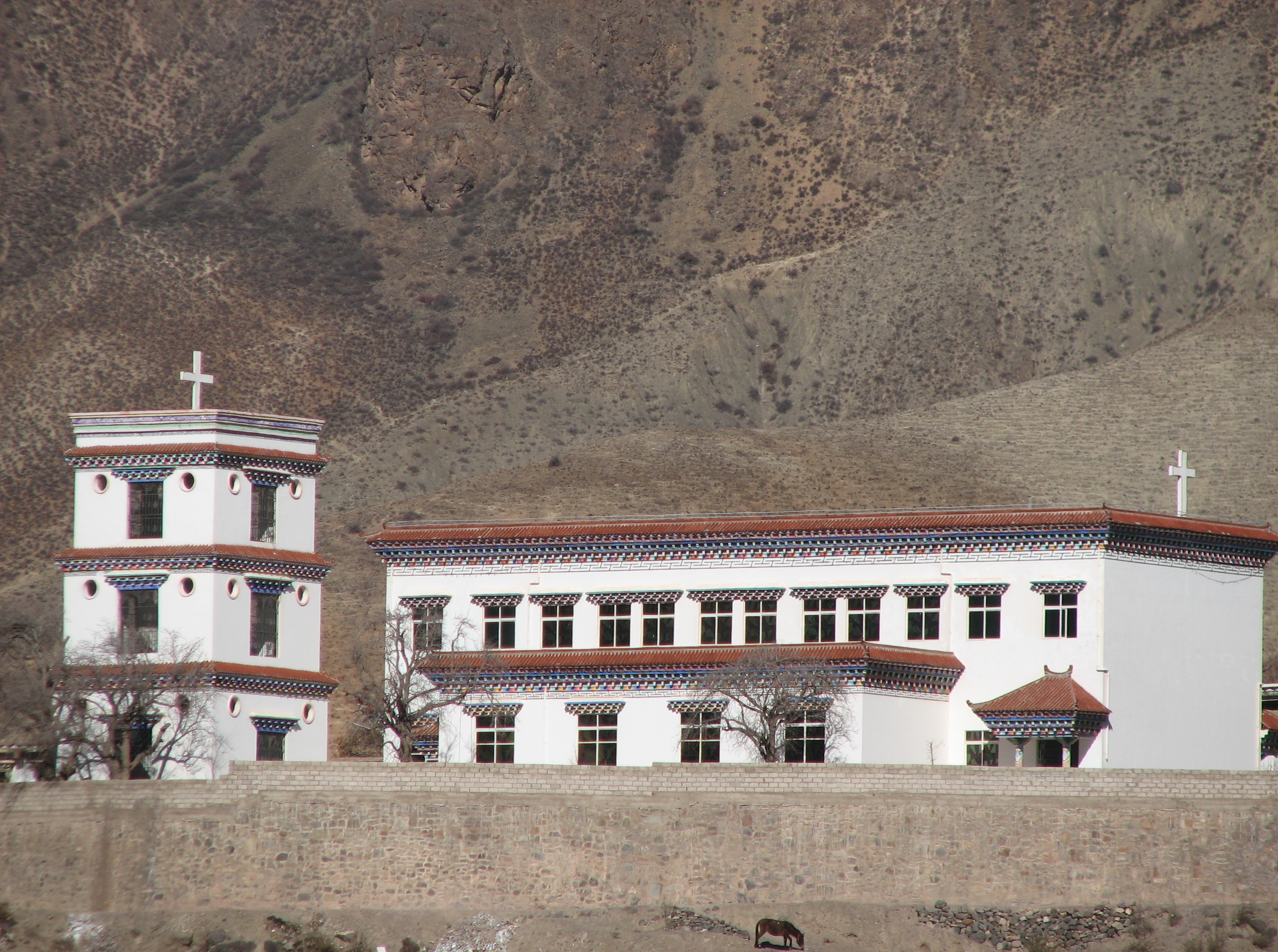
Our Lady of the Sacred Heart Church, Yerkalo (Diocese of Kangding)

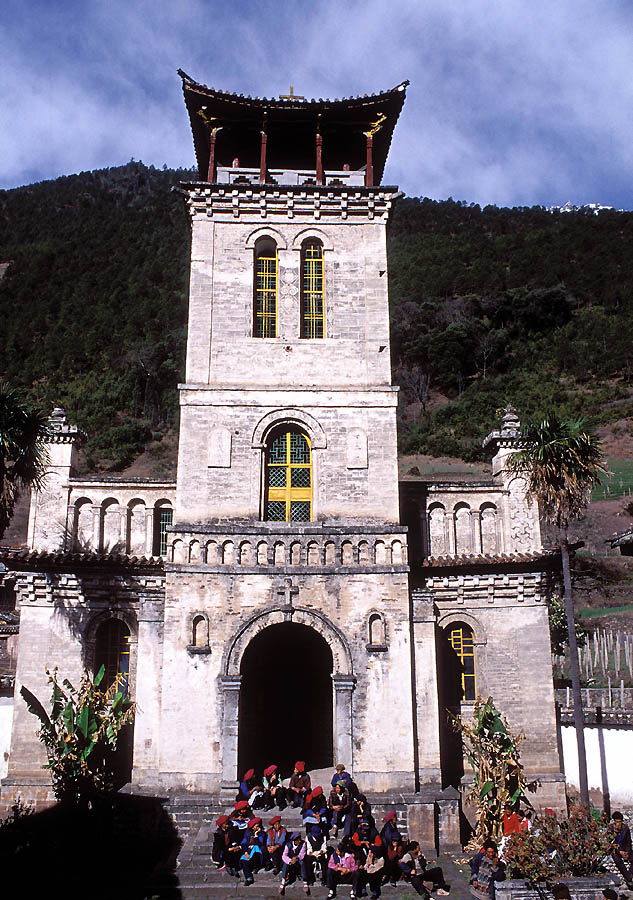
Sacred Heart Church, Cizhong (Diocese of Kangding) (Note: The Cizhong Catholic Church at Deqin falls under the administration of the Diocese of Dali, although it was formerly part of the Diocese of Kangding; and from the Vatican's perspective, the church still belongs to the Diocese of Kangding.)

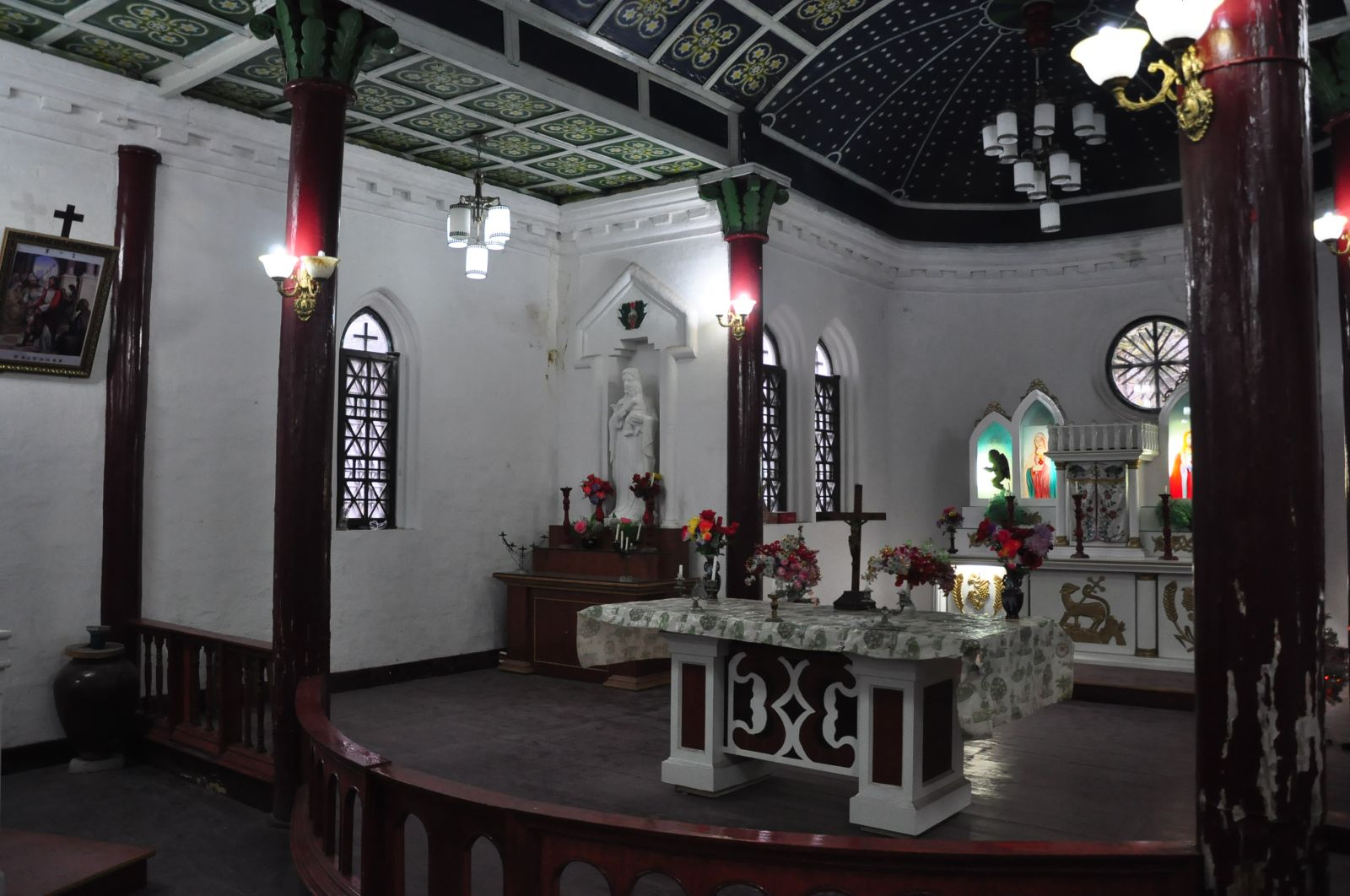
Altar of St. Anne's Church, Moxi (Diocese of Kangding)

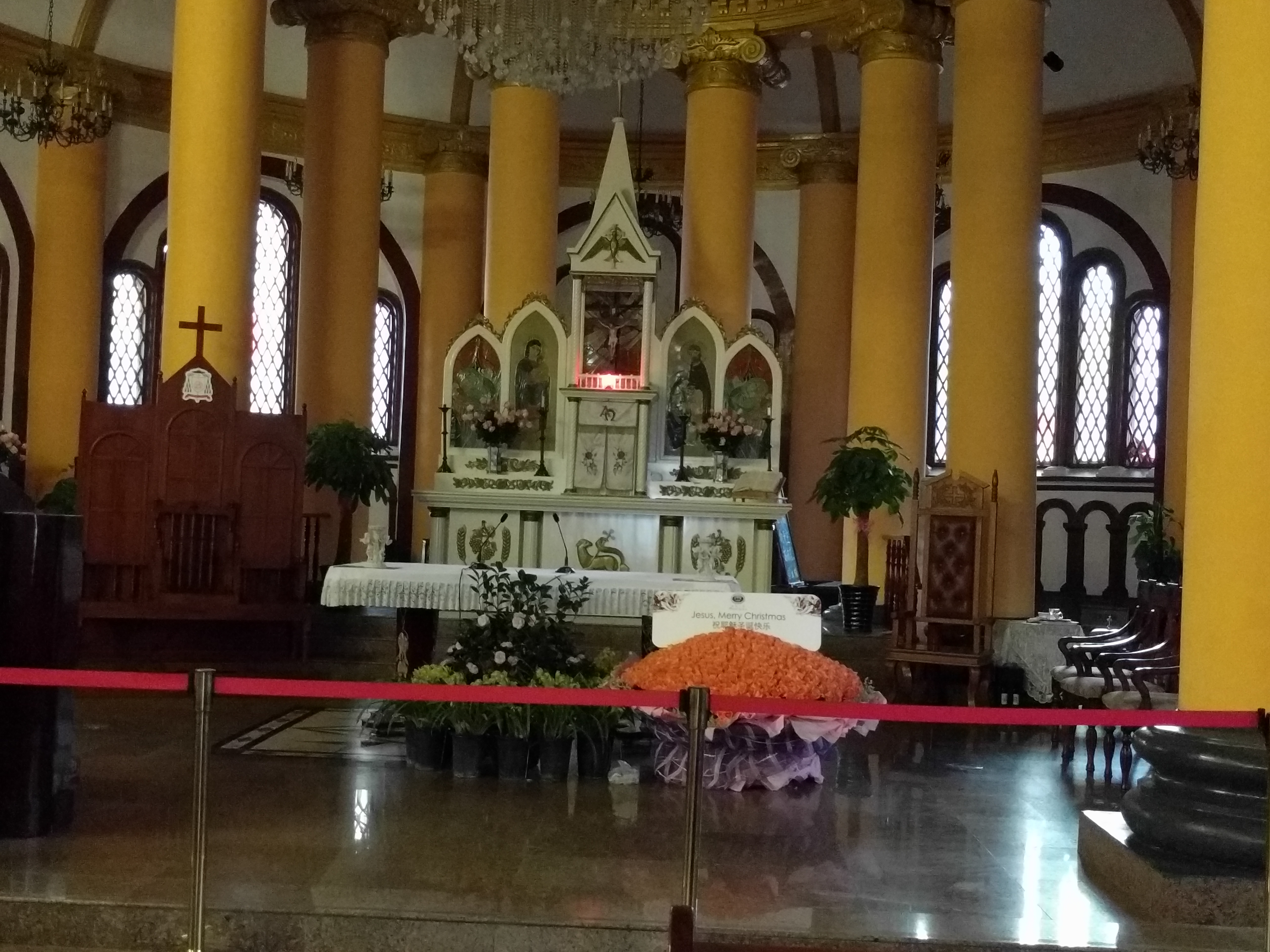
Altar of the Cathedral of the Immaculate Conception at Chengdu (Diocese of Chengdu)

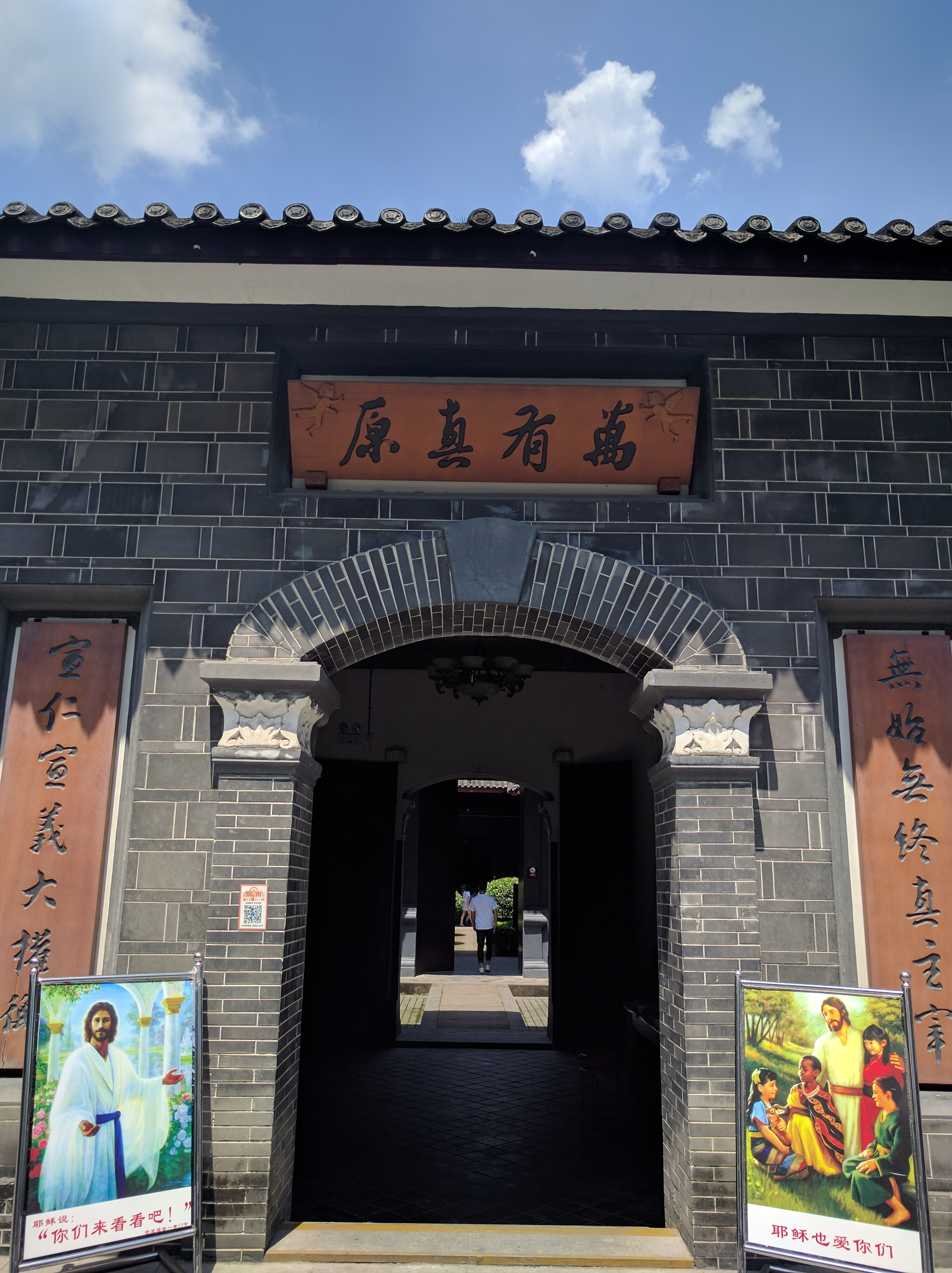
Diocesan curia of Bishop of Chengdu

== Demographics ==
=== Before 1949 ===
The number of Catholics grew rapidly in the latter half of the 18th century. In 1756 there were 4,000 Catholics and two local priests. In 1802, the number increased tenfold with 40,000 Catholics and 16 local priests. By 1870, the Church in Sichuan had 80,000 baptized members, which was the largest number of Catholics in the entire country. The number increased to 118,724 members in 1911 during the fall of the last imperial dynasty. Almost 8,000 adults received baptism during the year of 1918. By the end of 1921, the number of Catholics had reached 143,747. They worshipped in 826 chapels and churches scattered throughout the province. The Church maintained nearly 400 parish schools of primary grade with over 7,500 students.

=== After 1949 ===
According to the statistics published on Catholic-Hierarchy.org before 20 November 2005, there were 134,000 Catholics in Sichuan (Ecclesiastical Province of Chongqing), 0.25 per cent of the population (53,145,000).

By the end of 2011, Catholics in the dioceses of Chengdu, Shunqing, Jiading, Suifu, Ningyuan numbered 110,000, 80,000, 60,000, 30,000 and 30,000 people, respectively, making a total of 310,000 faithful (not including underground church Catholics). This data did not include Catholics in Chongqing (dioceses of Chongqing and Wanxian) and Tibet (Diocese of Kangding), due to the separation of Chongqing from Sichuan in 1997 and the diocesan jurisdiction changes took place in the 1980s and the 1990s. A 1989 data suggests that there were approximately 10,000 Tibetan Catholics in the Diocese of Kangding, which at the time was under the jurisdiction of the Diocese of Ningyuan.

According to Asia Harvest, estimates from 2020 suggest that of the entire population (78,486,760) about 1.32 per cent was Catholic (1,036,538), among whom 455,090 belonged to the state-sanctioned Catholic Patriotic Church (CPC), and 581,449 were underground church Catholics. In the case of Chongqing, Catholics accounted for about 1.76 per cent (478,191) of the entire population (27,179,577). This number was composed of 183,920 CPC Catholics and 294,271 underground church Catholics.

== Impact ==
The Jesuit fathers Lodovico Buglio and Gabriel de Magalhães were ordered to construct a celestial globe, a terrestrial globe and a sundial during the reign of Zhang Xianzhong. These large devices are given a detailed description in An Account of the Entry of the Catholic Religion into Sichuan as being "really unique at that time, and they amazed those who saw them". Yuan Tingdong wrote in his 1998 book Cultural History of Ba–Shu, that "from the information currently available, this is the first time that modern Western scientific achievements have appeared in the Ba–Shu region". During Zhang Xianzhong's massacre, some Sichuanese Catholics fled south to Yunnan province, which marked the beginning of the spread of Catholicism to Yunnan.

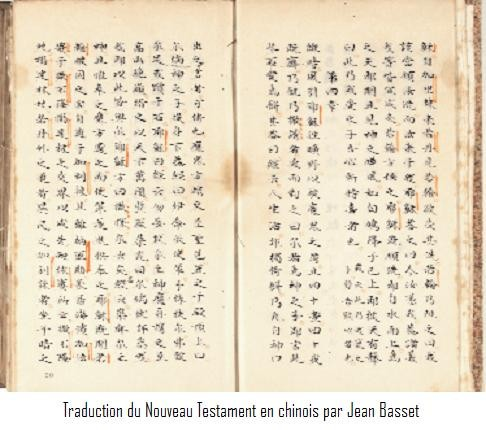
Basset–Su Chinese New Testament, 18th century

Jean Basset, a Lyonese missionary of Paris Foreign Missions Society, undertook the translation of the New Testament from Latin Vulgate in Sichuan, with the assistance of a local convert Johan Su. The translation came to a halt after the completion of the first chapter of the Epistle to the Hebrews, due to Basset's death in 1707. One manuscript of this translation, now known as Basset–Su Chinese New Testament, was acquired by the British Museum in 1739. In 1805, Robert Morrison, the pioneer of Protestant missions in China, reproduced this manuscript and subsequently used it as the basis for his own Bible translation, which paved the way for the entire Protestant missionary enterprise in that country.

In the 18th century, the distinctiveness of the Catholics of Sichuan became especially evident in the local society. Their way of life, their adherence to Gospel values, their spiritual dynamism and their strong sense of community set them apart from the rest of society. A Mandarin of the court of Qianlong observed this about them: "They are neither licentious nor gamblers or robbers. They are satisfied with one woman and never touch another man's wife." During this time, the Church in Sichuan produced a number of itinerant catechists (i.e. local missionaries) thanks to a well-organized training system. Since 1774, evangelization of Guizhou province was carried out by Jean-Martin Moye, provicar of Eastern Szechwan, and a Sichuanese missionary, Benoît Sen. In 1798, Laurent Hou, (Note: Laurent Hou Che-lou or Lawrence Hu Shï-lu (Chinese: 胡世祿)) also a missionary from Sichuan, built a small church in Guiyang for the Catholic community of about 100 people, which later became the cathedral of the Archdiocese of Guiyang. Female missionaries to Guizhou such as Monique Sen, aunt of Benoît Sen, and Paule Song, evangelized among women. The 19th-century missionary Lucy Yi Zhenmei was martyred in Guizhou. She was canonized on 1 October 2000 by Pope John Paul II.

The First Synod of Sichuan convened by Bishop Gabriel-Taurin Dufresse on 2 September 1803 was the first Catholic synod held in China. In 1822, the results were published in Rome as Synodus Vicariatus Sutchuensis, which had guided the apostolate in this province and in many other regions of China until replaced by the decisions of the Council of Shanghai in 1924. The Sichuan Synod was also proclaimed as an official legislation in the Korean Catholic Church in 1857 by Siméon-François Berneux, the fourth Apostolic Vicar of Korea.

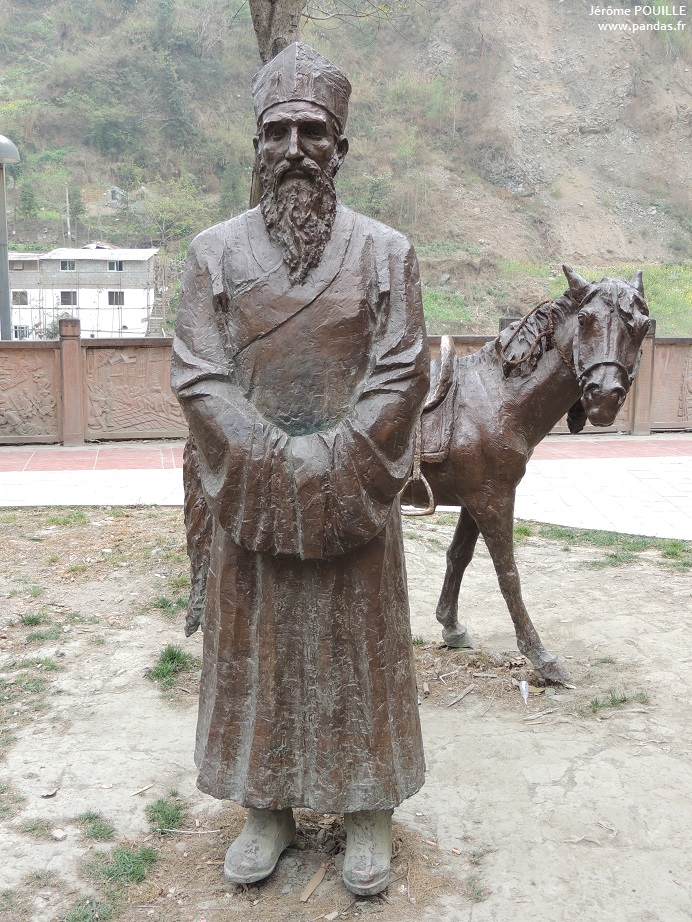
Statue of Father Armand David in Baoxing County

French missionary botanists, such as Jean-André Soulié, Jean-Théodore Monbeig and Paul Guillaume Farges, collected large numbers of plant, fungal and animal specimens in Sichuan and eastern Tibet. Among them, the Lazarist father Armand David is the most well-known missionary. He discovered the giant panda in 1869 while doing the work of evangelism and scientific research at the Annunciation Church of Dengchigou, Baoxing County. The records of Father David's experiences, research and the history of the discovery of the pandas are kept in the Annunciation Church. A small town named David was built near Dengchigou in his honour.

The vicarial press of Eastern Szechwan—Imprimerie de la Sainte-Famille—was founded in 1899 in Chongqing by François-Marie-Joseph Gourdon. By 1949, the Imprimerie had produced approximately 400,000 publications, which made it the Catholic press with second highest number of publications in the entire country. Well-known ones include the weekly newspaper La Vérité, established in 1904, An Account of the Entry of the Catholic Religion into Sichuan (1918), and An Account of the Entry of the Catholic Religion into Anyo (1924). The Imprimerie also became the main promoter of Ecclesiastical Rituals and Practices (Note: Ecclesiastical Rituals and Practices (traditional Chinese: 聖教禮規; simplified Chinese: 圣教礼规; pinyin: Shèngjiào Lǐguī; Sichuanese romanization: Shen^{4} Chiao^{4} Li^{3} Kue^{1})) by producing several of the book's reprint editions, which was originally published in 1900 by the Apostolic Vicariate of Southern Szechwan, with the approval of Bishop Marc Chatagnon. Ecclesiastical Rituals and Practices is the fruit of a century of accumulation of experience of the Paris Foreign Missions Society in Sichuan. The popularity of the book extended beyond the provincial boundary. In 1904, it was published in British Hong Kong by the Imprimerie de Nazareth; and in 1932 in Shanghai by the Imprimerie de l'Orphelinat de T'ou-sè-wè.

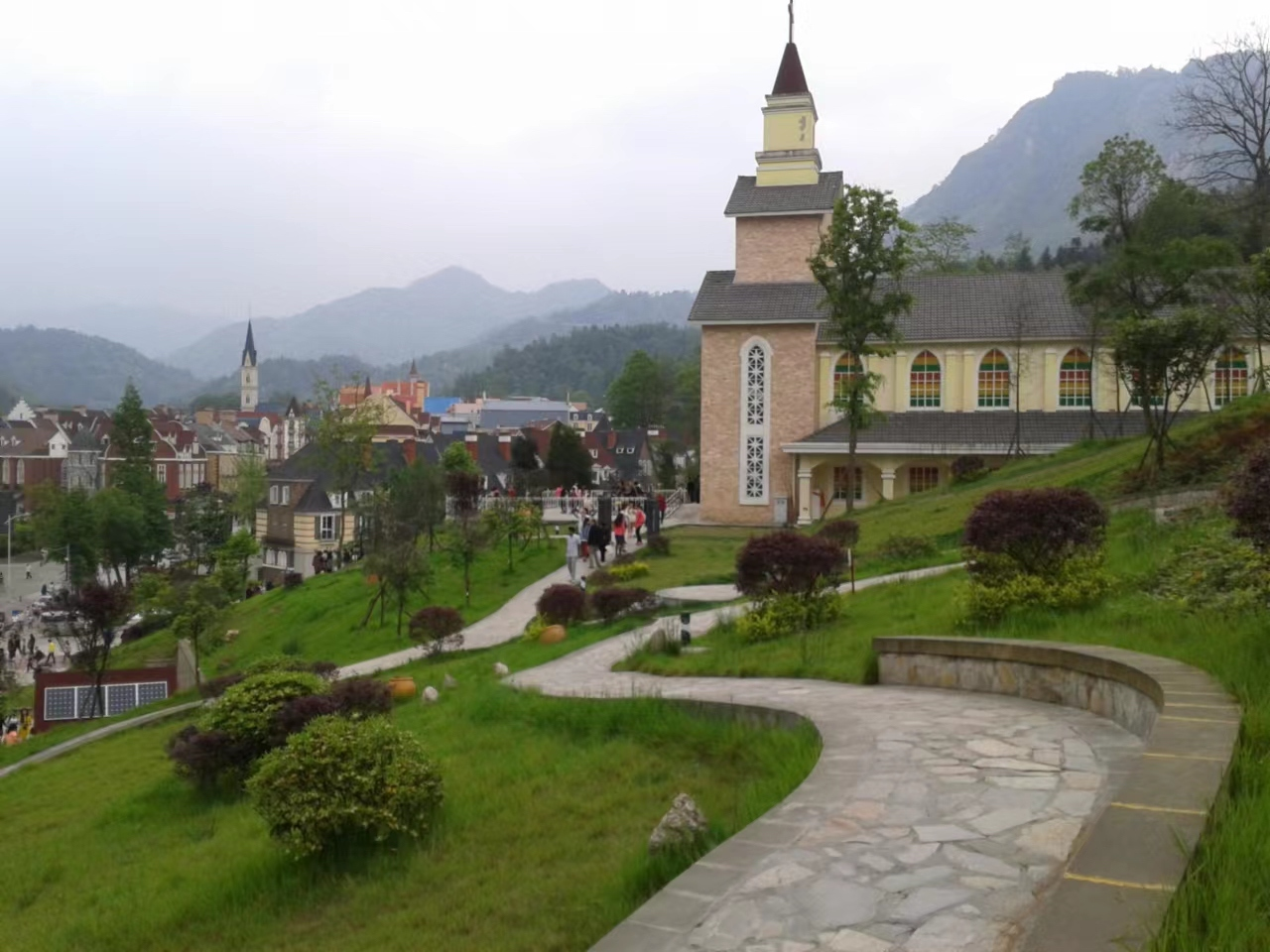
A Catholic church overlooking Bailu Town

Bailu, under the administration of Chengdu, has been developed into a "French town" due to its French Catholic heritage. According to Liao Xianghui, however, the real reason for this designation is to serve tourism and economic development: "This led to the commercialization of once authentic religious sites for tourism and economic development as part of the secularization process. [...] Catholicism's public influence on tourism and economic development has been increasing, while its activities and church attendance have not followed synchronously."

=== In popular culture ===
The 1936 novel Ripple on Stagnant Water by Li Chie-ren gives a detailed account of the conflicts among the three parties in the Chengdu area during the 1890s, namely, the local Christian communities, Elder Brothers Society and the bureaucracy. The novel was adapted into a 12-episode television series in 1988 titled A Woman to Three Men, a feature film in 1992 titled Ripples Across Stagnant Water, and a namesake series in 2008.

== Saints, martyrs and pilgrimage destinations ==
In the sense of the greater Sichuanese Catholic world, including the Tibet Autonomous Region and northwestern Yunnan under the jurisdiction of the Diocese of Kangding. Listed are those born, died, or lived in the ecclesiastical jurisdictional areas of Sichuan. In alphabetical order by surname:

=== Saints, blesseds and servants of God ===
Image	Name	Date of birth	Place of birth	Date of death	Place of death
	S.D. Augustin Bourry	27 December 1826	La Chapelle-Largeau, France	1 September 1854	Sommeu, Tibet
–	Saint John Chen Xianheng	1820	Chengdu, Sichuan	18 February 1862	Guiyang, Guizhou
	Saint Gabriel-Taurin Dufresse	8 December 1750	Lezoux, France	14 September 1815	Chengdu, Sichuan
–	Blessed Lucien Galan	9 December 1921	Golinhac, France	12 May 1968	Pakse, Kingdom of Laos
	Saint Laurent-Joseph-Marius Imbert	23 March 1796	Marignane, France	21 September 1839	Saenamteo, Kingdom of Korea
	S.D. Nicolas Krick	1 March 1819	Lixheim, France	1 September 1854	Sommeu, Tibet
–	Saint Paul Liu Hanzuo	1778	Lezhi, Sichuan	13 February 1818	Chengdu, Sichuan
–	Saint Thaddeus Liu Ruiting	1773	Qionglai, Sichuan	1823	Quxian, Sichuan
	Blessed Jean-Martin Moye	27 January 1730	Cutting, France	4 May 1793	Trier, Holy Roman Empire
	Blessed Maurice Tornay	31 August 1910	Orsières, Switzerland	11 August 1949	Cho La, Sichuan
–	Saint Agnes Tsao Kou Ying	28 April 1821	Wujiazhai, Guizhou	1 March 1856	Yaoshan, Guangxi
	Saint Lucy Yi Zhenmei	9 December 1815	Mianyang, Sichuan	19 February 1862	Guizhou
–	Saint Joseph Yuan Zaide	1766	Pengshui, Sichuan	1817	Chengdu, Sichuan
–	Saint Joseph Zhang Wenlan	1831	Sichuan	29 July 1861	Guizhou
	Saint Augustine Zhao Rong	1746	Wuchuan, Guizhou	1815	Chengdu, Sichuan

=== Non-canonized martyrs ===
Image	Name	Date of birth	Place of birth	Date of death	Place of death
	Baptistin Biron	30 June 1882	Paris, France	20 August 1935	Mabian, Sichuan
	Lucien Boiteux	8 February 1902	Surmont, France	17 June 1944	Ouitchenn, Sichuan
	Pierre-Marie Bourdonnec	18 June 1859	Ploumilliau, France	23 July 1905	Tatochilong, Yunnan
	Jean-Baptiste Brieux	6 February 1845	Bonboillon, France	8 September 1881	Batang, Sichuan
	Ferdinand Castanet	23 or 25 November 1866	Bordeaux, France	4 November 1911	Ko-o-ho, Sichuan
–	Joseph Delpon	19 April 1754	Diocese of Cahors, France	8 July 1785	Peking, Manchu China
–	Étienne Devaut	19 or 29 December 1744	Diocese of Tours, France	3 July 1785	Peking, Manchu China
	Jules Dubernard	8 August 1840	Ussel, France	26 July 1905	Tsekou, Yunnan
–	Gabriel Durand	31 January 1835	Lunel, France	28 September 1865	Kiona-tong, Yunnan
	Pierre Gilles	1 April 1829	Valréas, France	13 August 1869	Guiyang, Guizhou
	Jean-Baptiste Houillon	3 December 1825	Dommartin-lès-Remiremont, France	27 May 1871	Paris, France
	Jean Hue	21 January 1837	Flers, France	5 September 1873	Kien-kiang, Sichuan
–	Émile Levrel	4 March 1913	Le Verger, France	1 January 1956	Viengpapao, Thailand
	François Mabileau	1 March 1829	Paimbœuf, France	29 August 1865	Youyang, Sichuan
	Jean-Théodore Monbeig	22 October 1875	Salies-de-Béarn, France	12 June 1914	Litang, Sichuan
	Henri Mussot	26 June 1854	Ouge, France	5 April 1905	Batang, Sichuan
	Pascual Nadal Oltra	30 October 1884	Pego, Spain	4 December 1935	Zainlha, Sichuan
	Epifanio Pegoraro	14 April 1898	Montecchio Maggiore, Italy	4 December 1935	Zainlha, Sichuan
	Jean-François Rigaud	2 June 1834	Arc-et-Senans, France	2 January 1869	Youyang, Sichuan
	Jean-André Soulié	6 October 1858	Saint-Juéry, France	14 April 1905	Batang, Sichuan
–	Michel Tay	?	Sichuan	5 September 1873	Kien-kiang, Sichuan

=== Pilgrimage destinations ===
The churches listed below are two of the "four great pilgrimage destinations of the southwest". The other two are located in Guizhou province.

- Our Lady's Church and Twelve Apostles Square: both part of the complex of St. Andrew's Benedictine Monastery in "Foreigners' Hamlet", Xishan (lit. 'West Hill'), a scenic site in the suburbs of Shunqing, Nanchong.
- Our Lady of Mercy Church: located on Our Lady of Mercy Mountain in Nan'an, Chongqing. According to the local tradition, a Marian apparition occurred on the mountain, hence the name.

== Timeline of Eastern Szechwan Mission ==
The following table is based on An Account of the Entry of the Catholic Religion into Sichuan, (Note: Cited and stated in Cultural History of Ba–Shu.) published in 1918 by the Imprimerie de la Sainte-Famille for the Apostolic Vicariate of Eastern Szechwan. Except for Chengdu, Emeishan, Jintang, Leshan, Pengshan, Qiongzhou and Yibin, all the cities and counties are located in eastern Sichuan.

Location	Society	Date
Chengdu, Chongqing, Langzhong	Society of Jesus	before 1644
Anyue, Emeishan, Jintang, Leshan, Pengshan, Qiongzhou, Yibin	Society of Jesus, Congregation of the Mission	1662–1722
Liangping, Pengshui	Paris Foreign Missions Society	1704
Tongliang	Paris Foreign Missions Society	1720
Hechuan	Paris Foreign Missions Society	1723–1735
Wanxian	Paris Foreign Missions Society	1730
Guang'an, Yuechi	Paris Foreign Missions Society	1746
Dazhu	Paris Foreign Missions Society	1753
Changshou	Paris Foreign Missions Society	1756
Wusheng	Paris Foreign Missions Society	1760
Rongchang	Paris Foreign Missions Society	1769
Chengkou, Qijiang, Yongchuan	Paris Foreign Missions Society	1770
Dianjiang	Paris Foreign Missions Society	1779
Fengjie	Paris Foreign Missions Society	1781
Fengdu	Paris Foreign Missions Society	1782
Dachuan, Wushan	Paris Foreign Missions Society	1784
Quxian	Paris Foreign Missions Society	1790
Bishan	Paris Foreign Missions Society	1796
Wuxi, Yunyang	Paris Foreign Missions Society	1798
Kaizhou	Paris Foreign Missions Society	1810
Kaijiang, Zhongxian	Paris Foreign Missions Society	1861
Qianjiang, Shizhu, Xiushan, Youyang	Paris Foreign Missions Society	1863

== See also ==
Christianity in Sichuan

- Christianity in Sichuan
  - Church of the East in Sichuan
  - Protestantism in Sichuan
    - Anglicanism in Sichuan
    - Methodism in Sichuan
    - Quakerism in Sichuan
    - Baptist Christianity in Sichuan
    - Seventh-day Adventist Church in Sichuan
- Youyang anti-missionary riot

Catholicism in Sichuan's neighbouring regions

- Catholic Church in Tibet
- Catholic Church in Shaanxi
- Diocese of Hanzhong
- Apostolic Prefecture of Xining

Other related topics

- Catholic missions
- Anti-Christian Movement
- Antireligious campaigns of the Chinese Communist Party
- Jean-Charles Cornay – French missionary assigned to the Sichuan mission, but was stuck and martyred in Vietnam
- Francis Xavier Ford – American Catholic missionary in Guangdong province, tortured by Chinese communists and died in prison

Categories

- Category:Sichuanese Roman Catholics
- Category:Roman Catholic church buildings in Chongqing
- Category:Roman Catholic church buildings in Sichuan
- Category:Roman Catholic church buildings in Tibet
- Category:Roman Catholic missionaries in Sichuan
- Category:Roman Catholic missionaries in Tibet
