= Ripple on Stagnant Water =

Novel by Li Jieren

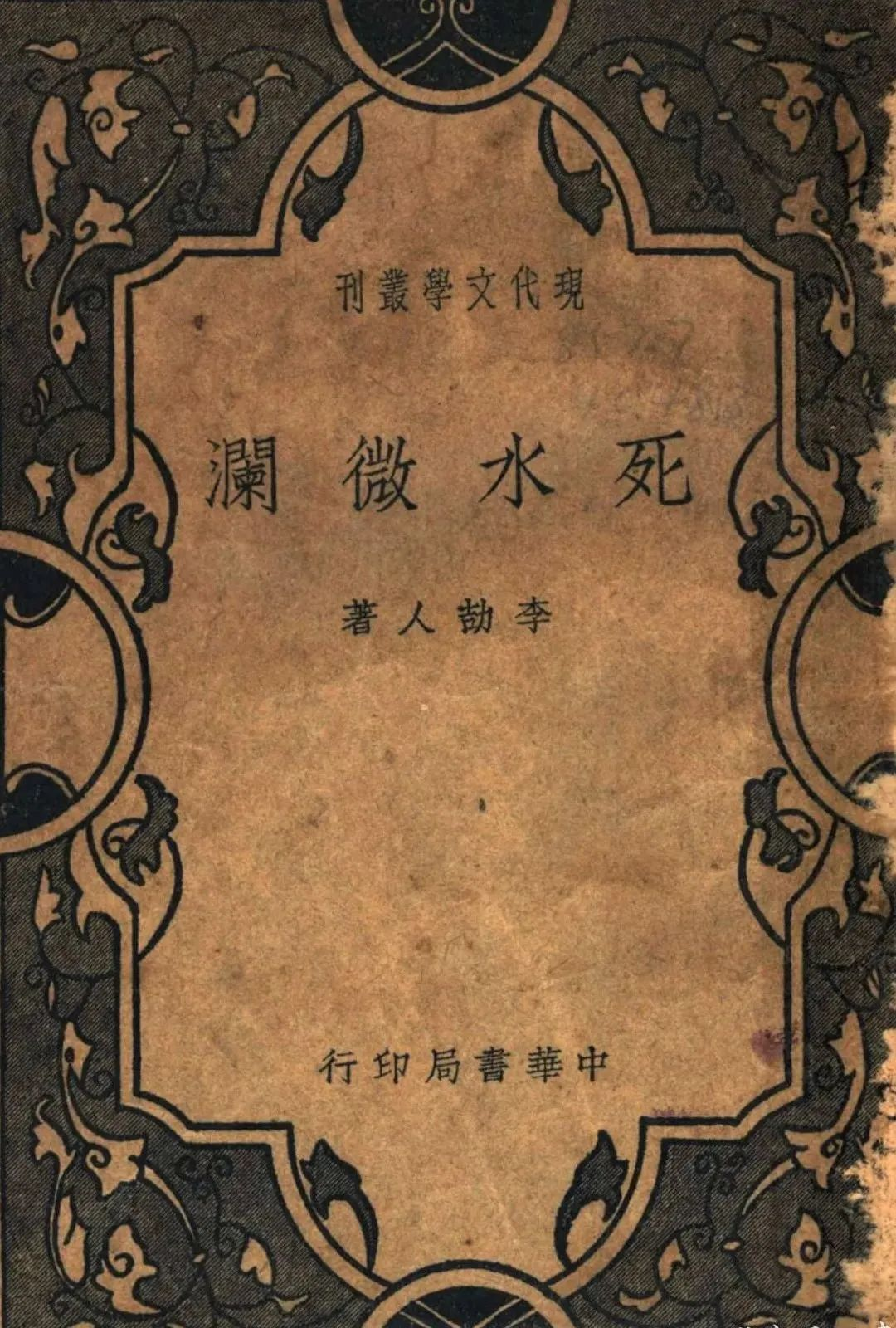
- First edition
- Author: Li Jieren
- Language: Chinese
- Genre: Naturalism
- Set in: Sichuan
- Publisher: Chunghwa Publishing
- Publication date: 1935
- Publication place: Republican China
- English publication date: 1990, 2013
- Media type: Paperback
- Pages: 282
- OCLC: 28924130
- Followed by: Before the Storm

Ripple on Stagnant Water
- Traditional Chinese: 死水微瀾
- Simplified Chinese: 死水微澜
Transcriptions
Standard Mandarin
- Hanyu Pinyin: Sǐshuǐ Wēi lán
- Wade–Giles: Ssu3-shui3 Wei1 lan2

Ripple on Stagnant Water (traditional Chinese: 死水微瀾; simplified Chinese: 死水微澜), also translated as Ripples Across Stagnant Water, and Ripples on Dead Water, is a novel by Li Jieren. It was first published in 1935. An updated version appeared in 1955.

== Plot ==
The work follows the married and romantic life of Deng Yaogu (Note: traditional Chinese: 鄧幺姑; simplified Chinese: 邓幺姑; pinyin: Dèng Yāogū; Wade–Giles: Teng⁴ Yao¹-ku¹), a resident of the town of Tianhui (Note: 天回鎮; 天回镇; Tiānhuí zhèn; Ti'en¹-hui² chen⁴, called Tianhui in the Panda Books translation and "Heaven's Turn" in the Bret Starling/Yin Chi translation.) along with her husband, Cai Xingshun (Note: 蔡興順; 蔡兴顺; Cài Xīngshùn; Ts'ai⁴ Hsing¹-shun⁴). She wants to change the circumstances of her live relocate to Chengdu. She is involved in two affairs and divorces Cai between the first and second. The first is with her cousin, Cambuel Luo (Note: 羅歪嘴; 罗歪嘴; Luó Wāizuǐ; Lo² Wai¹-tsui³; 'Twisted Mouth Luo': The character's English name is "Cambuel Luo" in the translation by Bret Starling and Yin Chi and "Skewmouth Luo" in the Panda Books translation. "Cam beul" means "curved mouth" in Gaelic.), who is in a secretive organization known as Elder Brothers Society. The second is with Gu Tiancheng (Note: 顧天成; 顾天成; Gù Tiānchéng; Ku T'ien¹-ch'eng²), a Christian from Chengdu whom she marries.

By describing the lives of commoners, the novel reveals a complex balance of power among the local Christian communities, Elder Brothers Society and the bureaucracy, during the last decade of the 19th century.

According to Yuehtsen Juliette Chung (Note: 鐘月岑; 钟月岑; Zhōng Yuècén; Chung¹ Yüeh⁴-ts'en²) of National Tsing-Hua University, Cambuel Luo and Gu Tiancheng represent both a city-country tension.

== Versions ==
The 1955 version was published by Zuojia Chubanshe. C. T. Hsia stated that according to Li Jieren's statements in the postscript, the 1955 version had "slight" changes.

=== Translations ===
An earlier English translation was marketed by Panda Books in 1990, as Ripples Across Stagnant Water. This translation was published in China by the Chinese Literature Press.

An English translation by Bret Starling and Yin Chi (Note: 殷馳; 殷驰; Yīn Chí), titled Ripple on Stagnant Water: A Novel of Sichuan in the Age of Treaty Ports, was published by University of Hawaii Press in 2013. In this version, the appendix houses the novel's prologue. This version is distributed in Canada by University of British Columbia Press. The basis of the Starling/Chi translation is the Chinese version published in 1935.

Kristin Eileen Stapleton (Note: 司崑崙; 司昆仑; Sī Kūnlún; Ssu¹ K'un¹-lun²) of the University of Buffalo stated that in the Starling/Chi version, the Sichuanese dialect speech in the original novel was translated into "what I gather is a sort of Scottish brogue".

== Adaptation ==
There is a 1988 television adaptation, titled in English as A Woman to Three Men, but with the same Chinese title as the original novel.

There is also a 1992 British Hong Kong-China film, titled in English as Ripples Across Stagnant Water, with the Chinese name being "狂" (kuáng).

== See also ==
- The Lost Geopoetic Horizon of Li Jieren, which has a chapter discussing the work

== Notes ==
Names in native languages:
