= Christianity in Sichuan =

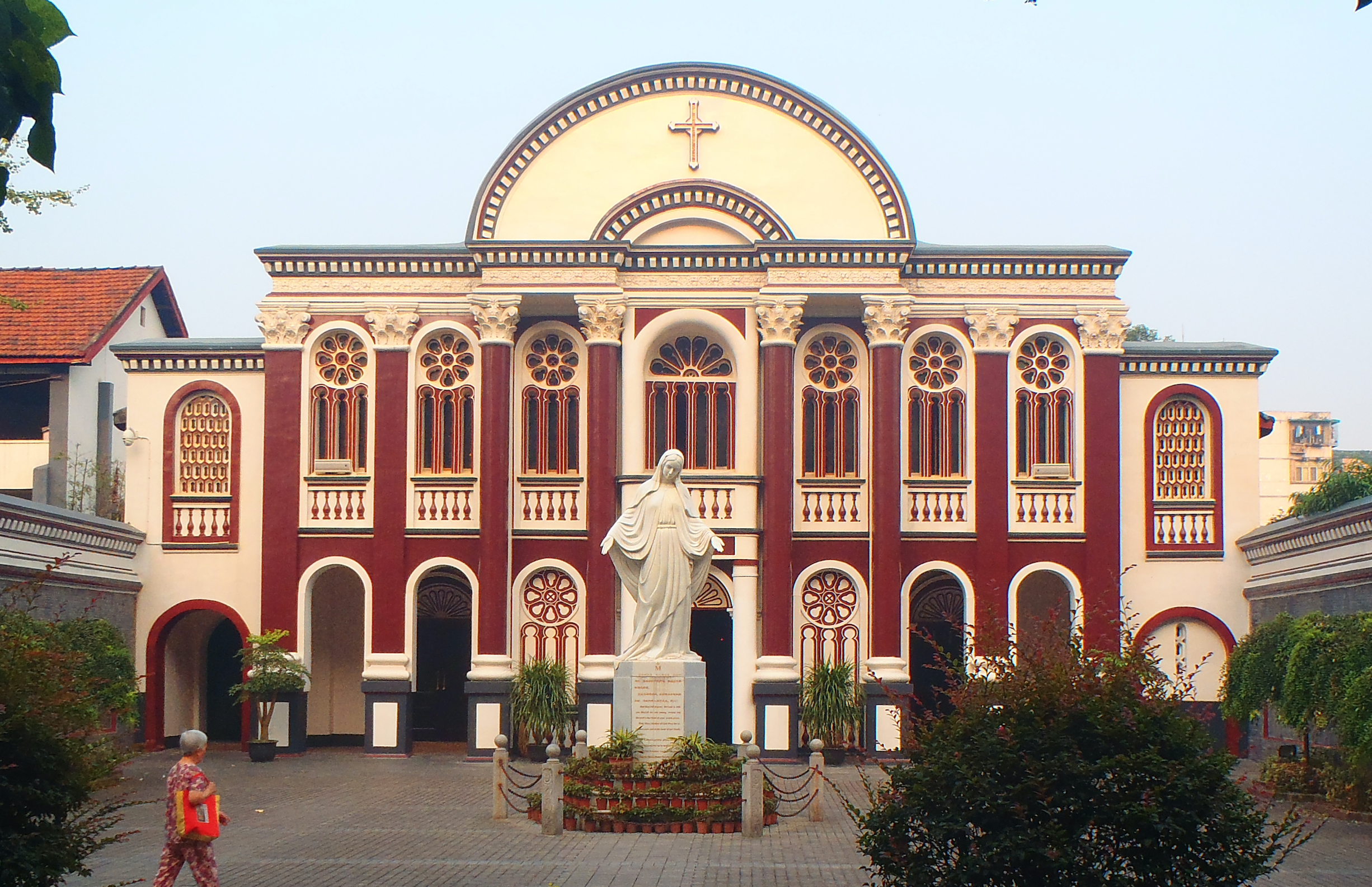
Immaculate Conception Cathedral, Chengdu (Catholic)

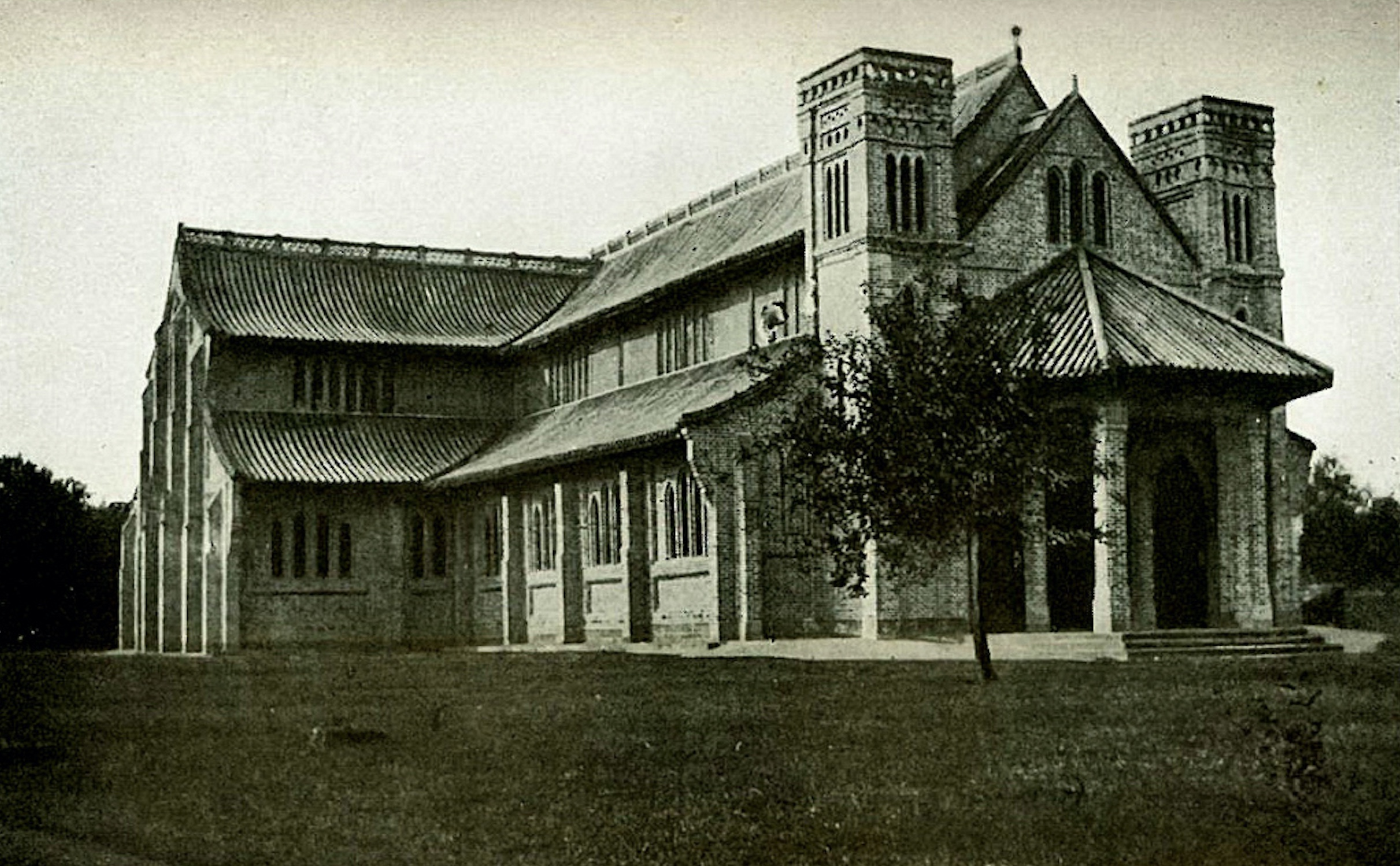
St John's Cathedral, Langzhong (Anglican)

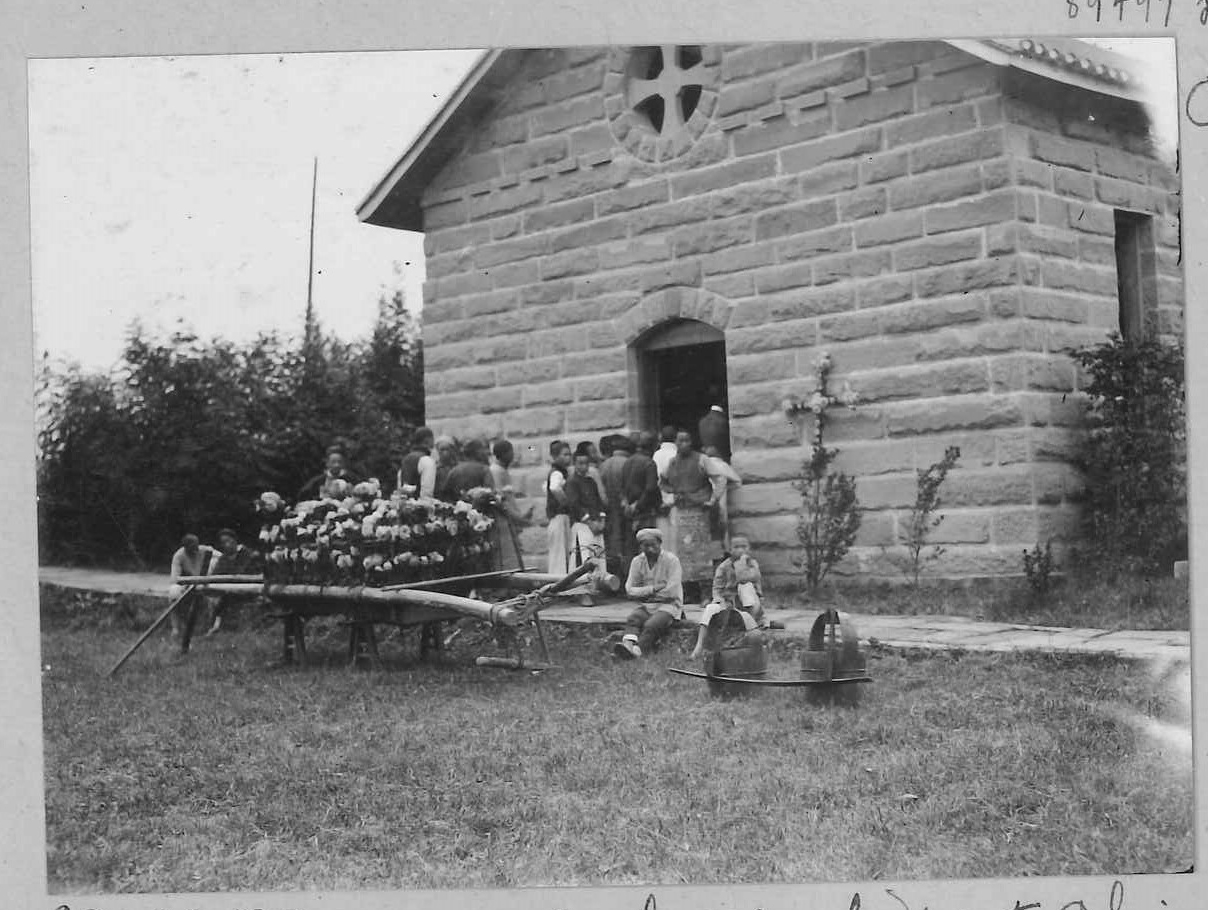
American Methodist Episcopal church, Chongqing (Methodist)

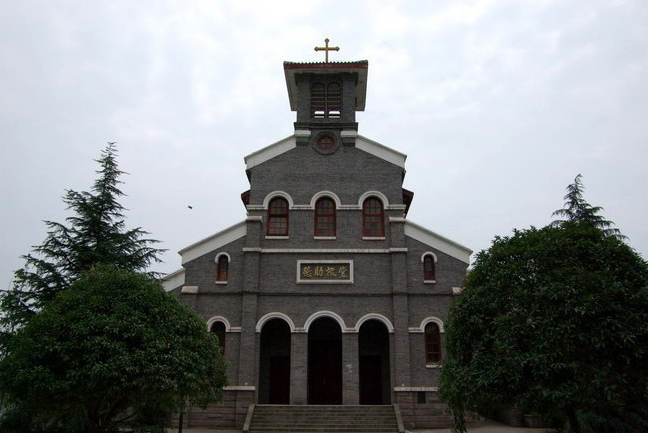
St. Thérèse of Lisieux Church, Chongqing (Catholic)

Monochrome pictures indicate the denomination having been merged into government-controlled "Three-Self Church".

Christianity is a minority religion in the southwestern Chinese province of Sichuan. (Note: Formerly romanized as Szechwan or Szechuan; also referred to as "West China" or "Western China".)

== History ==
=== East Syriac Christianity ===
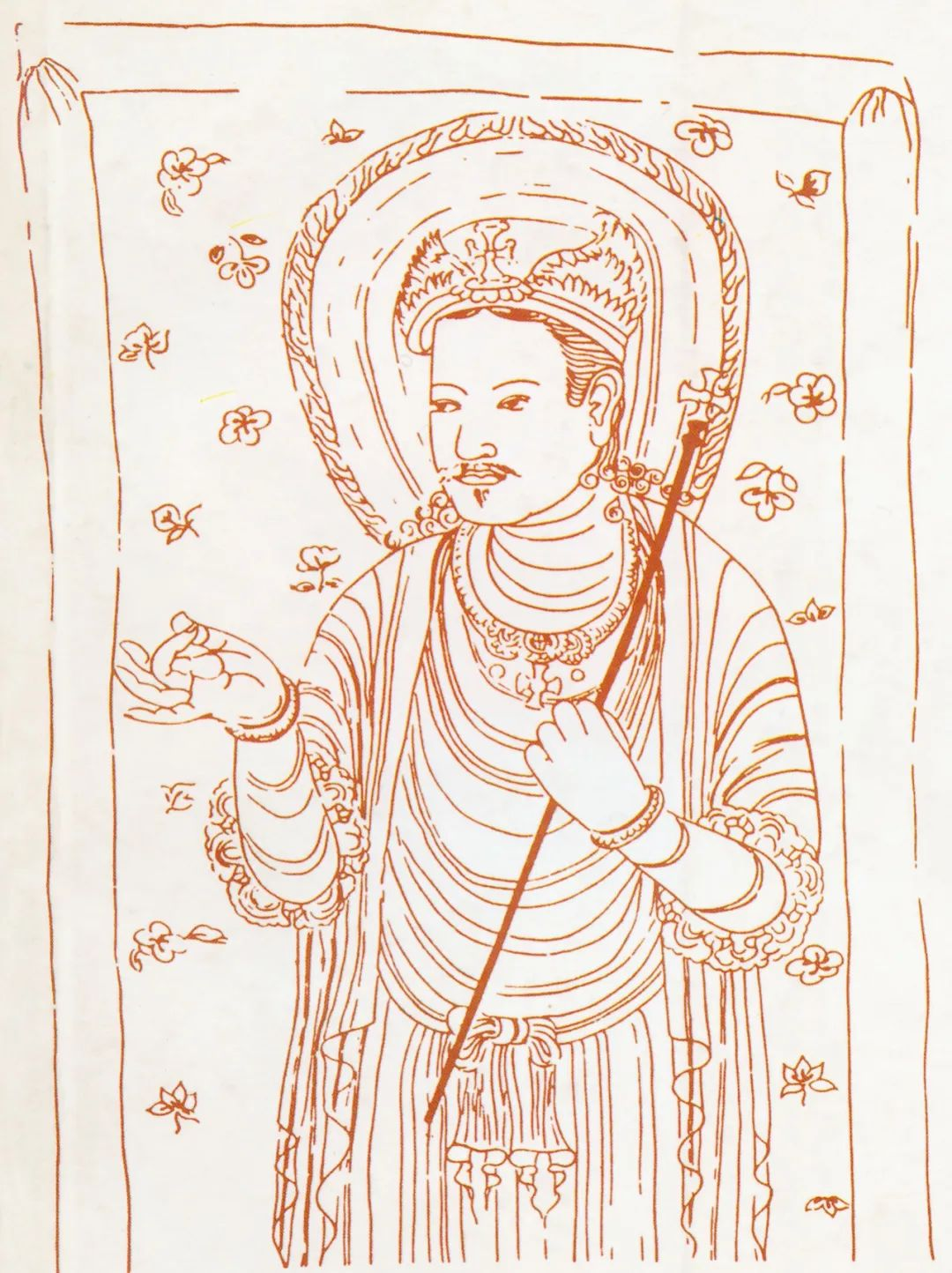
East Syriac Christian figure representing Jesus Christ or a saint

A presence of the East Syriac Christianity can be confirmed in Chengdu during the Tang dynasty (618–907), and two monasteries have been located in Chengdu and Mount Omei. A report by the 9th-century writer Li Deyu included in A Complete Collection of Tang-era Prose Literature states that a certain Daqin cleric proficient in ophthalmology was present in the Chengdu area.

According to the 12th-century biji collection Loose Records from the Studio of Possible Change by Wu Zeng, during the Tang dynasty, "Hu" missionaries built a Daqin temple (i.e., an East Syriac church) into the existing ruins of the former Castle of Seven Treasures (Note: Castle of Seven Treasures (traditional Chinese: 七寶樓; simplified Chinese: 七宝楼; pinyin: Qībǎo lóu; Sichuanese romanization: Ts'ie^{5} Pao^{3} Leo^{2})) at Chengdu, which was constructed by ancient Shu kings of the Kaiming dynasty (666 BC – 316 BC), with pearl curtains installed as decorative applications. It was later destroyed by the Great Fire of Shu Commandery during the reign of Emperor Wu of Han (141 BC – 87 BC). The temple consisted of a gatehouse, halls and towers, just like the former castle, its doors were decorated with curtains made of gold, pearls and green jasper, hence known as the Pearl Temple. (Note: Pearl Temple (traditional Chinese: 珍珠樓; simplified Chinese: 珍珠楼; archaic form: 眞珠樓 or 真珠樓; pinyin: Zhēnzhū lóu; Sichuanese romanization: Chen^{1} Chu^{1} Leo^{2}))

According to a local tradition in Guanghan (Hanchow, lit. 'Han Prefecture'), its 8th-century prefect Fang Guan (Fang Kuan) was an East Syriac Christian. The tradition says that he worshipped the One God alone. At his daily worship, Fang used to kneel on a stone which later came to be known as the Duke Fang Stone. According to local testimonies, his name was carved on the no-longer-extant Nestorian stele at Wangxiangtai (Wang Hsiang T'ai) Temple. The earlier name for the temple was Jingfu Yuan (Ching Fu Yuan), and Jingfu is a term with the meaning "Blessings of Christianity".

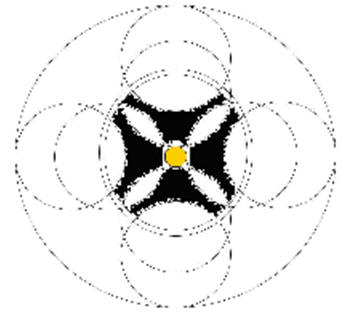
One of the Ciqikou crosses found on a street, is fundamentally identical to crosses found in Aleppo, Syria.

The name Bakos, of a priest from Chongqing, is recorded on the left side, second row, at the very top of the "Nestorian" Xi'an Stele. A pilgrim cross and several crosses of Syrian design were identified by a Syriac Orthodox priest Dale Albert Johnson in Ciqikou, Chongqing, dated to the 9th century. The pilgrim cross embedded in a stone on Ciqikou street has a simple style as the type carved by pilgrims and travelers. Of the Syrian-designed crosses, one was found on the same street as the pilgrim cross, is fundamentally identical to crosses found in Aleppo, Syria. The icon consists of a cross within a circle touching eight points. Two points on each end of the four ends of the cross touch the inner arch of the circle. Each arm of the cross is narrower near the middle than at the ends. The center of the cross draws to a circle at the center. The rest are crosses within Bodhi leaves carved on a round granite stone base sitting in front of a curio shop on a side street in Ciqikou. According to Johnson, crosses within Bodhi leaves (heart shape or spade designs) are identified as Persian crosses associated with the Syrian Christians of India.

According to David Crockett Graham, Marco Polo found East Syriac monasteries which still existed in Sichuan and Yunnan during the 13th century.

=== Roman Catholicism ===
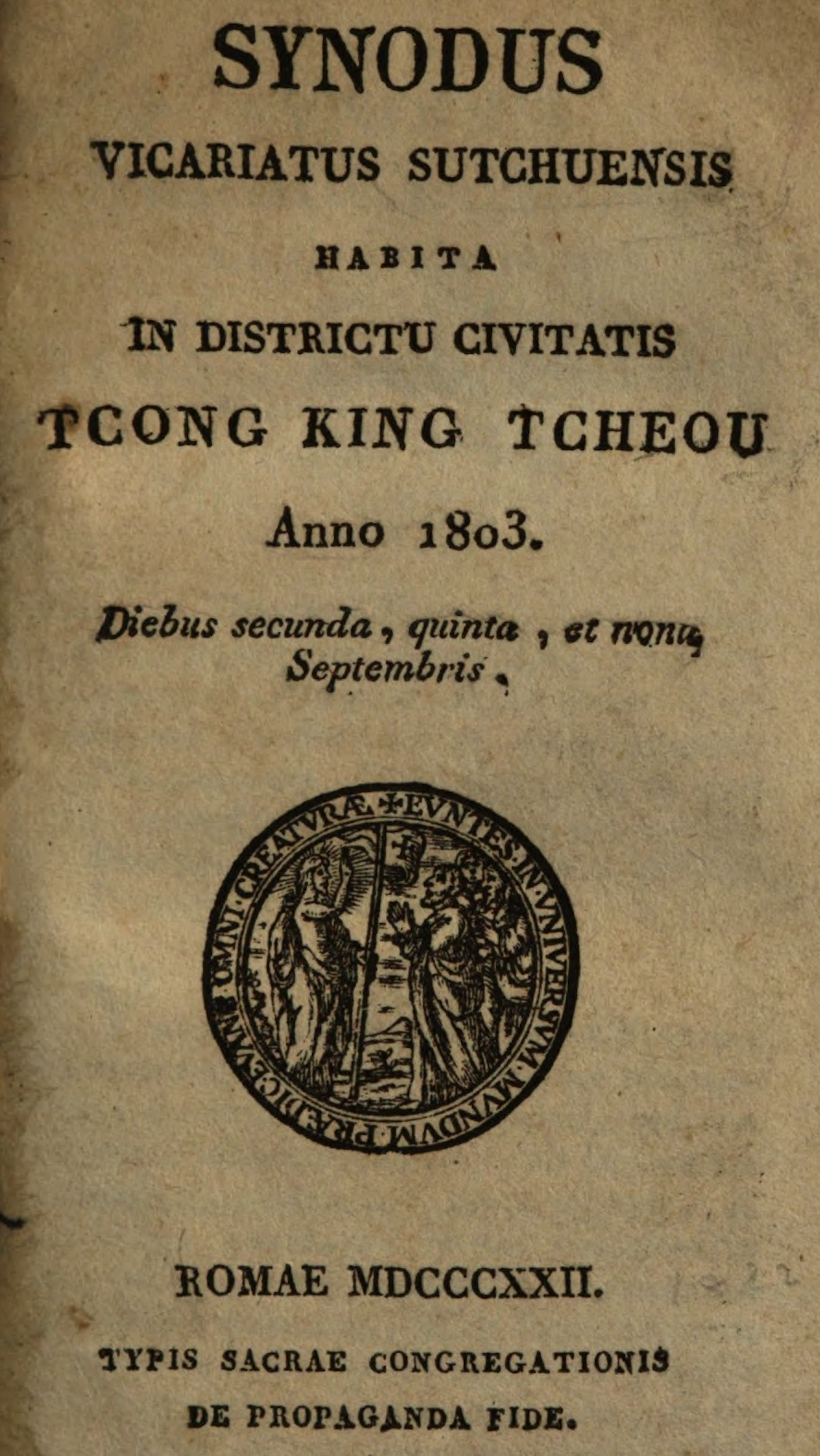
Synodus Vicariatus Sutchuensis, published in Rome in 1822. The Synod of Sichuan was the first Catholic synod held in China.

The first Roman Catholic mission in Sichuan was carried out by the Jesuits Lodovico Buglio and Gabriel de Magalhães, during the 1640s. After the massacre of Sichuan by Zhang Xianzhong, a search for surviving Christians was carried out by Basil Xu, the then intendant of Eastern Sichuan Circuit, and his mother Candida Xu, who were both Catholics. They found a considerable number of converts in Baoning, Candida then invited the priest Claudius Motel to serve the congregation. Several churches were built in Chengdu, Baoning and Chongqing under the supervision of Motel.

Coat of arms of the Diocese of Chengdu.

The predecessor of the Diocese of Chengdu—the Apostolic Vicariate of Setchuen (Sichuan)—was established on 15 October 1696, and Artus de Lionne, a French missionary, was the first apostolic vicar. In 1753, the Paris Foreign Missions Society took over responsibility for Catholic mission in Sichuan. In 1803, the first synod ever celebrated in China took place in Chongqingzhou, convened by Gabriel-Taurin Dufresse. By 1804, the Sichuanese Catholic community included four French missionaries and eighteen local priests. By 1870, the Church in Sichuan had 80,000 faithful, which was the largest number of Catholics in the entire country.

On 27 March 1846, part of the western territory of the Apostolic Vicariate of Setchuen was split off to form the Apostolic Vicariate of Lhasa, which marked the beginning of the Paris Foreign Missions Society's Tibetan Mission.

The first group of Spanish Redemptorists left for China in February 1928: Segundo Miguel Rodríguez, José Morán Pan and Segundo Velasco Arina. They were active in the Apostolic Vicariate of Chengtu and the Apostolic Vicariate of Ningyuanfu in Xichang,^{:15} and had a house and chapel built in Chengdu. The last Spanish Redemptorists were expelled from China by the Communist government in 1952.^{:15}

The Sichuan Major Seminary was established in 1984 in Chengdu. In 2000, Lucy Yi Zhenmei, a 19th-century virgin martyr from Mienchow (now Mianyang), was canonised a saint by Pope John Paul II. Today, the Catholic population of the province is estimated at 250,000 persons.

=== Protestantism ===
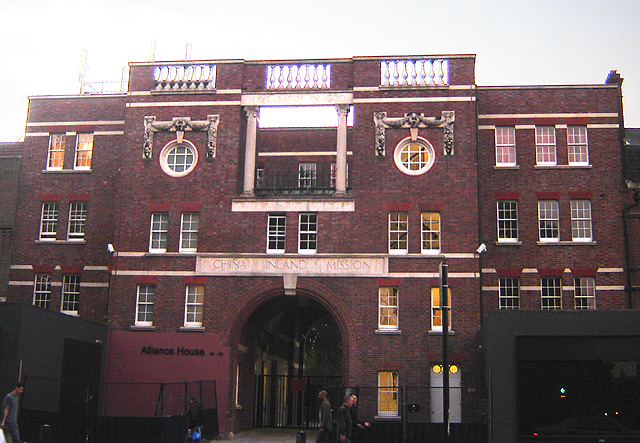
Former headquarters of China Inland Mission (CIM) at London. The CIM carried out the first Protestant mission in Sichuan, in 1877.

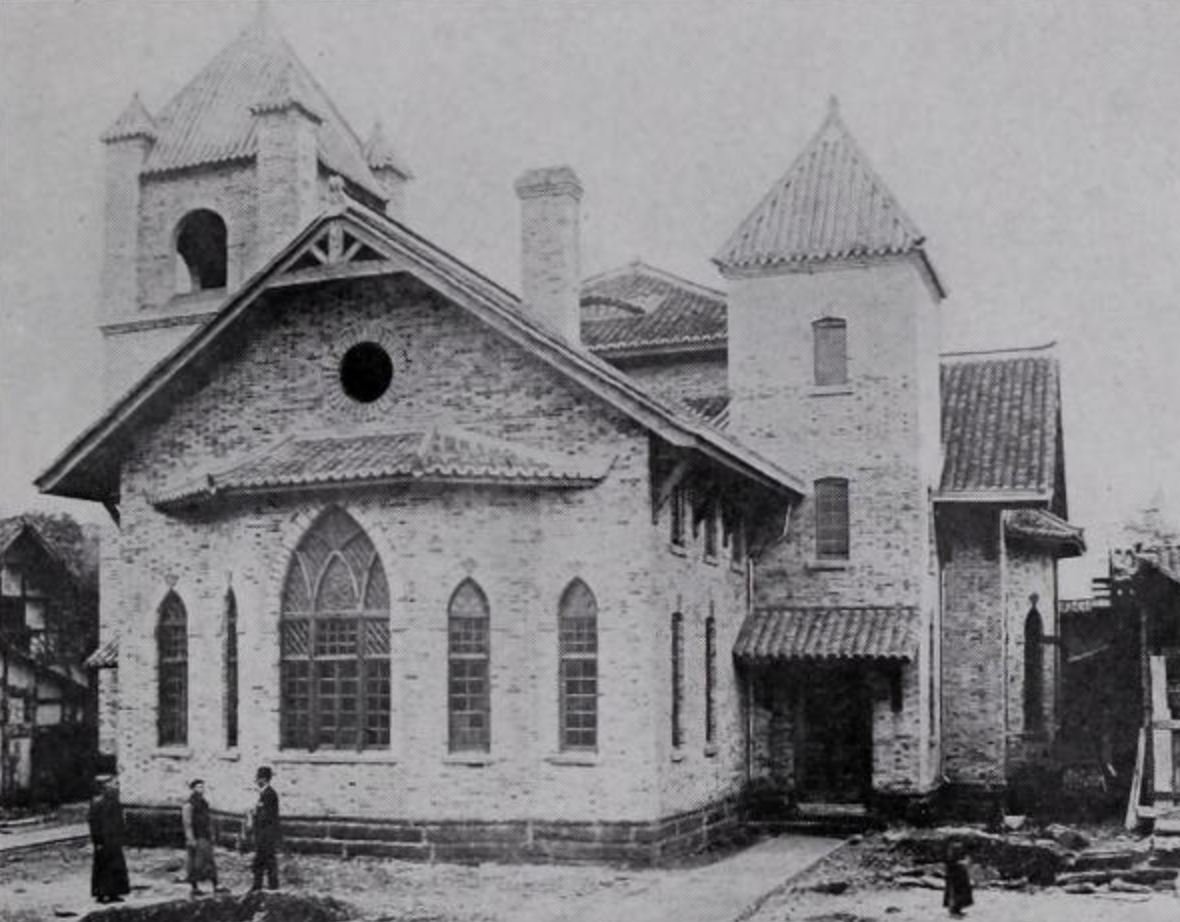
American Baptist church at Yazhou (Yachowfu)

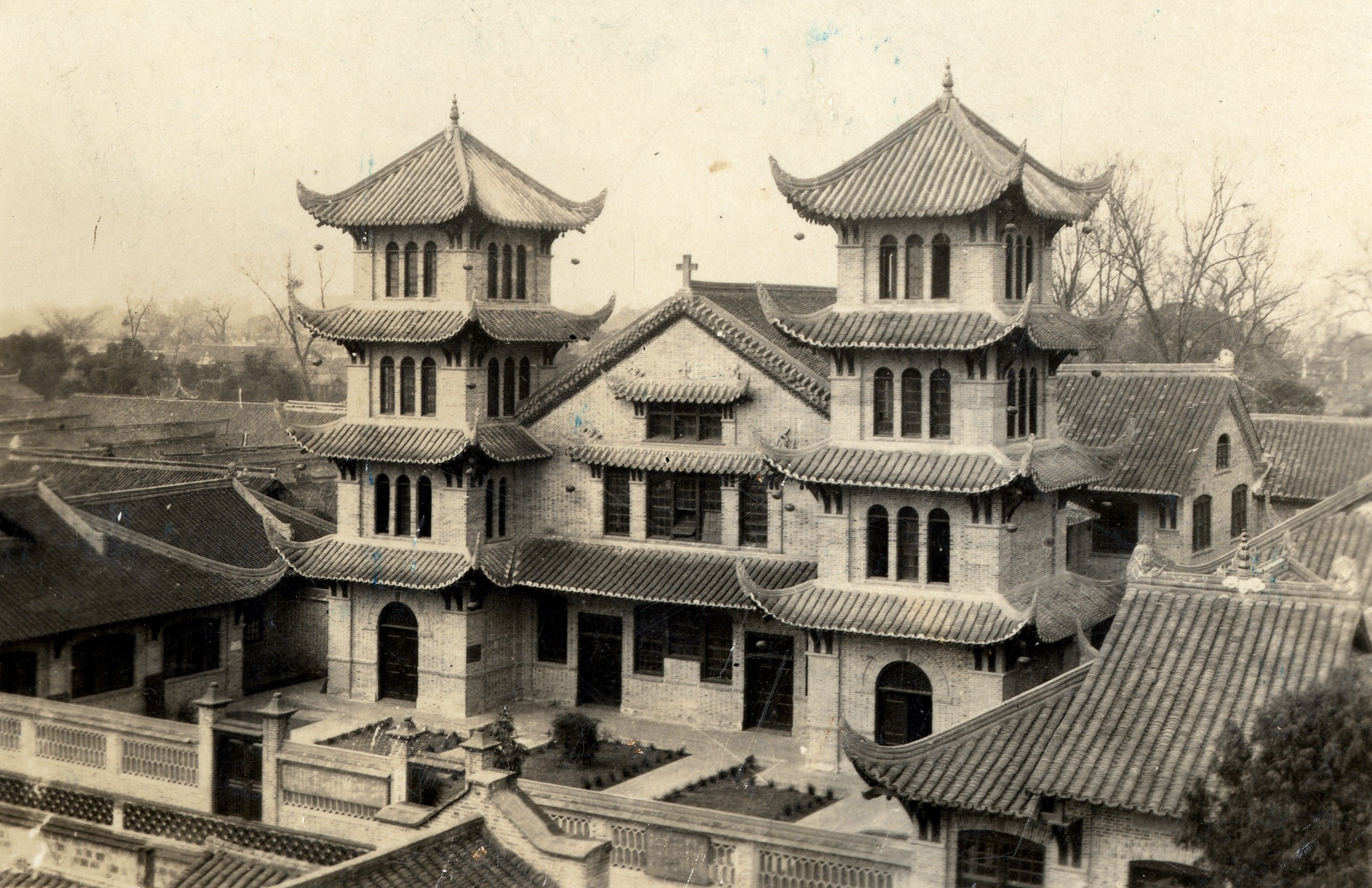
American Methodist Episcopal church at Chengdu (Chengtu)

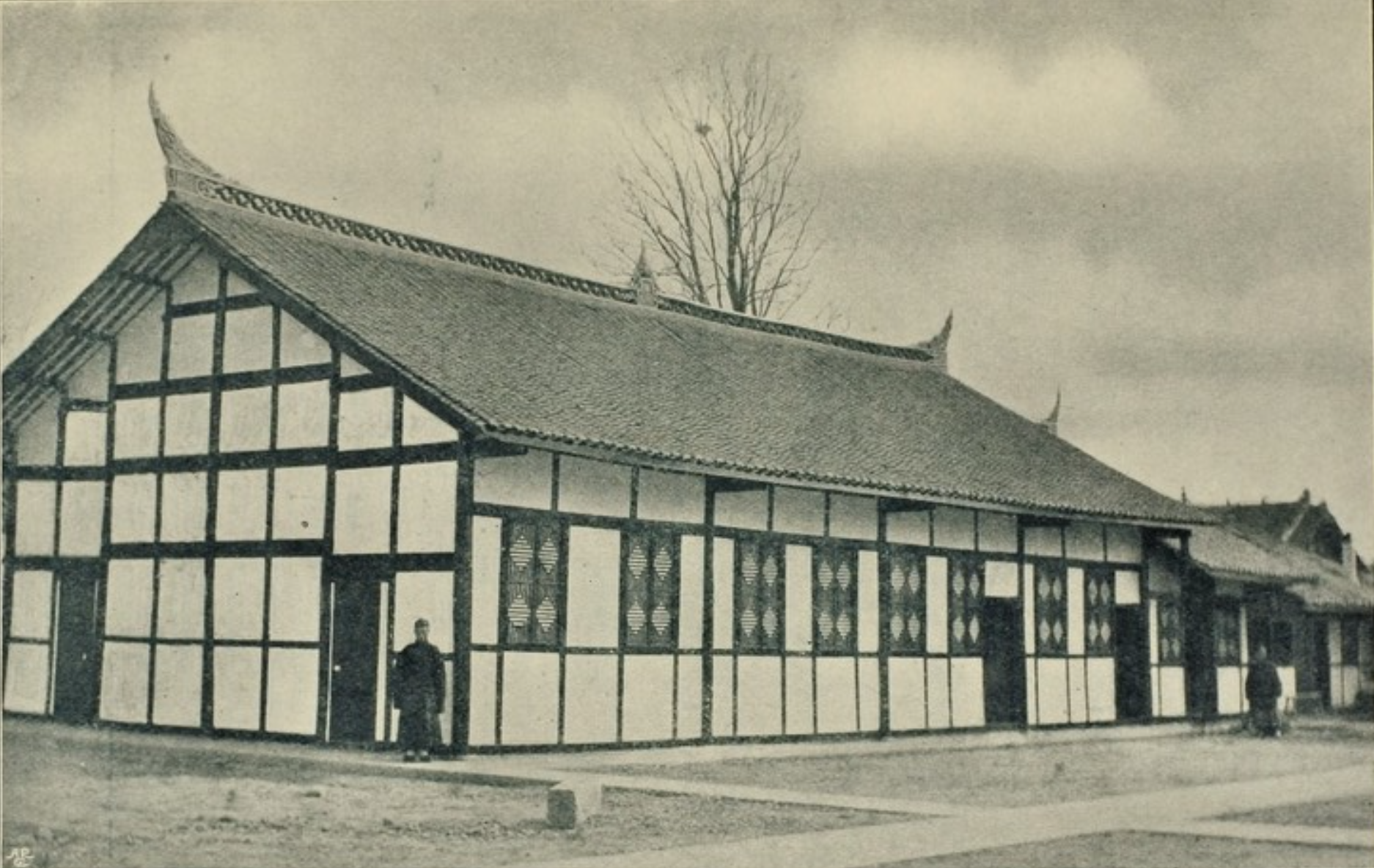
English Quaker meeting house at Tongchuan (Tungchwan)

In 1868, Griffith John of the London Missionary Society and Alexander Wylie of the British and Foreign Bible Society entered Sichuan as the first Protestant missionaries to take up work in that province. They travelled throughout Sichuan and reported the situation along the way to the headquarters of various missionary societies in Britain and missionaries in China, which opened the door for the entry of Protestantism into Sichuan.

However, no other missionaries visited this province again until 1877, when Rev. John McCarthy of the China Inland Mission (CIM), after landing at Wanxian, travelled via Shunqing to Chongqing, where he arrived on 1 May. There he rented premises for other CIM missionaries to use as a base.

In 1882, American Methodist Episcopal missionaries arrived in Chongqing (Chungking). Their early efforts encountered strong resistance and riots that led to the abandonment of the mission. It was not until 1889 that these Methodists came back and started the mission again.

The year 1887 marks the arrival of the Anglican representatives of the CIM. William Cassels, already in holy orders; Arthur T. Polhill-Turner, was reading for orders when he volunteered for China; and Montagu Proctor-Beauchamp. All three were members of the Cambridge Seven.

In 1888, the London Missionary Society began work in Sichuan, taking Chongqing as their center, a city in the east of the province. In addition, they had a large district to the south and southeast.

The first American Baptist missionaries to reach the province were Rev. W. M. Upcraft and Rev. George Warner, who sailed in 1889. The journey required many weeks before their arrival in Suifu, where they established the first mission station. Four more stations were established in Jiading (Kiating, 1894), Yazhou (Yachow, 1894), Ningyuan (1905), and Chengdu (Chengtu, 1909).

Robert John and Mary Jane Davidson of Friends' Foreign Mission Association introduced Quakerism into Tongchuan (Tungchwan) in 1889. Within 19 years five monthly meetings were successively established in Chengdu, Chongqing, Tongchuan, Tongliang (Tungliang) and Suining.

At the close of 1891, the Rev. James Heywood Horsburgh, along with Mrs. Horsburgh, Rev. O. M. Jackson, three laymen, and six single women missionaries, entered Sichuan as the first band of Church Missionary Society (CMS) missionaries to take up work in that province. By 1894, CMS work had started in Mianzhou (Mienchow), Zhongba (Chungpa), Anhsien, Mianzhu (Mienchu) and Xindu (Sintu). Their first church was founded in 1894 in Zhongba.

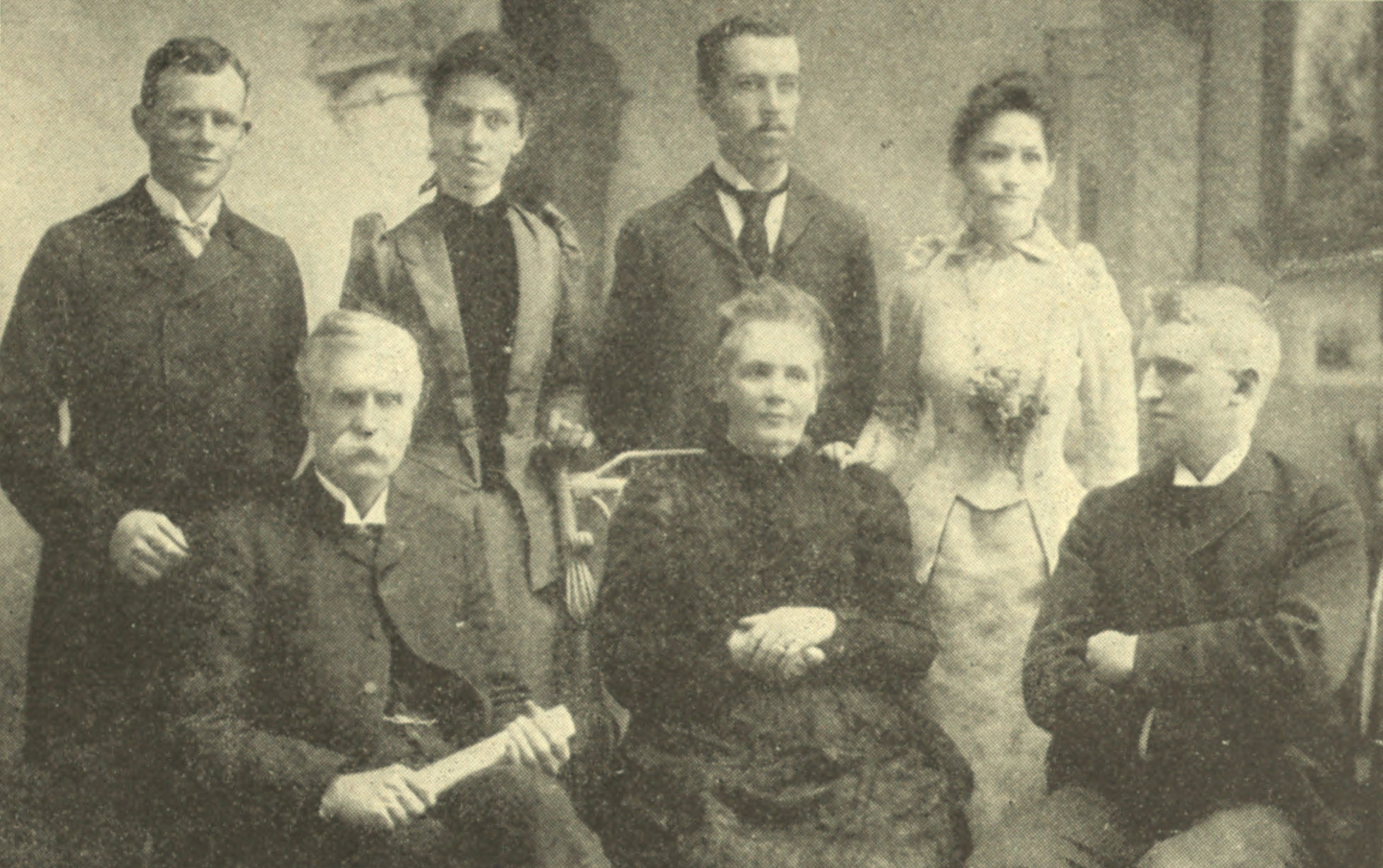
First Canadian Methodist missionaries to Sichuan, 1891.

In 1892, the Canadian Methodist Mission established missionary stations in Chengdu and Leshan. A church and a hospital were subsequently built in Jinjiang District, Chengdu, which was the result of a team effort by O. L. Kilborn, V. C. Hart, G. E. Hartwell, D. W. Stevenson and others. In 1910, the Canadian Mission took over Chongqing district from London Missionary Society.

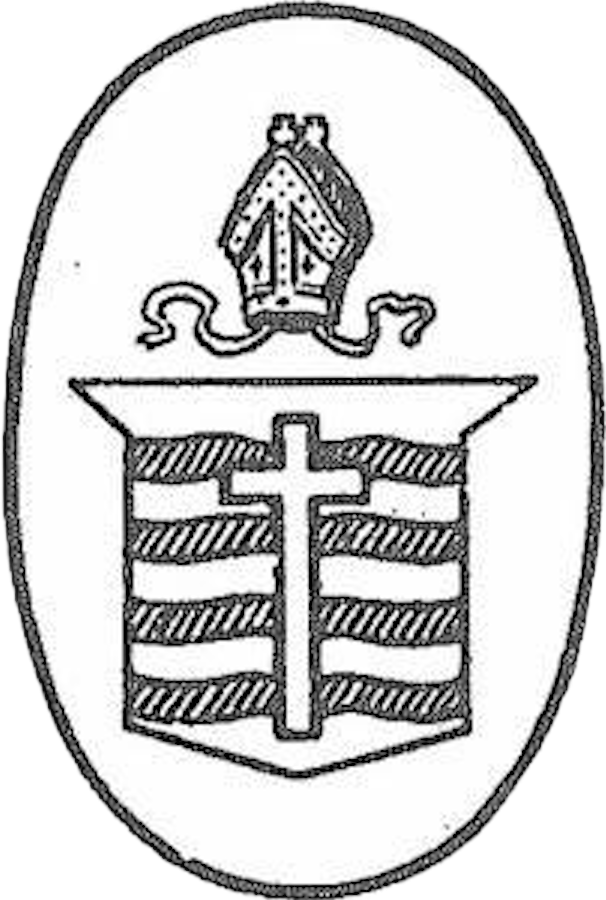
Seal of the Anglican Diocese of Szechwan.

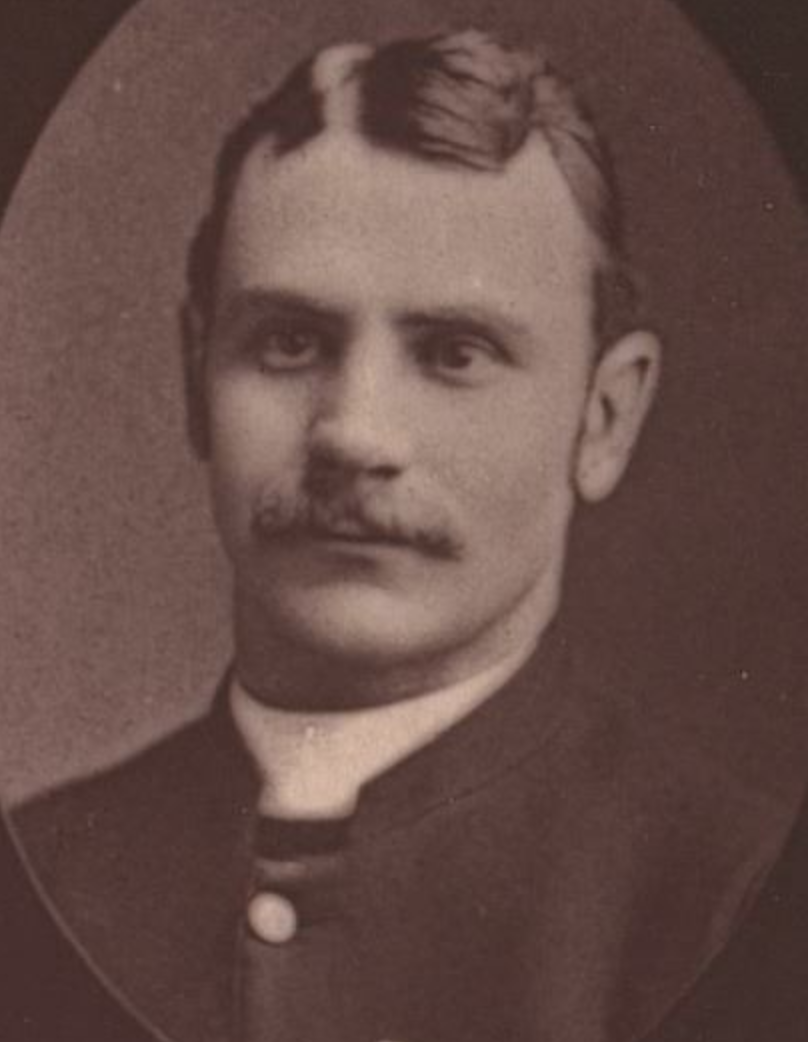
William Cassels, first bishop of the Anglican Diocese of Szechwan.

The Anglican Diocese of Szechwan was established in 1895, under the supervision of the Church of England. The foundation of the diocese was the result from the efforts of William Cassels, Arthur T. Polhill-Turner and Montagu Proctor-Beauchamp. Cassels was consecrated as the first diocesan bishop in Westminster Abbey, in the same year.

In 1897, Cecil Polhill, also one of the Cambridge Seven, along with other four China Inland Mission missionaries, they established a missionary station in Dajianlu (Tatsienlu), Sichuanese Tibet, which paved the way for the future construction of the Gospel Church.

The West China Union University was launched in 1910, in Chengdu. It was the product of a collective effort of four Protestant missionary boards: American Baptist Foreign Mission Society (American Baptist Churches USA), American Methodist Episcopal Mission (Methodist Episcopal Church), Friends' Foreign Mission Association (British Quakers) and Canadian Methodist Mission (Methodist Church of Canada). The Church Missionary Society (Church of England) became a partner in the university in 1918.

In 1914, the Adventist Mission established a mission station in Chongqing. Their Sichuan Mission was officially formed in 1917. In 1919, the mission was divided into East Sichuan Mission and West Sichuan Mission for easier administration. The extreme west region was designated the Tibetan Mission headquartered at Tachienlu.

By 1922, the Foreign Christian Missionary Society had its center at the Tibetan county of Bathang. Due to the constitution of Sichuan at the time, Bathang fell outside the western boundary and belonged to the special territory of Xikang (Chwanpien).

Lutheranism also had a small presence in Chongqing, which was part of east Sichuan. The Lutheran Holy Cross Church was founded in Wan County in 1925, under the supervision of George Oliver Lillegard, a pastor-missionary sent by the Lutheran Church – Missouri Synod.

In 1940, the Church of Christ in China established the first mission station in Lifan, a county lying in the Sichuan-Khams Tibetan border region, as part of their Border Service Movement. This movement had a marked character of Social Gospel, with the aim of spreading Christianity to the Tibetan, Qiang and Yi peoples.

In 1950 it was estimated there were more than 50,000 Protestants in Sichuan, meeting in hundreds of churches and chapels. Today, the number of Protestants exceeds 200,000—many Christians reside in rural areas. Panzhihua was an area of rapid growth of Christianity in around 2000. A Sichuan Theological College exists.

== Current situation ==
After the communist takeover of China in 1949, Protestant churches in the country were forced to sever their ties with respective overseas churches, which has thus led to the merging of all the denominations into the communist-sanctioned Three-Self Patriotic Church.

As for the Catholic Church in China, all legal worship has to be conducted in government-approved churches belonging to the Catholic Patriotic Association, which does not accept the primacy of the Roman pontiff.

Some missionaries were arrested and sent to "thought reform centers" in which they underwent disturbing re-education process in a vindictive prison setting.

On 20 June 2009, the police in Langzhong set free 18 house church leaders arrested on 9 June.

In 2018, Wang Yi, a well-known pastor from Chengdu and founder of the Early Rain Covenant Church, along with 100 Christians, was detained by authorities. Wang was reportedly arrested on allegations of "inciting subversion of state power". That same year, four Christian churches in Sichuan were given an ultimatum and told they must join the Three-Self Church or be shut down.

In 2019, 200 congregants in Chengdu began to meet in secret after their state-registered Three-Self church had been shut down.

On 14 August 2022, police in Chengdu raided a Sunday gathering of the Early Rain Covenant Church and detained a leader.

=== Eastern Orthodoxy ===
A tiny Eastern Orthodox community in Chengdu is supported by the United States-based Orthodox Christian Mission Center. In 2019, Pravoslavie reported on a convert to Russian Orthodoxy, also from Chengdu.

== Maps ==
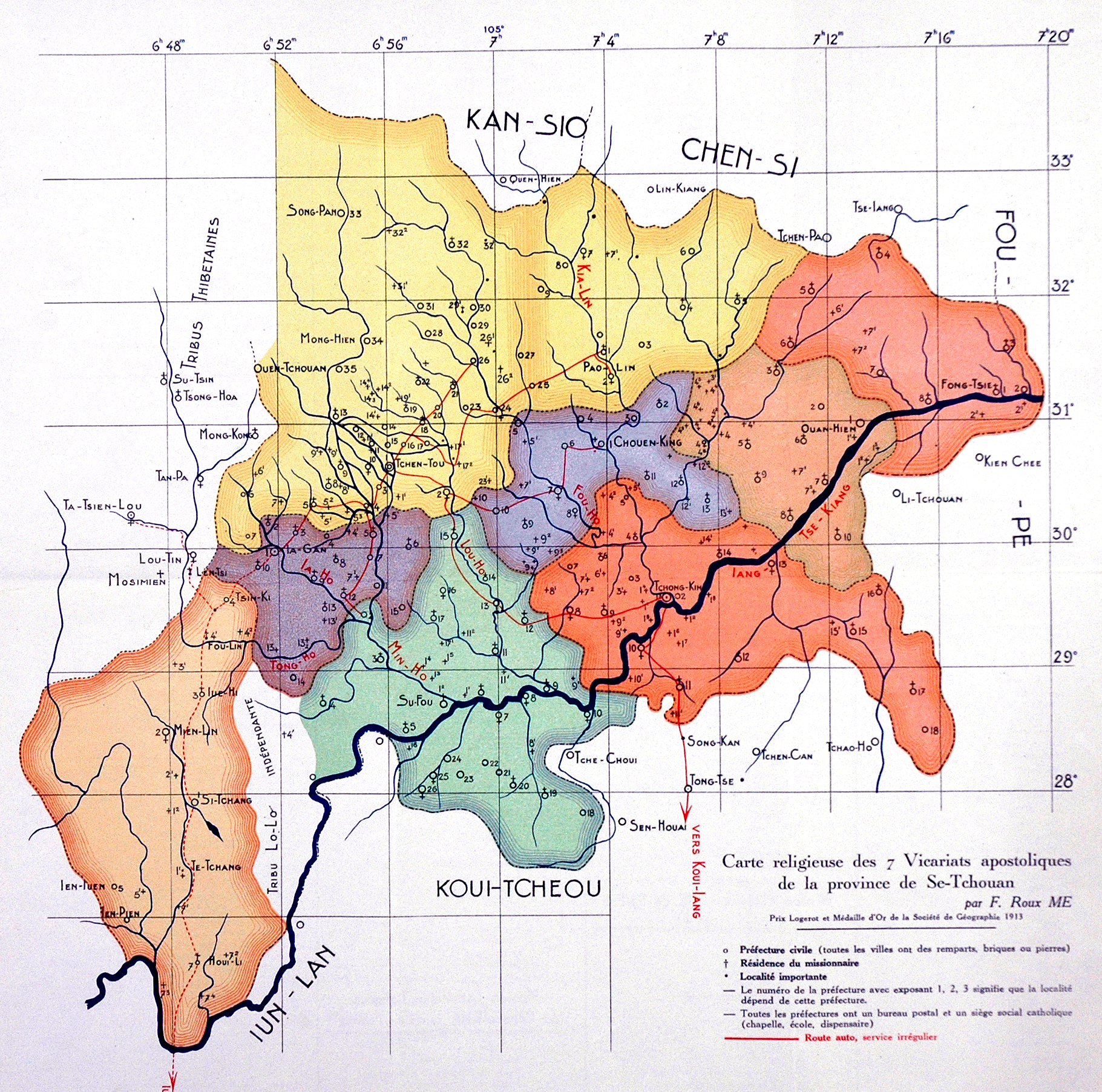
Seven apostolic vicariates of Sichuan (Catholic)

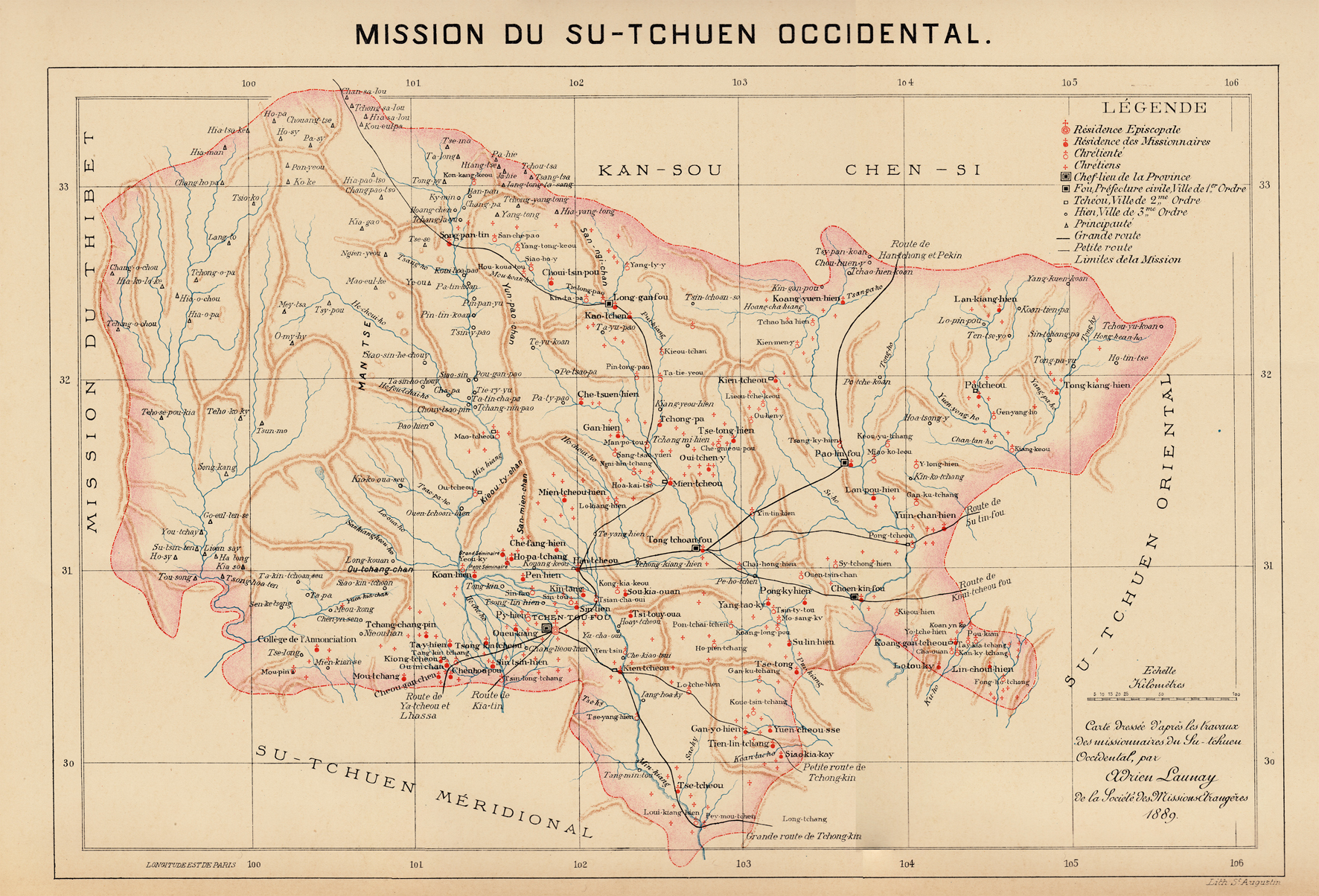
MEP Western Szechwan mission (Catholic)

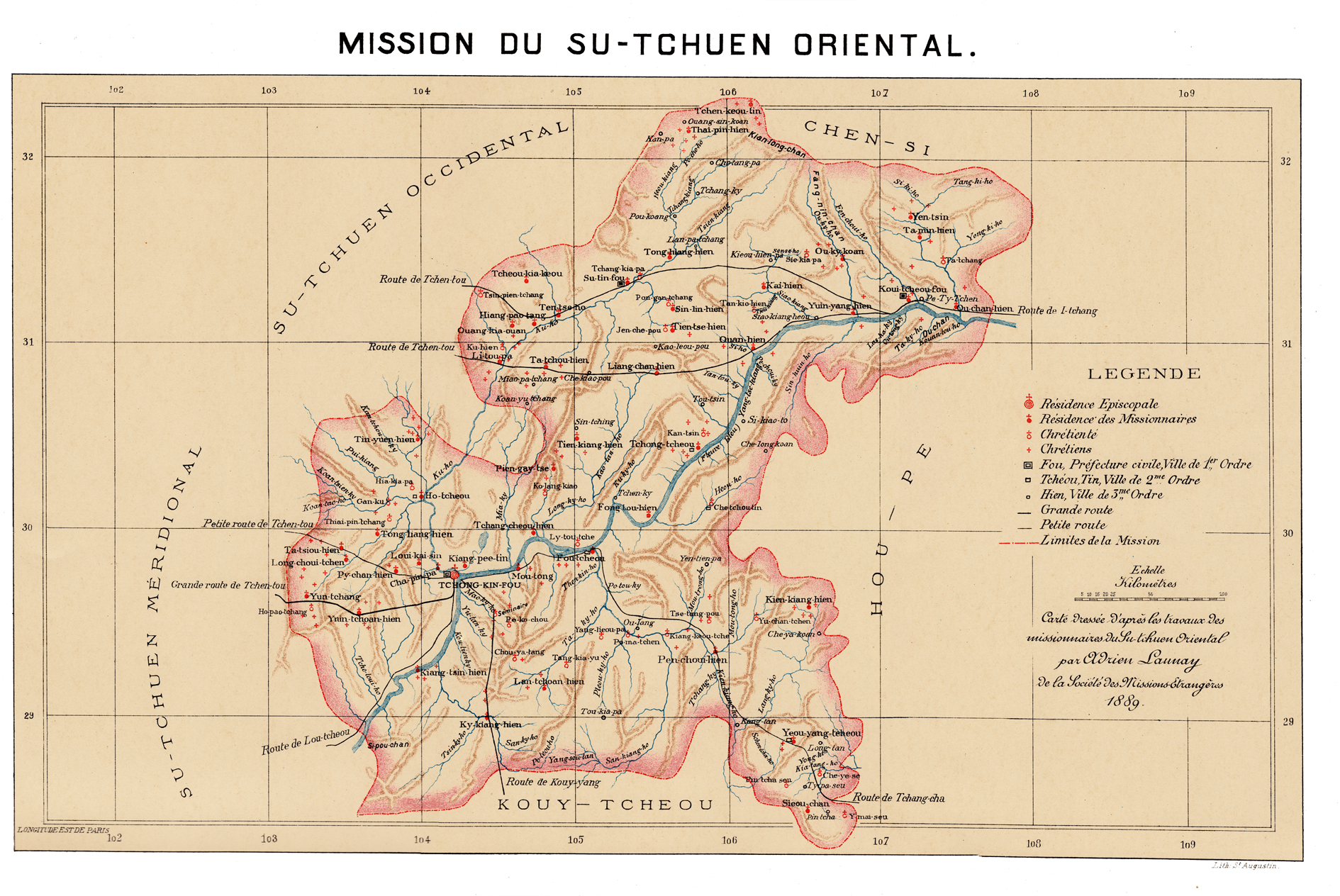
MEP Eastern Szechwan mission (Catholic)

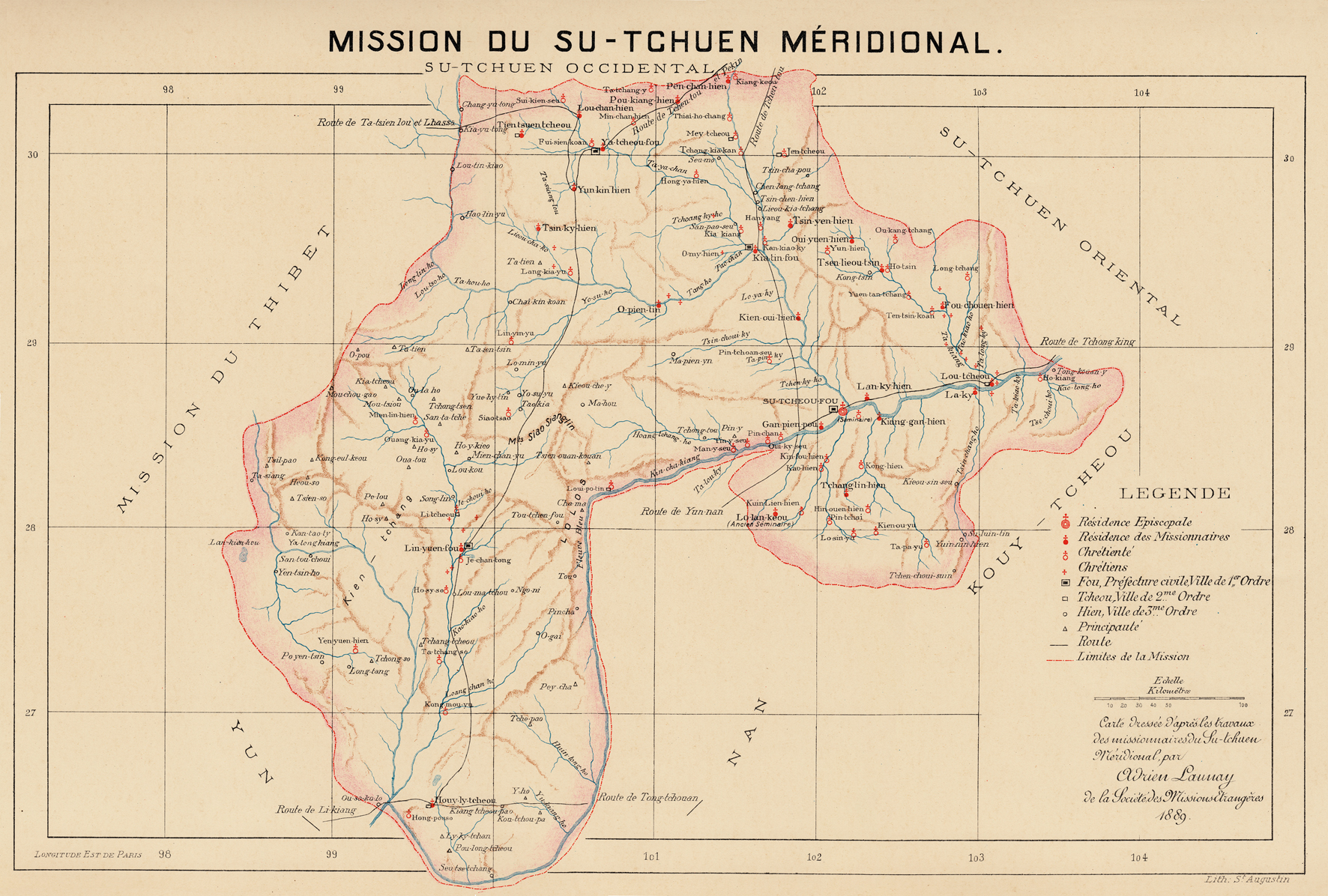
MEP Southern Szechwan mission (Catholic)

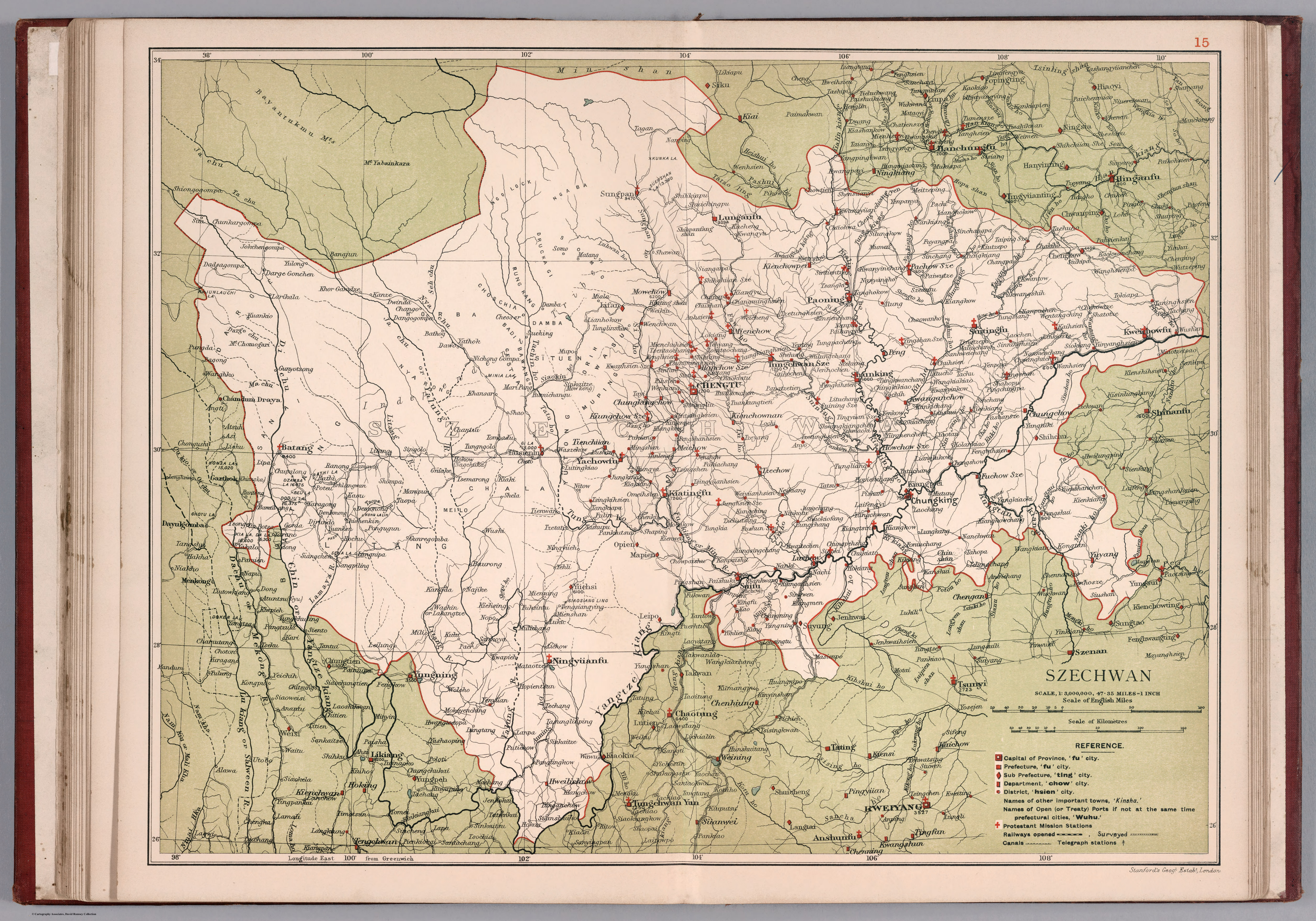
China Inland Mission (Anglican and free church)

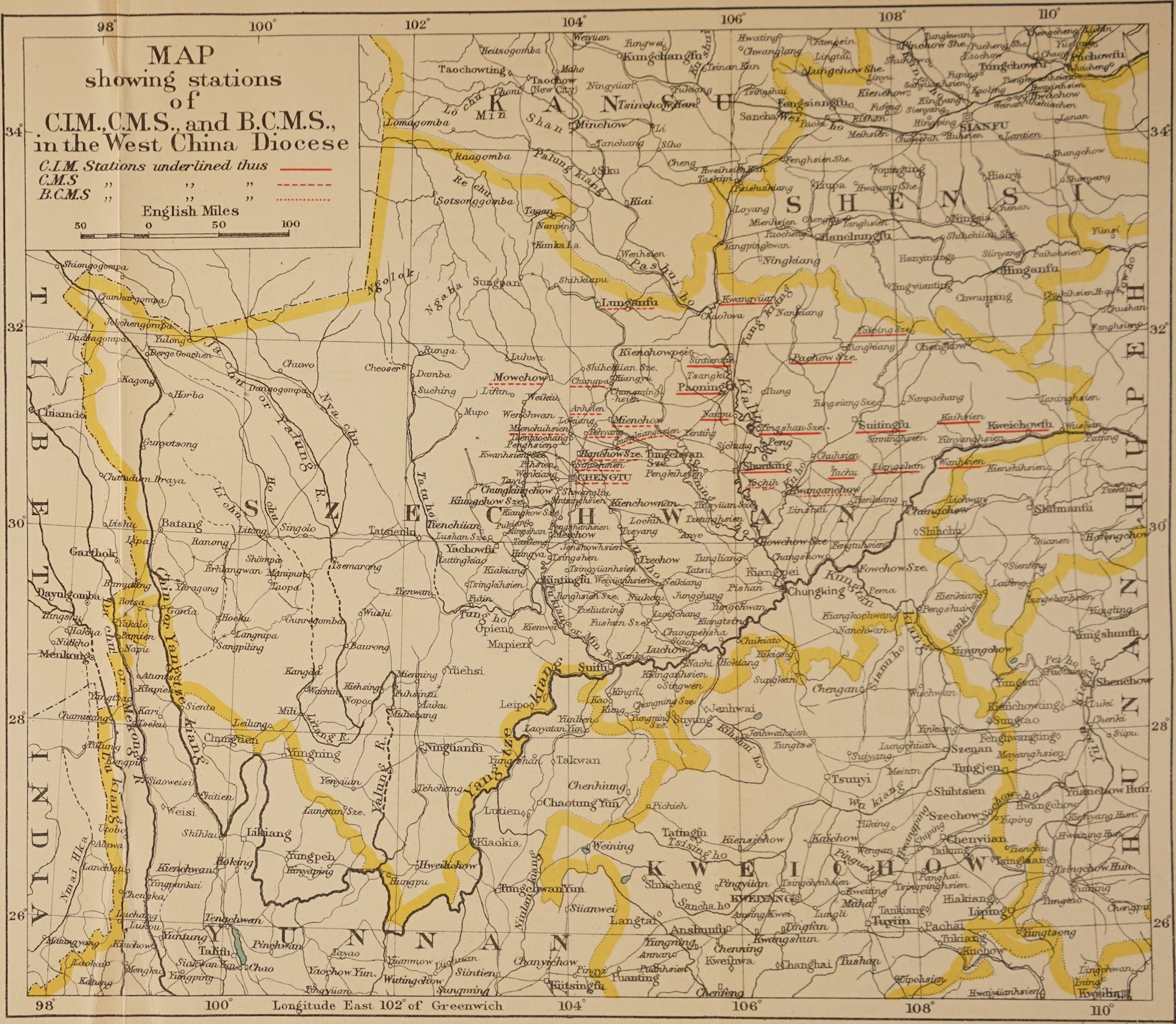
Map of Sichuan showing Anglican mission stations of China Inland Mission (CIM), Church Missionary Society (CMS) and Bible Churchmen's Missionary Society (BCMS)

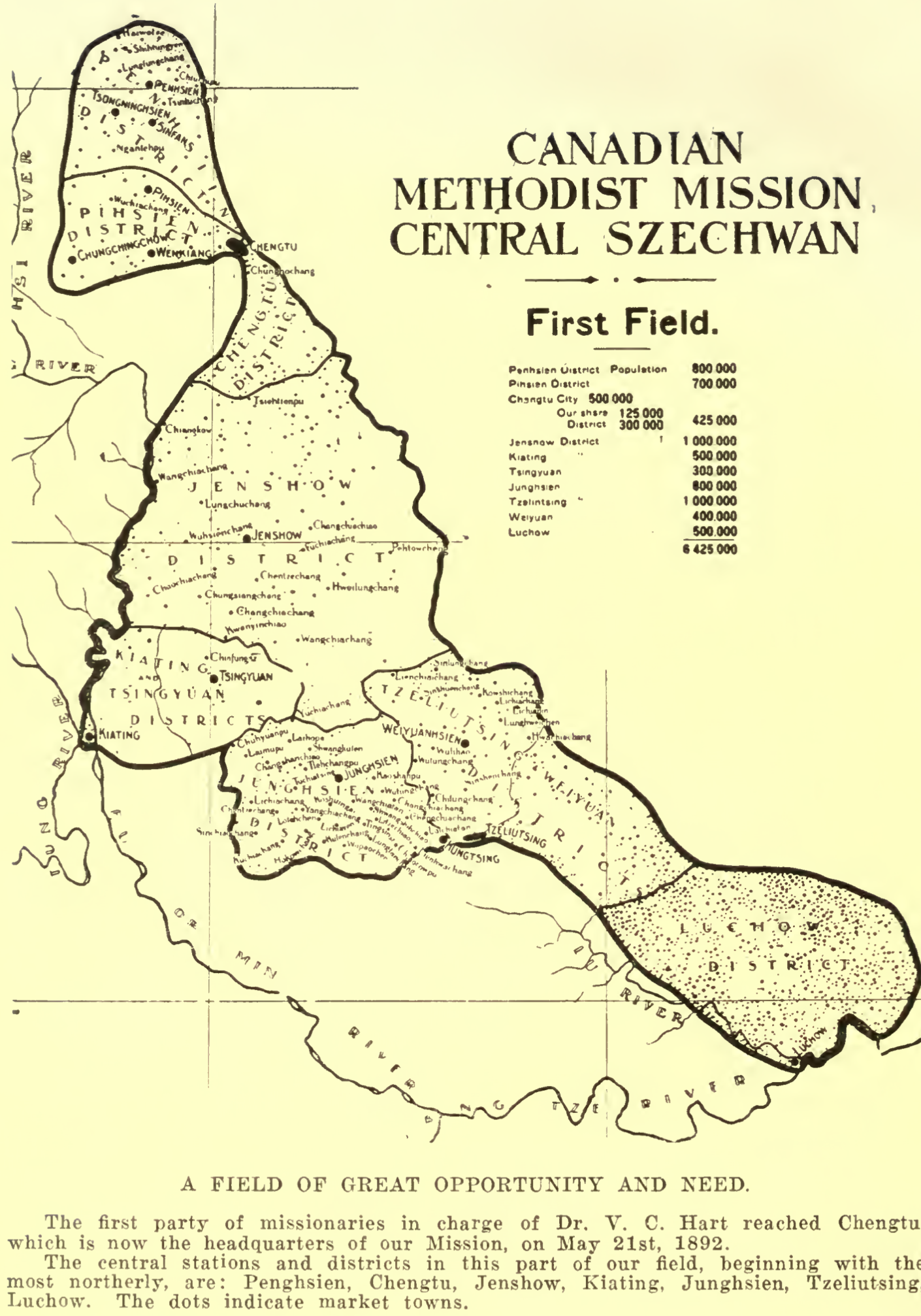
Canadian Methodist Mission in central Sichuan

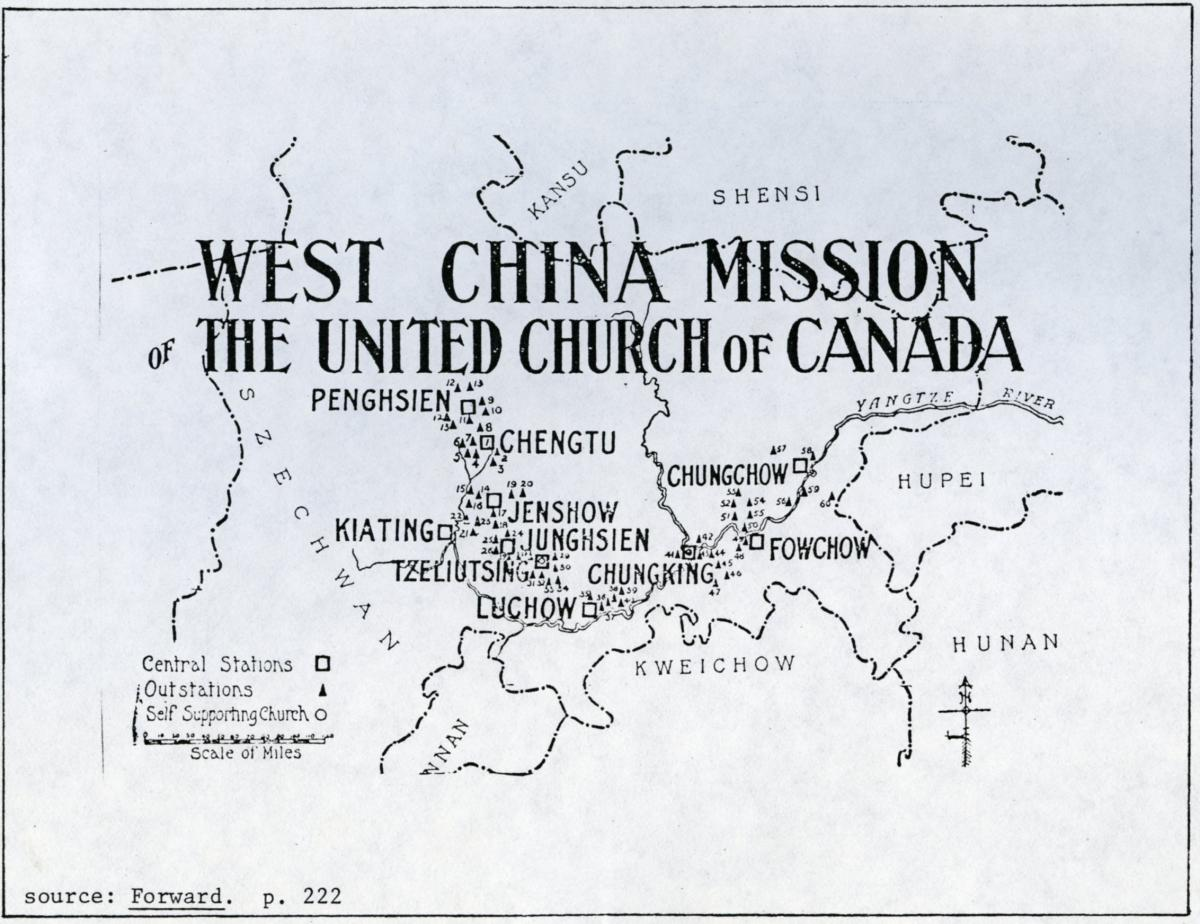
West China Mission of the United Church of Canada (Methodist)

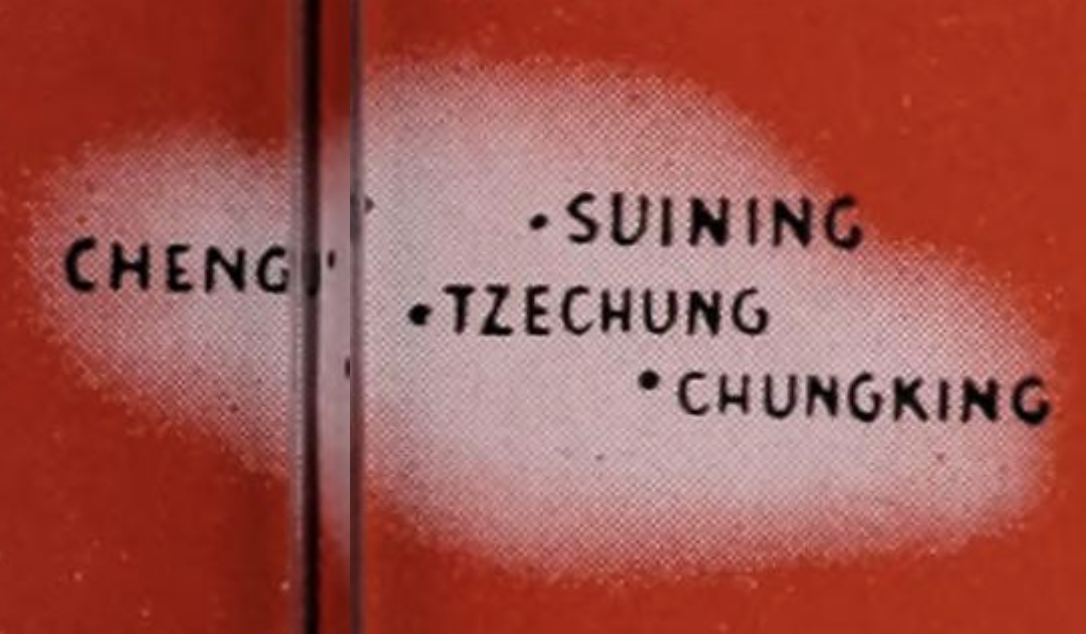
American Methodist Episcopal Mission area in Sichuan

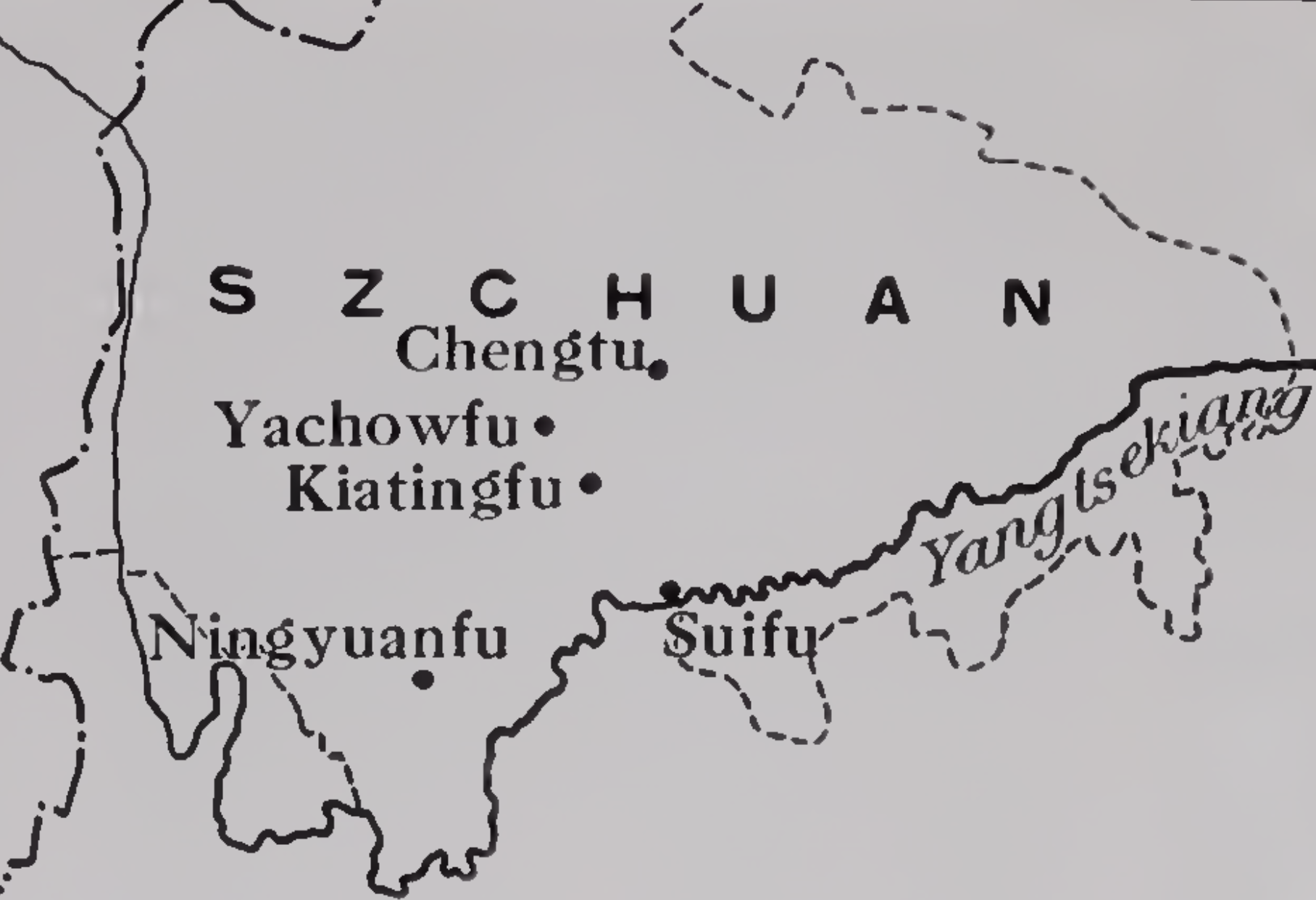
Map of Sichuan showing American Baptist mission stations

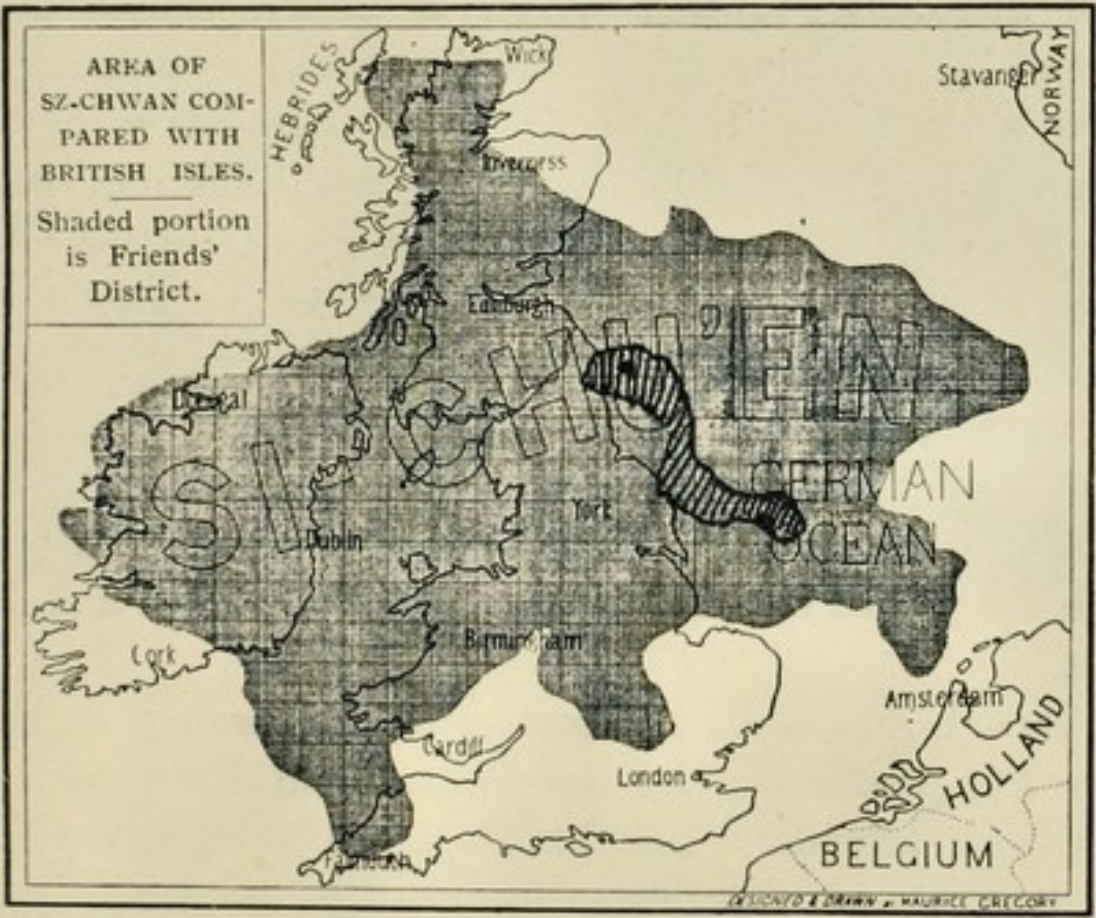
Area of Sichuan compared with British Isles. Shaded portion is Friends' Foreign Mission Association's district.

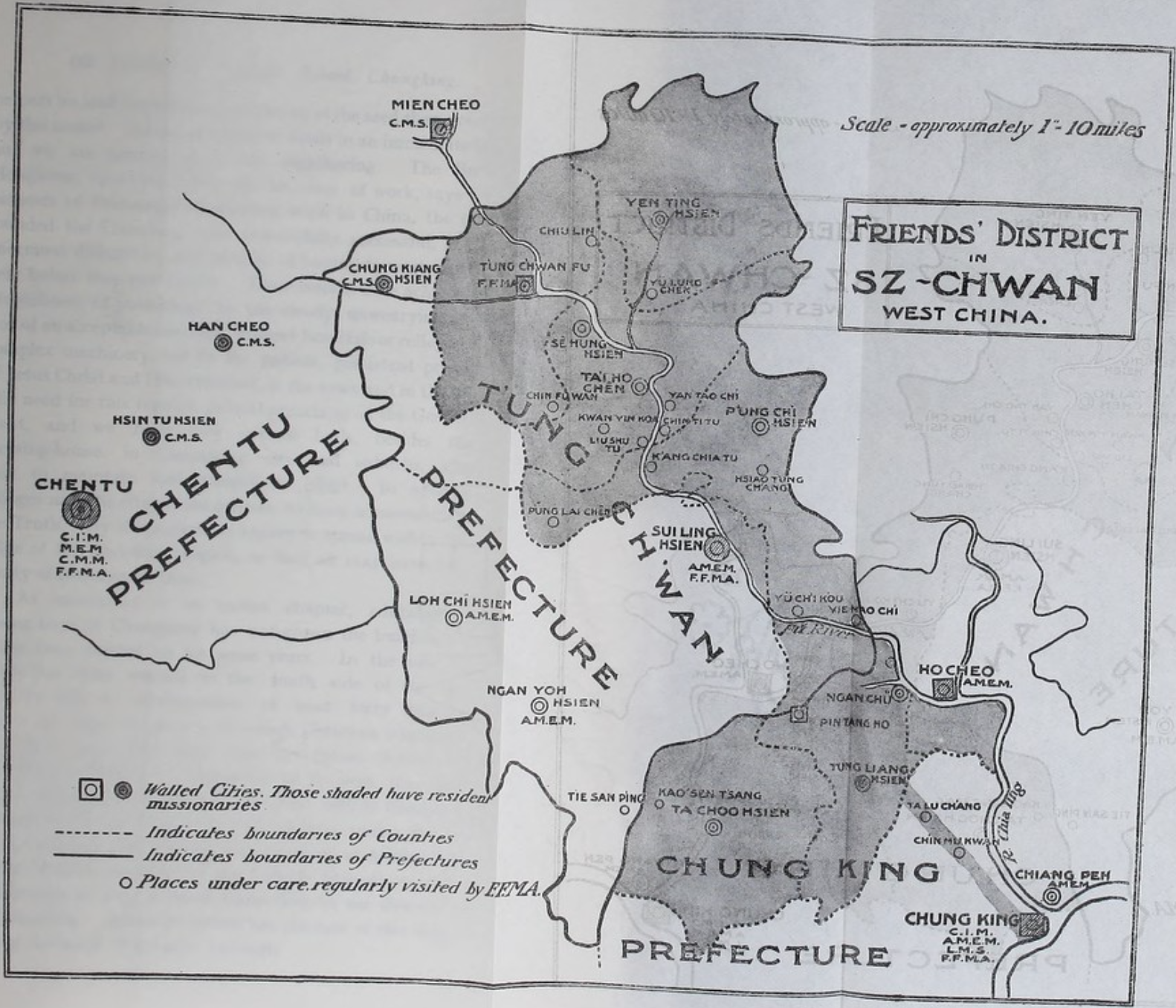
Friends' Foreign Mission Association's (Quaker) district in Sichuan

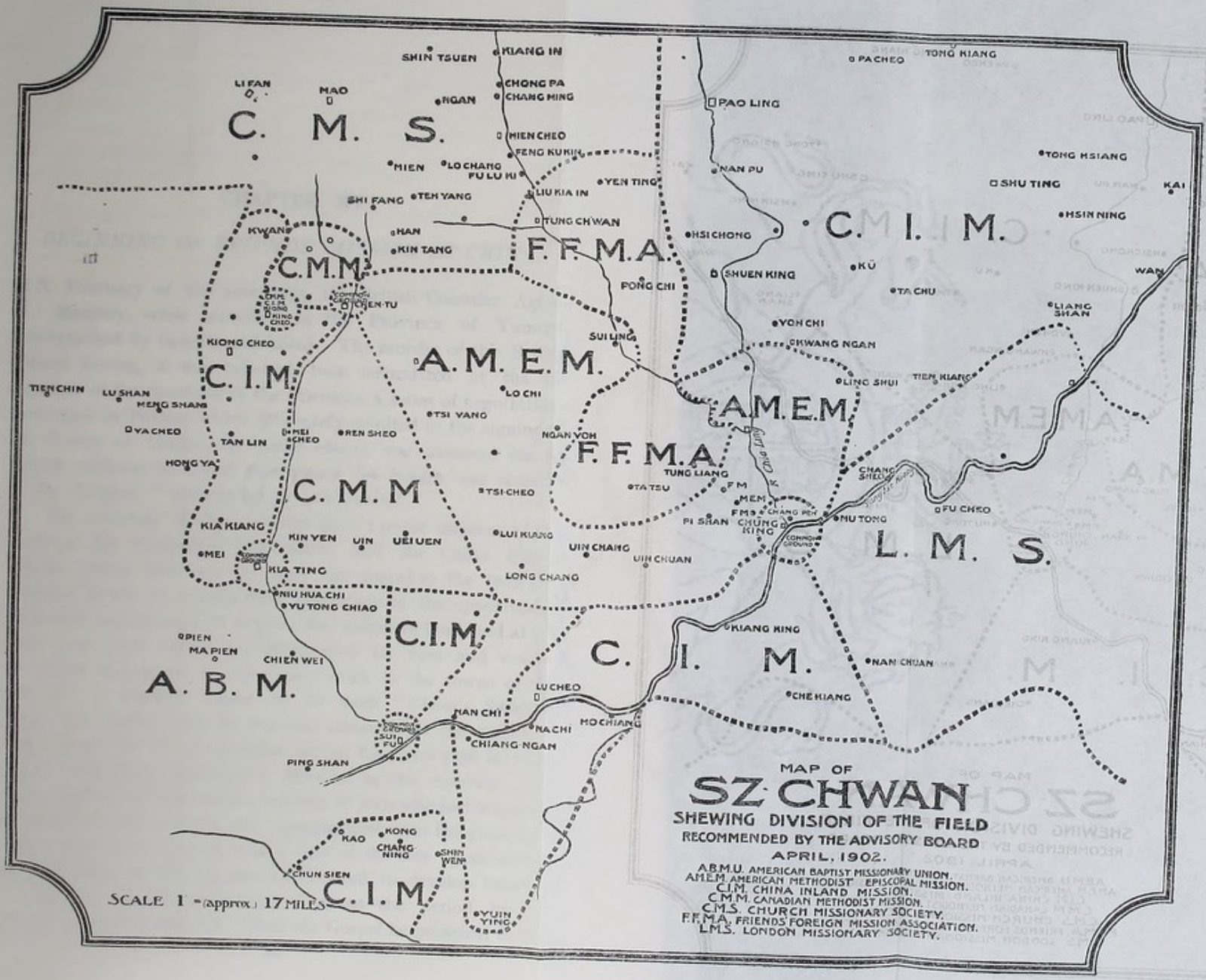
Map of Sichuan showing division of the field by seven Protestant mission societies: ABM, AMEM, CIM, CMM, CMS, FFMA, and LMS

== See also ==
- Christianity in Mianyang
- Islam in Sichuan
- Zoroastrianism in Sichuan
- An Account of the Entry of the Catholic Religion into Sichuan
- Anti-Christian Movement (China)
- Anti-missionary riots in China
- Antireligious campaigns of the Chinese Communist Party
- Chinese Rites controversy
- Denunciation Movement
- Khara-Khoto Christian manuscripts
- Underground church
- Category:Catholic Church in Sichuan
- Category:Protestantism in Sichuan
- Christianity in Sichuan's neighbouring provinces
  - Christianity in Guizhou
  - Christianity in Qinghai
  - Christianity in Shaanxi
  - Christianity in Tibet
