= Kenny Ng =

Hong Kong film scholar

- 吳國坤
- Born: Ng Kwok-kwan; Hong Kong
- Education: Chinese University of Hong Kong (BA); Hong Kong University of Science and Technology (MPhil); Harvard University (PhD)
- Occupation: Film scholar
- Years active: 2004–present

Kenny Ng Kwok-kwan (Chinese: 吳國坤) is a Hong Kong film scholar specializing in film censorship. He is currently an associate professor at the Hong Kong Baptist University.

== Early life and education ==
Ng obtained a Bachelor of Arts in English literature from the Chinese University of Hong Kong in 1991 and a Master of Philosophy in humanities from the Hong Kong University of Science and Technology in 1996. During his studies in Hong Kong, he was mentored by literary scholar William Tay. He then pursued doctoral studies in the United States, enrolling in the University of Washington from 1997 to 1999, but did not complete his degree. He then studied modern Chinese literature at Harvard University, earning a Doctor of Philosophy in East Asian studies in 2004. His dissertation focused on Chinese novelist Li Jieren, whose works were marginalized in the 1930s but gained recognition from the Chinese Communist Party in the 1950s.

== Career ==
Ng served as an assistant professor at the Hong Kong University of Science and Technology from 2004 to 2014. After completing his PhD, he dedicated several years to expanding his dissertation into a book, collecting additional material on Li Jieren's life through field research in his hometown. The reworked book was published in 2015 as The Lost Geopoetic Horizon of Li Jieren: The Crisis of Writing Chengdu in Revolutionary China. Sinologist Sebastien Veg praised the book as "the most engaging kind of doctoral research" and "persuasively argues that the main reason why Li has been ignored by the mainstream"; while historian Yuehtsen Juliette Chung noted that the book "makes a significant contribution" to the study of politics and culture in the People's Republic of China. Ng briefly taught at the Open University of Hong Kong and the City University of Hong Kong before joining the Academy of Film at Hong Kong Baptist University as an associate professor in 2017. His research primarily focuses on film censorship, including censorship during the British colonial period and after the Handover. In 2018, he co-edited Indiescape Hong Kong: Critical Interviews and Essays, a collection on Hong Kong cinema, with academics Enoch Tam and Vivian Lee.

In 2021, he published Yesterday, Today, Tomorrow: Hong Kong Cinema with Sino-links in Politics, Art, and Tradition, a book examining Hong Kong's film censorship. Scholar Leo Ou-fan Lee, who wrote the preface, commended the book for "covering a wide range of topics" and for "demonstrating Ng's extensive research efforts". Qin Xue from City University of Hong Kong described the book as "an invaluable academic resource" on the film history of mainland China and Hong Kong and suggested that it could "serve as a reference for future scholars"; while researcher Kuan Chee Wah lauded the book's scope as "rich" and viewed as "'history lesson' for contemporary filmmakers who are faced with a different censorship atmosphere from that of their predecessors". In 2022, Ng criticized Hong Kong's film censorship following the implementation of the 2020 Hong Kong national security law in an interview with BBC, where he likened the censorship to "a return to the 1950s" and expressed concern that it would "significantly impact independent films, documentaries, and short films".

== Bibliography ==
Year	Title	Original title	Publisher	Ref.
2015	The Lost Geopoetic Horizon of Li Jieren: The Crisis of Writing Chengdu in Revolutionary China	—N/a	Brill Publishers	
2018	Indiescape Hong Kong: Critical Interviews and Essays	香港獨立電影圖景: 訪問評論集	Typesetter Publishing	
2021	Yesterday, Today, Tomorrow: Hong Kong Cinema with Sino-links in Politics, Art, and Tradition	昨天今天明天：內地與香港電影的政治、藝術與傳統	Chung Hwa Book Company	
