= Enoch Tam =

Hong Kong writer, scholar, and film critic

- 譚以諾
- Born: Tam Yee-lok; Hong Kong
- Education: Hong Kong University of Science and Technology (BEng, MA, MPhil); Hong Kong Baptist University (PhD)
- Occupations: Writer; Scholar; Film critic
- Years active: 2014–present

Enoch Tam Yee-lok (Chinese: 譚以諾) is a Hong Kong writer, scholar, and film critic. He is the founder of film review website Cinezen, art news website Paratext, and the publisher Typesetter Publishing. He is currently an assistant professor at Lingnan University.

== Early life and education ==
Tam attended an all-boys secondary school, where he developed an early interest in reading, particularly wuxia and sci-fi novels with his peers. He later pursued studies in computer science at the Hong Kong University of Science and Technology, and graduated with a Bachelor of Engineering in 2003. Due to the university's mandatory requirement for students to take humanities electives, he enrolled in courses on poetry and Taiwanese literature, which sparked his interest in literature. Briefly working after his undergraduate studies, he returned to HKUST to pursue a Master of Arts and a Master of Philosophy in humanities from 2005 to 2007 and 2007 to 2009 respectively. In 2018, Tam earned a Doctor of Philosophy in communication from the Hong Kong Baptist University, with his doctoral thesis focused on late Qing studies.

== Career ==
=== Scholarship ===
Tam began writing literary reviews during his MA studies, and served as an editor for the literary magazine Fleurs des lettres. In 2010, he won first prize in the Hong Kong Public Library's Creative Writing Awards for his literary review essay "Critical Attitude and 'Reoccupation': A Case Study of Ng Hui-bun's 'Stone', 'Mountain', and 'Hunter'". He published his first novel The Happy Times of Blackeye in 2011, a work heavily influenced by Taiwanese writer Luo Yijun's narrative style according to Tam. In 2014, Tam received the Award for Young Artist (Arts Criticism) at the Hong Kong Arts Development Awards. He also became a part-time lecturer at the Academy of Film, Hong Kong Baptist University in the same year.

From 2016 to 2021, he served as the undergraduate program director at HKBU. In 2017, Tam published his second fictional work, a collection of short stories Therefore I sit down and listen to the tales of H City told by Bartender M. The collection was the first publication of Post Script Cultural Collaboration, which Tam approached through his friend and founder Ho Heng-yi, preferring to publish outside large publishing houses to retain editorial control over his work. Two stories from this collection, "Auntie Han's Modern Life" and "The Mushroom Houses Proliferated in District M", were later translated into English by Jeremy Tiang and included in the 2020 anthology That We May Live: Speculative Chinese Fiction. In 2018, he co-edited Indiescape Hong Kong: Critical Interviews and Essays, a collection on Hong Kong cinema, with academics Kenny Ng and Vivian Lee. He also contributed an essay on identity politics in Ann Hui's films to Ann Hui: Forty, an critique collection edited by Cecilia Wong and Stephanie Ng. Vogue Hong Kong's Yu Lanlan wrote that Tam "summarized Hui's early films and criticized their insufficient treatment of women's social and cultural inequalities in family and work settings" in his essay.

In 2020, Tam translated Yip Man-fung's essay collection Martial Arts Cinema and Hong Kong Modernity: Aesthetics, Representation, Circulation into Chinese. That same year, he publicly criticized the Office for Film, Newspaper and Article Administration for categorizing the political documentary Inside the Red Brick Wall as Category III and accused them of destroying the submitted disk as an act of criminal damage. After being invited to speak at a post-screening talk of that film in 2021, Tam further criticized that "commercial cinemas have increasingly avoided screening political films". In January 2022, Tam was appointed an assistant professor in the Department of Digital Arts and Creative Industries at Lingnan University. That year, he translated Nick Srnicek's Platform Capitalism into Chinese and invited scholar Pun Ngai to write the preface for the Chinese edition.

=== Cultural criticism ===
Tam founded the film review website Cinezen (映畫手民) in 2014, serving as its editor-in-chief. He explained that the main reason for founding Cinezen was a "primary focus on films, as films have the ability to reach a wide audience and generate more discussions". On 2 May 2024, he ceased the operations of Cinezen, citing reasons such as finding the website to "lose its meaning" and financial burdens. Tam is also a member of the Hong Kong Film Critics Society, and one of the co-founders of the arts news and literary review website Paratext.

=== Typesetter Publishing ===
Tam founded Typesetter Publishing (手民出版社) through his film review website Cinezen in 2015, initially with the aim of publishing Tales of Honey: A Collection of Interviews with Post-80s Directors from Greater China, a compilation of interviews with Hong Kong filmmakers. In 2018, while seeking publishers for Indiescape Hong Kong: Critical Interviews and Essays, Tam discovered that Sino United Publishing and university presses were the only companies in Hong Kong publishing academic works, therefore he decided to shift Typesetter's focus toward academic books, providing an alternative option for authors. Typesetter published three books on Hong Kong studies that same year, including Indiescape Hong Kong, and continued to publish academic works related to Hong Kong and gender studies in 2019. As of March 2019, Tam was the sole operator of the publisher, handling editing and typesetting himself while outsourcing other tasks to freelancers or friends. The publisher continued operations through the 2019–2020 Hong Kong protests, maintaining its focus on literature and Hong Kong studies rather than venturing into politics, as Tam deemed Hong Kong still needed publishers to support overlooked academic fields and preserve diverse voices in society. Openbook, a Taiwanese online literary magazine, had selected works from Typesetter Publishing multiple times in their weekly book recommendation column as of February 2023.

== Bibliography ==
| Year | Title | Original title | Publisher | Ref. |
|---|---|---|---|---|
| 2011 | The Happy Times of Blackeye | 黑目的快樂年代 | Twilit Publication | |
| 2017 | On Earth We Stand: Hong Kong Independent Film Festival, 2008–2017 | 在地而立：香港獨立電影節 2008–2017 | Typesetter Publishing | |
| 2017 | The Landscape of Pseudosecular World: A Critical Inquiry into the Film "Pseudo Secular" | 偽現世的風景：電影《風景》的真實叩問 | Typesetter Publishing | |
| 2017 | Therefore I Sit Down and Listen to the Tales of H City Told by Bartender M | 於是我坐下，聽調酒師M說關於H城的傳說 | Post Script Cultural Collaboration | |
| 2018 | Indiescape Hong Kong: Critical Interviews and Essays | 香港獨立電影圖景: 訪問評論集 | Typesetter Publishing | |
| 2020 | Martial Arts Cinema and Hong Kong Modernity: Aesthetics, Representation, Circulation | 武俠電影與香港現代性 | Typesetter Publishing | |
| 2022 | Platform Capitalism | 平台資本主義 | Typesetter Publishing | |
