= Chinese Literature Press =

Book publisher in China

- Simplified Chinese: 中国文学出版社
- Traditional Chinese: 中國文學出版社
Transcriptions
Standard Mandarin
- Hanyu Pinyin: Zhōngguó Wénxué Chūbǎnshè

The Chinese Literature Press (中国文学出版社) is a state-owned book publisher in China established in 1951, focusing on translating Chinese literature into other languages.

Since the 1980s, more than 200 titles have been published by the press in English and French as their "Panda Book Series".

== Books ==
- Ripple on Stagnant Water (as Ripples Across Stagnant Water)
