= St. Thérèse of Lisieux Church, Chongqing =

St. Thérèse of Lisieux Church
- Jiangbei St. Thérèse Church
- 江北德肋撒堂
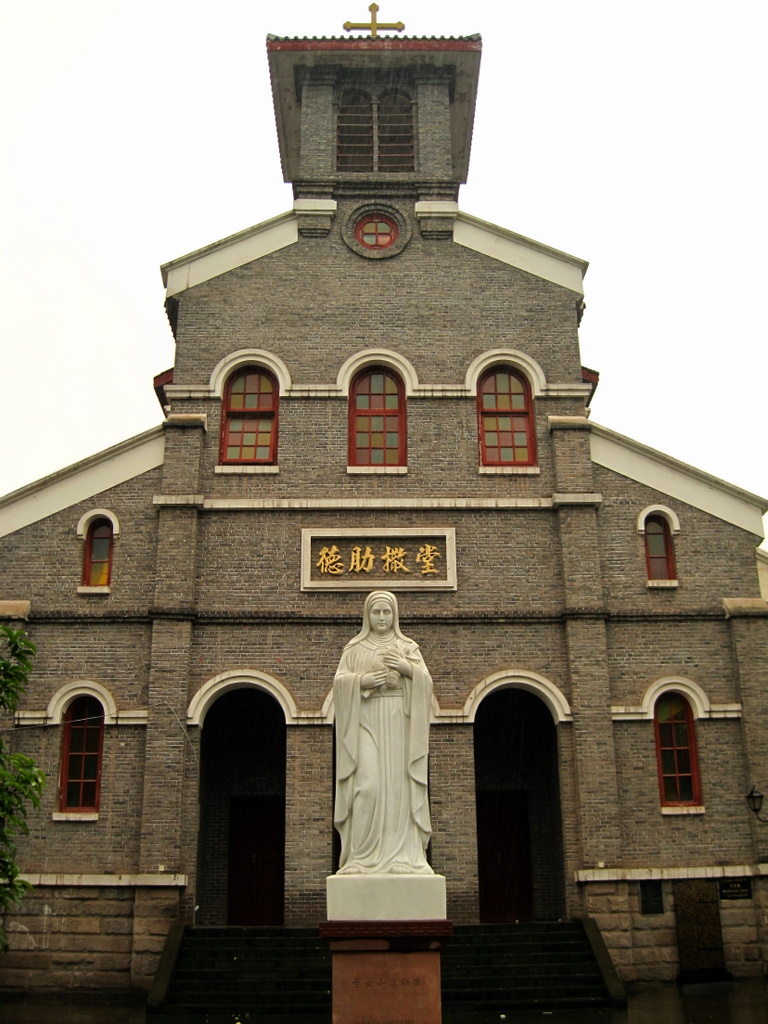
- The front façade of the church in 2010, showing the characters "德肋撒堂" (lit. 'St. Thérèse Church')
- St. Thérèse of Lisieux Church
- 29°34′32″N 106°34′24″E
- Address: 14 Guihua Street, Jiangbei, Chongqing
- Country: China
- Denomination: Catholic

History
- Status: Church
- Founded: 1855
- Founder: Paris Foreign Missions Society
- Dedication: Saint Thérèse of Lisieux
- Dedicated: 1928

Architecture
- Functional status: Active
- Style: Romanesque Revival
- Completed: 2008

Administration
- Archdiocese: Chongqing

Clergy
- Priest: Zhao Xiaoping

St. Thérèse of Lisieux Church, Chongqing, also known as Jiangbei St. Thérèse Church, is a Catholic church located in Jiangbei District, Chongqing, southwestern China. Originally constructed in 1855, it underwent destruction and subsequent reconstruction multiple times during the Qing dynasty. It has been subjected to the control of the state-sanctioned Catholic Patriotic Association since 1957. The church was seized during the Cultural Revolution (1966–1976) but was later returned and reopened in the late 20th century. In 2008, it was relocated to its current position.

== History ==
In 1855, a French priest purchased a civilian residence and made it into a church. It was called the "Boji Church" (博济堂), and it was at Mitingzi (米亭子). In 1876, the church was burnt during an anti-Christian riot in Jiangbei. It was rebuilt in 1881. According to the Catholic Church in Chongqing, the church building was destroyed during the riots of 1881 and 1897–1898. It was rebuilt after each riot.

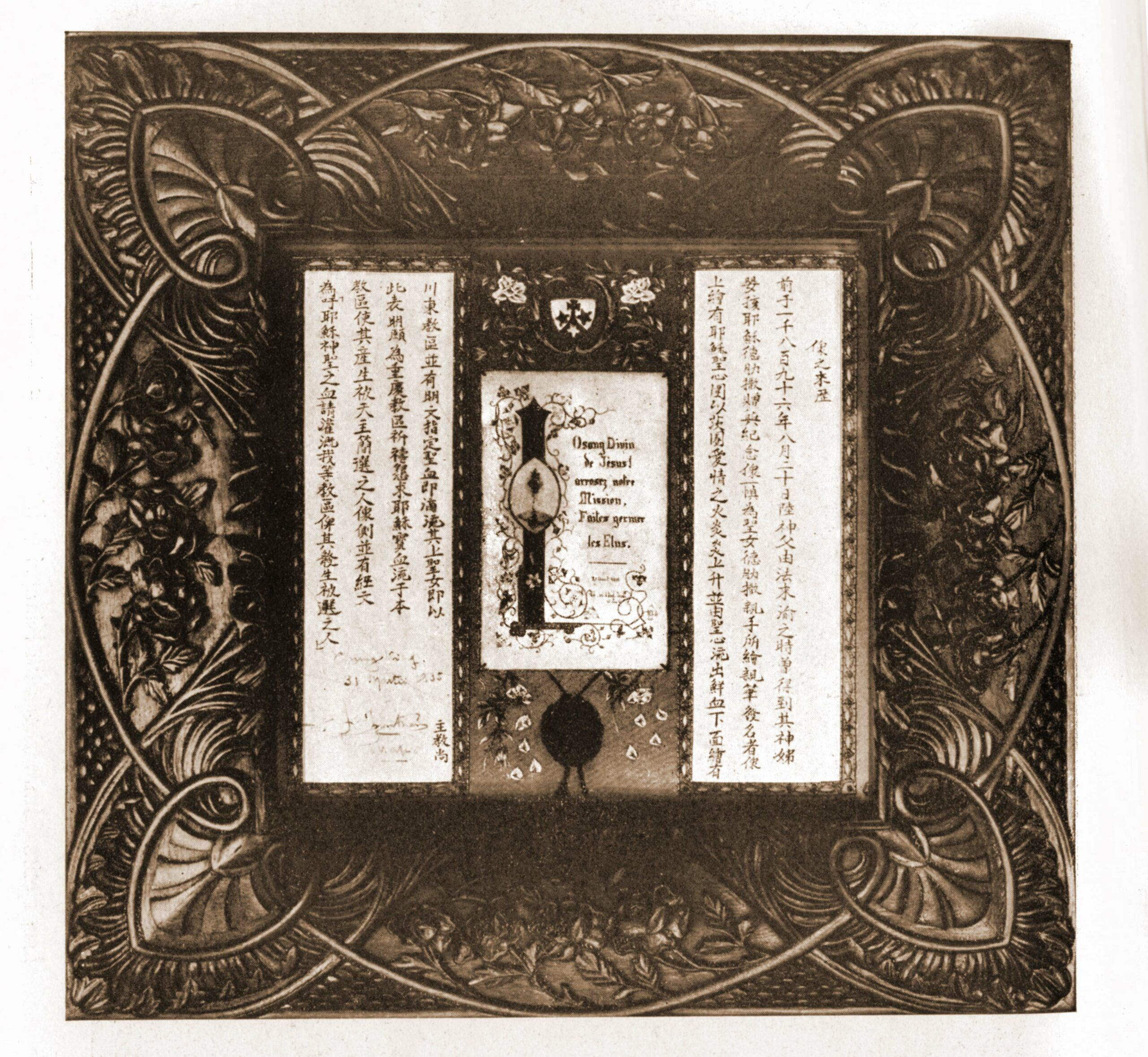
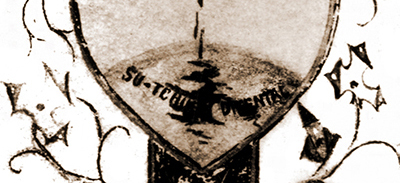
Saint Thérèse's Sacred Heart picture for Father Adolphe Roulland, a missionary to Eastern Su-Tchuen. Beneath the Divine Blood flowing on the earth, she inscribed "Eastern Su-Tchuen" (Su-Tchuen oriental), as can be discerned in the enlarged detail below.

During the March 31st Incident in 1927, the Sichuan warlord Liu Xiang opened fire on the locals in Chongqing. Louis-Gabriel-Xavier Jantzen, the Apostolic Vicar of Chongqing, prayed for the protection of the missionaries and the local Catholics, and willed to renovate the church if they survived the incident. He published a letter that called local Catholics to donate money for the renovation of the church. In his letter, he mentioned that he dedicated the Catholic Church in Eastern Sichuan (Su-Tchuen oriental) to Saint Thérèse of Lisieux for protection during the ongoing warfare, and wish to build a church for thanksgiving. The renovation and expansion completed in 1928. (Note: The Galileo Galilei Italian Institute gives that the church was rebuilt in 1927.) At the time, there were about 250 parishioners, including 100 men and 150 women.

During the Cultural Revolution, the church was appropriated by Jiangbei District Factory of Automobile Parts (江北区汽车配件厂). The Chinese characters above the door "德肋撒堂" (lit. 'St. Thérèse Church') were demolished. After the 3rd plenary session of the 11th Central Committee of the Chinese Communist Party, the church was returned to the local Catholic community. In July 1988, the government of Jiangbei District designated the church as a "Major Historical and Cultural Site" protected at the district level. The church was re-opened in 1994.

From 2005 to 2008, during the demolition and restructuring of Jiangbei District, the church was relocated to its current site and reconstructed according to its original appearance. On 1 October 2008, Bishop Joseph Ma Yinglin celebrated the opening ceremony of the new church building. The concelebrants included Paul He Zeqing, the assistant bishop of the Diocese of Wanxian. Over 1,000 people attended the ceremony, including Chongqing parishioners, religious sisters, and local officials.

On 28 April 2011, Wang Zuo'an, then the director of the State Administration for Religious Affairs of China, visited the church. From 2012 to 2015, the church was refurnished by the Chongqing government. On 8 December 2015, Bishop Ma celebrated the rededication of the church in a thanksgiving Mass with about 800 attendees.

== Architecture ==
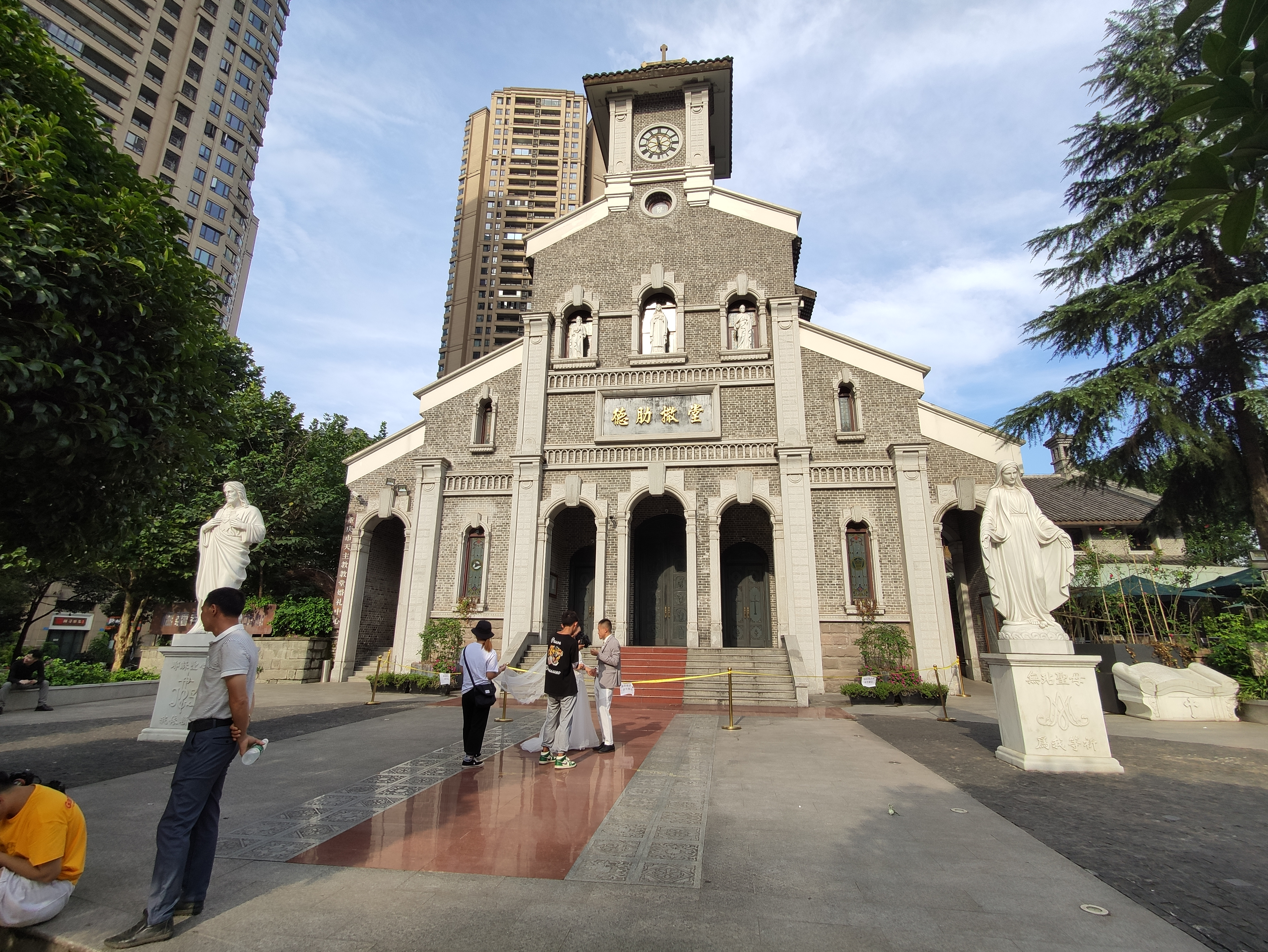
The front yard of the church in 2019, featuring a statue of the Sacred Heart of Jesus (left) and a statue of Our Lady of the Immaculate Conception (right)

The current church complex has a total area of 1,822 square metres (19,610 sq ft). The floor area of the entire church complex is 1,356 square metres (14,600 sq ft). The Neo-Romanesque church building is 36.6 metres (120 ft) long and 15.04 metres (49.3 ft) wide. Its bell tower is 27 metres (89 ft) tall. Inside the bell tower, there is a French bronze bell that survived the Cultural Revolution. The bell has a diameter of 0.56 metres (22 in) and a height of 0.54 metres (21 in).

=== Interior ===
The church hall has an area of 522.72 square metres (5,626.5 sq ft). The nave is 15 metres (49 ft) tall, and the side aisles are 7 metres (23 ft) tall. There are eight Neo-Romanesque pillars on the two sides of the church.

On the east side, the altar is placed in an apse with a radius of 1.5 metres (4.9 ft). At the top of the apse, there is a mural depicting the Ascension of Jesus. A cross is hang in front of the apse. There is a statue of Saint Joseph and a statue of Our Lady of Lourdes on each side of the altar.

On the north and south sides of the church hall, there are fourteen bronze Stations of the Cross. There are also eight niches on the sides, each containing a painting of a biblical event. There are 32 stained glass windows in the church, showing stories from the Old and New Testaments.

=== Exterior and associated buildings ===
The front yard of the church has several statues: on the south, there is a statue of Our Lady of the Immaculate Conception; on the north, there is a statue of the Sacred Heart of Jesus. Each statue is made of white marble and is based on a one-meter-tall pedestal. There are also three statues on the church building, including one of Saint Thérèse of Lisieux.

Attached to the south of the church building, there is an Italian restaurant, with a length of 16.5 metres (54 ft) and a depth of 13.2 metres (43 ft). In front of the restaurant, there is another square courtyard with a side length of 18 metres (59 ft). At the southwestern corner of the courtyard, there is a statue of the Holy Family. There is also a statue of Matteo Ricci holding his Kunyu Wanguo Quantu world map on the southern side of the courtyard. Both statues are made of white marble and are two meters tall.

== See also ==
- Christianity in Sichuan
- Catholic Church in Sichuan
