= Casual Records of the Nenggai Studio =

- Author: Wu Zeng
- Language: Chinese
- Published: 1157

Casual Records of the Nenggai Studio
- Traditional Chinese: 能改齋漫錄
- Simplified Chinese: 能改斋漫录
Transcriptions
Standard Mandarin
- Hanyu Pinyin: Nénggǎi zhāi mànlù

The biji (literally "notebook") Nenggai zhai manlu (能改齋漫錄 / 能改斋漫录, pinyin Nénggǎi zhāi mànlù, variously rendered Loose Records from the Studio of Possible Change, Random Notes from Able-to-Change Studio, Casual Records of the Nenggai Studio, and Recollections of the Master of Nenggai) was written by Wu Zeng (吳曾 / 吴曾, fl. 1127–1160) during the Song Dynasty. Wu Zeng was patronised by the politician Qin Hui (Chinese: 秦檜 / 秦桧) (1090–1155), and the text correspondingly often glorifies Qin Hui. Published in year twenty-seven of the Shaoxing (紹興) reign of the Southern Song (1157 CE), the work originally comprised around twenty booklets (Chinese: 卷).

== Contents ==
The current edition comprises eighteen themed juan arranged in thirteen chapters; a humorous section (huīxié tánxuè Chinese: 詼諧談謔 / 诙谐谈) has been lost. Many of the themes were conventional to notebooks of the time. They include:

- 1: The beginning of things (shìshǐ 事始), part 1
- 2: The beginning of things (shìshǐ 事始), part 2
- 3: Correction of errors (biànwù 辨誤 / 辨误), part 1
- 4: Correction of errors (biànwù 辨誤 / 辨误), part 2
- 5: Correction of errors (biànwù 辨誤 / 辨误), part 3
- 6: Events (shìshí 事實 / 事实), part 1
- 7: Events (shìshí 事實 / 事实), part 2
- 8: 沿襲
- 9: Geography (dìlǐ 地理), including geographical changes since antiquity
- 10: Discussions (yìlùn 議論 / 议论)
- 11: Records of poetry (jishi 記詩), situating poetry in its social contexts
- 12: 記事, part 1
- 13: 記事, part 2
- 14: Records and Writings, Similarities
- 15: Regional things (fangwu 方物), including the wonders of nature found in different places.
- 16: Yuefu poems (yuèfǔ 樂府 / 乐府), part 1
- 17: Yuefu poems (yuèfǔ 樂府 / 乐府), part 2
- 18: Spirits and ghosts (shenxian guiguai 神仙鬼怪), including supernatural wonders

The text often constitutes text-critical study and contains a great deal of literary material from the Tang and Song dynasties. It is also an important source for the history of Chinese eating and drinking culture, especially the Tang and Song dynasties, and of the Pearl Temple.

== Reception ==
It appears that, perhaps because Wu Zeng fell into political disfavour, Casual Records of the Nenggai Studio fell out of print from the Yuan period (1279-1368), if not before. However, Ming period scholars (1368-1644) found texts of the work and it returned to circulation.

== Editions ==
The work is included in many old book collections (congshu) and also in the book series on Chinese eating and drinking culture called Zhongguo pengren guji congkan.

- Wu, Zeng (1843). Nenggai zhai manlu (in Traditional Chinese).
- A modern corrected and punctuated edition was published in 1979 by the Shanghai guji chubanshe (上海古籍出版社) publishing house, which contains collected passages from books from the Song and Yuan dynasties as well as from the encyclopedia Yongle dadian (永樂大典 / 永乐大典).
- Wikisource
