= Li Jieren =

Chinese writer and translator

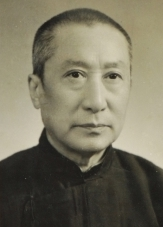
- Born: Li Jiaxiang 李家祥; 20 June 1891; Chengdu, Sichuan
- Died: 24 December 1962 (aged 71); Chengdu, Sichuan

Li Jieren (Chinese: 李劼人; pinyin: Lǐ Jiérén; Wade–Giles: Li Chieh-jên; Sichuanese romanization: Li Chie-ren; June 20, 1891 – December 24, 1962) was a Chinese writer and translator. A native of Chengdu, his works are celebrated for their local flavor and realistic portrayal of Sichuan during the late Qing period.

== Life ==
Born Li Jiaxiang (Chinese: 李家祥; pinyin: Lǐ Jiāxiáng) in Chengdu to a family of humble means, he did not begin formal schooling until the age of 16. He graduated from the secondary school attached to the Sichuan Higher School (a predecessor of Sichuan University) in 1911 and published his first work of fiction in 1912. From 1919 to 1924 Li studied in France, first in Paris and then in Montpellier; he would later become the first to translate the works of French writers such as Guy de Maupassant, Alphonse Daudet, and Gustave Flaubert into Chinese.

He is best known for a trilogy of long novels set in his native Sichuan and published during the 1930s. The first and most widely acclaimed of these was translated into English as Ripple on Stagnant Water (Chinese: 死水微澜). The third and longest volume in the trilogy, The Great Wave (Chinese: 大波), chronicles the events of the 1911 Revolution in Sichuan. In the late 1950s, Li revised The Great Wave significantly. His fiction is considered among the finest examples of Chinese literary naturalism.

Li was active in the literary field of Republican China throughout the 1930s and 40s as a writer, editor, and French-Chinese translator. After the establishment of the PRC in 1949, he held various government positions in Sichuan, including that of vice mayor of Chengdu. From 1958, he chaired the Chengdu Topographical Museum Preparatory Committee, located at Daci Temple, which led to the establishment of Chengdu Museum in 1984 at the temple. He died in Chengdu in 1962. The house he had built on the outskirts of Chengdu during the war with Japan in 1939 now serves as a memorial and museum dedicated to his life and work.

Li Jieren's Complete Works, including his translations of French novels, were published in 17 volumes in 2011 by Sichuan Literature and Art Publishing House (Chinese: 四川文艺出版社; pinyin: Sìchuān Wényì Chūbǎnshè).

== Works ==
- 同情 (1924; Sympathy)
- 好人家 (1925; Good People)
- 大河小说三部曲 (The Great River Trilogy)
  - 死水微澜 (1936; Ripple on Stagnant Water)
  - 暴风雨前 (1936; Before the Storm)
  - 大波 (1937; Great Wave)
- 天魔舞 (1985; Dance of the Demons)

== See also ==
- The Lost Geopoetic Horizon of Li Jieren
