= Pearl Temple =

- Location: Stalagmite Street, Yizhou City, Yizhou (modern-day Sichuan)
- Country: Tang dynasty (618–907)
- Denomination: Church of the East

History
- Former name: Castle of Seven Treasures
- Status: Church
- Founded: No later than 756 AD
- Founder: East Syriac missionaries

Architecture
- Functional status: Destroyed
- Demolished: During the Tang dynasty

Pearl Temple (Note: traditional Chinese: 珍珠樓; simplified Chinese: 珍珠楼; archaic form: 眞珠樓 or 真珠樓; pinyin: Zhēnzhū lóu; Sichuanese romanization: Chen^{1} Chu^{1} Leo^{2}) was a Church of the East church in Yizhou City (modern-day Chengdu) built no later than 756 AD on the ruins of the ancient Shu-era Castle of Seven Treasures (Note: traditional Chinese: 七寶樓; simplified Chinese: 七宝楼; pinyin: Qībǎo lóu; Sichuanese romanization: Ts'ie^{5} Pao^{3} Leo^{2}) (a.k.a. Pearl Castle). It was located on Stalagmite Street (Note: or Shisun Street (traditional Chinese: 石筍街; simplified Chinese: 石笋街; pinyin: Shísǔn Jiē; Sichuanese romanization: Shï^{5} Sen^{3} Kai^{1})) outside the west gate of the city. According to the Illustrated Chorography of Shu, (Note: Illustrated Chorography of Shu (traditional Chinese: 蜀圖經; simplified Chinese: 蜀图经; pinyin: Shǔ Tújīng; Sichuanese romanization: Shu^{5} Tu^{2} Chin^{1})) the church was destroyed on an unspecified date during the chaos caused by a military conflict in the Tang dynasty (618–907).

== Historical accounts ==
Little is known about the appearances of the castle and the church, except that they were both decorated with pearls. According to the 4th-century gazetteer Chronicles of the Southern Lands by Chang Qu: "The Castle of Seven Treasures was built by ancient Shu kings of the Kaiming dynasty (666 BC – 316 BC) with curtains made of pearls. It was burned down, together with thousands of houses, by the Great Fire of Shu Commandery during the reign of Emperor Wu of Han (141 BC – 87 BC). Nowadays, people often find pearls in the castle's ruins."

A description of Pearl Temple found in Zhao Bian's Stories of Shu Commandery (Note: Stories of Shu Commandery (Chinese: 蜀郡故事; pinyin: Shǔjùn gùshì; Sichuanese romanization: Shu^{5} Chüin^{4} Ku^{4} Sï^{4})) (11th century) reads as follows: "The 'stalagmites' outside the west gate of the city are said to be the foundation of Pearl Castle, on whose ruins a Daqin temple (i.e., an East Syriac church) was built by "Hu" missionaries. The temple consisted of halls and towers totaling 10 spaces. Its doors and windows were decorated with curtains made of gold, pearls and green jasper (or jadeite beads). It was later destroyed and fell to the ground, but the foundation remained. Pearls, gold and green gems were often found in the ruins after heavy rains. The stones known today as 'stalagmites' are not the foundation but [a pair of dolmens] situated next to the temple. The Daqin empire, whence a variety of precious stones is obtained, namely, lapis lazuli, emeralds, pearls, and luminous jade. Its waterways lead to Yi Prefecture and Yongchang Commandery, wherefore the temple was built by people from Daqin."

The Illustrated Chorography of Shu also states that the halls and towers of the temple "were decorated with gold and pearls," and calls it "an enchanting edifice of its time," but "it was later abandoned and destroyed during the chaos caused by a military conflict."

The above-mentioned accounts are repeated as a single history in volume 18 of the 12th-century biji collection Loose Records from the Studio of Possible Change by Wu Zeng, and in volume 2 of A Detailed Account of the Shu Province by Cao Xuequan (1575–1646). The history of Pearl Temple is also recounted in volume 7 of Du Gongbu's Poems Annotated by Thousand Scholars, (Note: Du Gongbu's Poems Annotated by Thousand Scholars (traditional Chinese: 集千家註杜工部詩集; simplified Chinese: 集千家注杜工部诗集; pinyin: Jí qiānjiā zhù Dù Gōngbù shījí)) for the ruins of the church are the subject of Du Gongbu's poem "The Stone Shoots: A Ballad": (Note: Original title in traditional Chinese: 石筍行; simplified Chinese: 石笋行; pinyin: Shísǔn xíng; Sichuanese romanization: Shï^{5} Sen^{3} Shin^{2}; lit. 'Stalagmites: A Ballad'. English translation published in The Poetry of Du Fu, Volume 3.) "Have you not seen by the west gate of Yizhou City, by a field lane the 'Stone Shoots,' (Note: These were a pair of dolmens outside of Chengdu.) a pair crouching high. Since ancient times it's been said that these were 'eyes of the sea,' (Note: Springs that connect directly with the ocean underground.) mosses and lichens have eaten away all traces of waves and billows. In heavy rains one often finds rare green gems—these things are a muddle and hard to explain clearly." He was unaware of the site being the ruins of a church, for he went on to write: "I suspect that in olden days these were tombs of a minister or grandee, they set the stones up as markers, and they still survive today."

In light of the fact that Pearl Temple had already been destroyed when "The Stone Shoots: A Ballad" was being written by Du Gongbu, who stayed in Yizhou during the reigns of the emperors Suzong and Daizong (756–779), Duan Yuming speculated that the construction of the temple was no later than the Xuanzong period (712–756).

== "Stalagmites" ==
The so-called "stalagmites" were interpreted as a pair of dolmens or menhirs located outside the west gate of Yizhou City, which are no longer extant. According to Chang Qu's Chronicles of the Southern Lands, they were erected by five legendary warriors and served as tomb markers for the kings of Ancient Shu. They were also said to be the foundation of the Castle of Seven Treasures and subsequently of Pearl Temple, but this idea was rejected by Zhao Bian as stated in his Stories of Shu Commandery.

According to Chen Shou's Accounts of Venerable Men and Ancient Affairs of Yizhou (3rd century), apart from "stalagmites", these stones were also given names such as "eyes of the western sea", (Note: Eyes of the western sea (Chinese: 西海之眼; pinyin: Xīhǎi zhī yǎn; Sichuanese romanization: Si^{1} Hai^{3} Chï^{1} Ien^{3})) "sacred altar of Yufu", (Note: Sacred altar of Yufu (traditional Chinese: 魚鳧仙壇; simplified Chinese: 鱼凫仙坛; pinyin: Yúfú xiāntán; Sichuanese romanization: Ü^{2} Fu^{5} Sien^{1} T'an^{2}; Japanese: 魚鳬仙壇, romanized: Sakana keri Sen dan)) "stone gate of the five warriors", (Note: Stone gate of the five warriors (traditional Chinese: 五丁石門; simplified Chinese: 五丁石门; pinyin: Wǔdīng shímén; Sichuanese romanization: U^{3} Tin^{1} Shï^{5} Men^{2})) "stone rhinoceroses", (Note: Stone rhinoceroses (Chinese: 沈犀石; pinyin: Chén xī shí; Sichuanese romanization: Ch'en^{2} Shi^{1} Shï^{5})) and "towers of the imperial consort of Shu". (Note: Towers of the imperial consort of Shu (traditional Chinese: 蜀妃闕; simplified Chinese: 蜀妃阙; pinyin: Shǔfēi què; Sichuanese romanization: Shu^{5} Fe^{1} Ch'üe^{5}))

After traveling to Chengdu in the 12th century, Lu You wrote in his Brush Notes from the Study of an Old, Learned Man: "The 'stalagmites' in Chengdu are not similar in shape to bamboo shoots, (Note: 石筍 literally means "stone bamboo shoots".) but are made of stacked stones. The assertion of the existence of the so-called 'eyes of the sea' is verifiable. Green gems are still to be found today."

Lin Ganqiu of Chengdu Daily was inclined to believe that these standing stones were not the foundation, but situated next to the castle and later the church.

== See also ==
- Ba–Shu culture
- Cross Temple, Fangshan – temple in Beijing used during different periods by Buddhists and East Syriac Christians
- Daqin Pagoda – remnant of a purported East Syriac church or Daqin temple from the Tang dynasty in modern-day Xi'an
