= The Lost Geopoetic Horizon of Li Jieren =

2015 book by Kenny Ng

The Lost Geopoetic Horizon of Li Jieren: The Crisis of Writing Chengdu in Revolutionary China is a 2015 non-fiction book by Kenny Ng, published by Brill Publishers.

The author discusses how historical developments in Chengdu affected Li Jieren's stories.

According to the author, Li Jieren had nativist views favoring Sichuan province.

== Background ==
Ng wrote a PhD thesis at Harvard University, which was presented in 2004. This thesis was reworked into this book.

== Synopsis ==
The book examines the life and literary work of Li Jieren (1891–1962), particularly focusing on his regional writing about Chengdu (capital of Sichuan Province) through the period spanning the late Qing, the Republican era, and into the early years of the People's Republic, with particular attention to how his novels negotiate local memory, geography, and revolutionary change.

Ng analyses Li Jieren's river-novel trilogy—Ripples on Dead Water (also known as Ripple on Stagnant Water), Before the Tempest, and The Great Wave—as well as Li's revisions of these works under Communist rule.

== Major Themes ==
1. Geopoetics and Place-Writing Ng introduces a “geopoetic horizon”—his term to describe Li Jieren's engagement with geographical space (especially Chengdu and its environs) in literary form, how place shapes memory and identity, and how writers negotiate between the local and the national.
2. Historical Imagination vs Official Memory The book contrasts Li's representations of past events (such as the 1911 Revolution in Chengdu) with official, revolutionary narratives. Li's works preserve local sensibilities, complexities, ambivalences, and often resist or complicate the teleological narrative of national revolution.
3. Rewriting under Political Pressure A significant portion of the study is devoted to how Li Jieren revised his works after the founding of the People's Republic of China (1950s), including changes to characterizations, representations of revolution, and the insertion of ideological conformity—while still retaining, in Ng's view, traces of Li's original geopoetic concerns.
4. Gender, Desire, and Social Class Themes of female desire, forbidden love, family relations, gentry vs peasantry, and the tensions between tradition and modernity are explored in Li's novels, both in their original forms and in their later revisions.
5. The Crisis of Writing "Home" Ng frames Li's struggle as one of trying to write “home”—that is, representing his native place and its memories and people—in an era marked by revolution, nationalism, ideology, and modernizing impulses that often demand simplification, alignment with a national project, or suppression of local complexity.

== Structure ==
The book is organized into six chapters plus a conclusion, roughly as follows:

- Chapter 1 (“Introduction: The Man, The Place, The Novel”) – sets out Li Jieren's biography, literary context, the idea of geopoetics, and Ng's methodology.
- Chapter 2 (“From Tianhui to Chengdu: Geopoetics and Historical Imagination”) – examines spatial dynamics in Ripples on Dead Water, especially the contrast between rural/town periphery and city center.
- Chapter 3 (“No Place for Good Memories: Chengdu 1911”) – focuses on the 1911 Revolution events around Chengdu, and Li's portrayal of memory and conflicting historical accounts.
- Chapter 4 (“Tempest in a Teacup: Local Memorial Dynamics”) – explores local responses to anti-foreignism, popular sentiment, spectacle and violence and how these are represented in Before the Tempest.
- Chapter 5 (“Love in the Time of Revolution”) – looks at personal/private life, especially the stories of forbidden love and domestic relations in The Great Wave, and how these interact with political upheaval.
- Chapter 6 (“The Road to Perdition”) – examines Li's rewrites under Communist rule, ideological pressure, revisions of character and narrative to align with new political demands.
- Conclusion – reflects on what is lost and what survives in Li's geopoetic horizon; how literary history and memory might be re-interpreted through such works.

== Reception ==
Yuehtsen Juliette Chung (Chinese: 鐘月岑; pinyin: Zhōng Yuècén) of National Tsing-Hua University stated that the book "makes a significant contribution" in its field.

Veg stated that the book demonstrates "the most engaging kind of doctoral research". Veg concluded that the work "will be of great interest to" people interested in Li Jieren's works and people interested in the history of the Republic of China period and the literary work of that period. Veg gave praise to the book's illustrations, with particular favor to those of Tongsu Huabao.
