= Marie-Julien Dunand =

French Catholic prelate in China (1841–1915)

Monsignor Marie-Julien Dunand
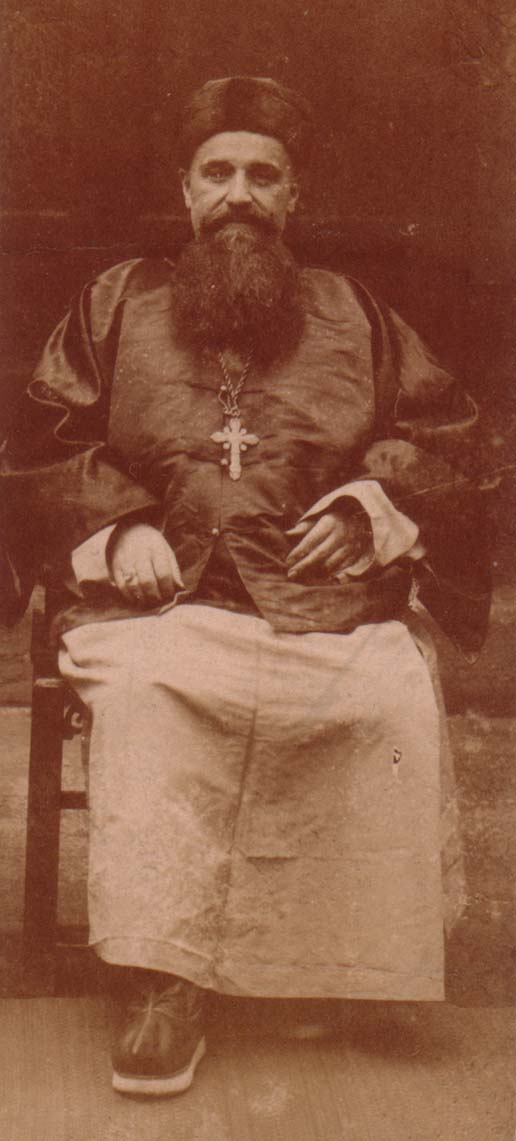
- Church: Catholic Church
- Diocese: Apostolic Vicariate of North-western Szechwan
- Installed: 1893
- Term ended: 1915
- Predecessor: Annet-Théophile Pinchon
- Successor: Jacques-Victor-Marius Rouchouse

Orders
- Ordination: 19 September 1866

Personal details
- Born: 23 January 1841 Saint-Jean-de-Belleville, Tarentaise, France
- Died: 4 August 1915 (aged 74) Chengdu, Sichuan, China

Marie-Julien Dunand (23 January 1841 – 4 August 1915), also known in Chinese as Du Ang (Chinese: 杜昂; pinyin: Dù Áng), was a French priest who was the Catholic apostolic vicar of North-Western Szechwan from 1893 to 1915. He was a recipient of the Legion of Honour.

== Biography ==
=== Early life ===
Dunand was born in Saint-Jean-de-Belleville on 23 January 1841. He was ordained a priest in 1863 and worked as a teacher and vicar in Albertville for about 5 years. He joined the Paris Foreign Missions Society in 1868, left for China in 1869 and arrived in 1870. In China, Dunand first worked as a missionary, but was soon nominated to direct the seminary at Muping, Baoxing, Ya'an.

=== Apostolic vicar ===
In 1886, Annet-Théophile Pinchon, the Apostolic Vicar of North-western Sichuan, appointed Dunand to be the vicar general in charge of Chongqingzhou (崇庆州), near Chengdu. After Pinchon's death in 1891, Dunand directed the mission for two years. In 1893, he was appointed the Apostolic Vicar of North-western Szechwan and also became the titular bishop of Caloe.

==== Anti-missionary riots ====
In 1895, an anti-missionary riot broke out in Chengdu, which destroyed the episcopal residence, the cathedral, and other oratories around Chengdu. Dunand was injured and fled. Different sources give conflicting accounts about Dunand's injury: the France-Asian Research Institute (IRFA) said Dunand almost died, but Wang Anming from Chengdu Folk Culture Research Association (成都民俗文化研究会) asserted that Dunand was only slightly injured.

Following the riot, Dunand directed Jacques-Victor-Marius Rouchouse to build the current Cathedral of the Immaculate Conception. Additionally, he planned for the construction of Annunciation Seminary in Bailu, Pengzhou, a location farther from Chengdu, in response to the violent incident.

The apostolic vicariate under Dunand saw local uprisings in 1896, in 1900 during the Boxer Rebellion, and in 1902, in which Dunand had to request the aid of a French gunboat. In 1898, Dunand was named a chevalier (knight) of the Legion of Honour for his "eminent services rendered in the Far East and inestimable services rendered for the Lyonnese Mission in 1896" by Félix Faure. (Note: Original text: Motif: Eminents services rendus en Extrême-Orient et inestimables services rendus à la Mission Lyonnaise en 1896. Fait-à Paris le 25 Mai 1898. Signé: FÉLIXF-AURE, Le Grd Chancelier: Auerstadt Davout. [sic])

=== Death ===
Dunand died in Chengdu in 1915. The French and British consuls as well as Chinese civil and military representatives attended his funeral. He was buried at Mopan Mountain (磨盘山) near Chengdu, where Saint Gabriel-Taurin Dufresse was also buried. He was succeeded by Jacques-Victor-Marius Rouchouse as the apostolic vicar.

== Legacy ==
=== Charity ===
According to the French-Asia Research Institute (IRFA), Dunand worked for the education of youth and the relief of the sick during his leadership. He opened an orphanage, a hospital and a hospice for the poor and entrusted them to the Franciscan Sisters of Mary. He also opened a school for boys, which was entrusted to the Marist Brothers.

=== Architecture ===
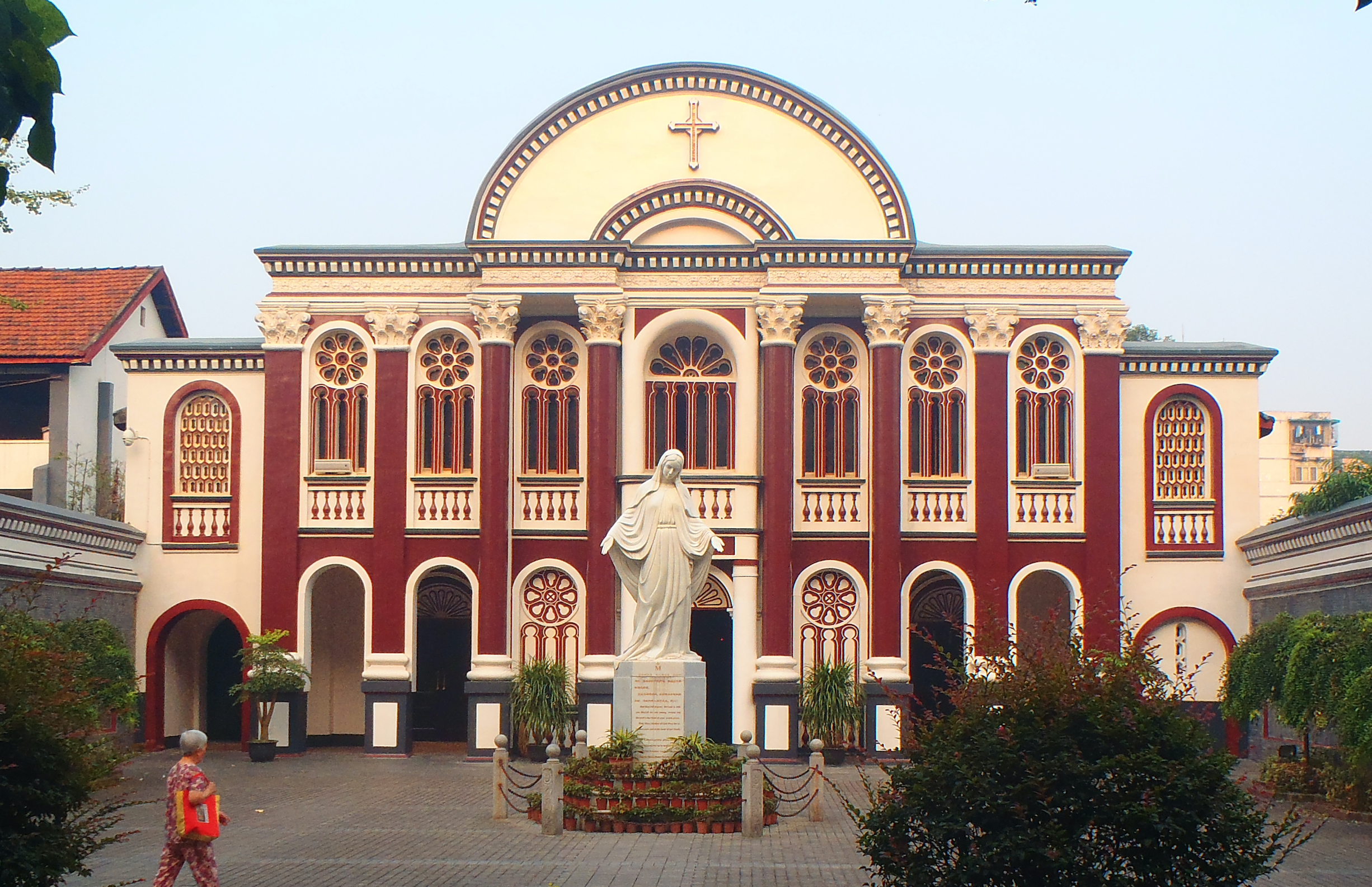
Immaculate Conception Cathedral, Chengdu, in 2013.

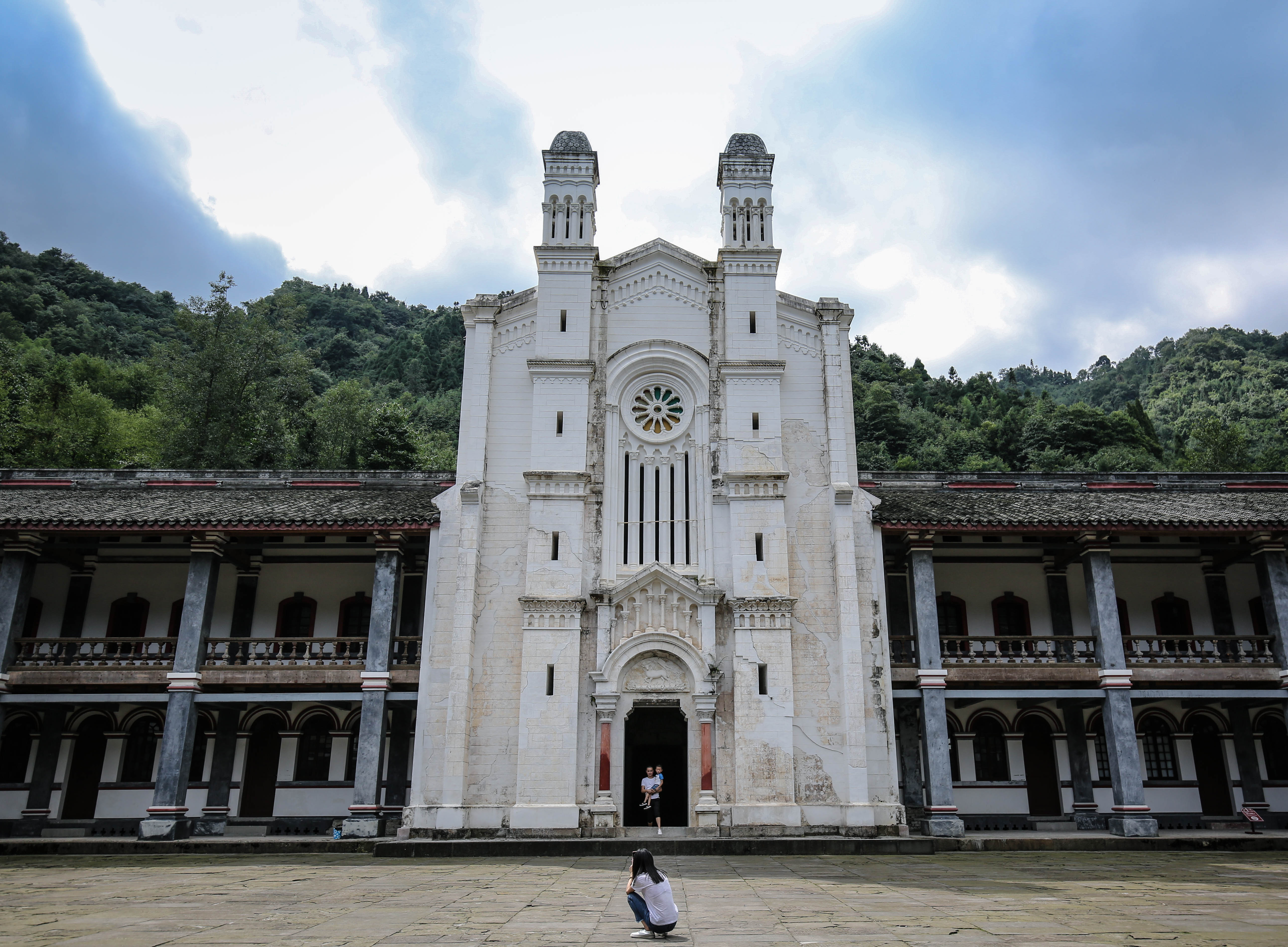
Annunciation Seminary, Bailu, in 2017.

Dunand initiated the construction of the Immaculate Conception Cathedral, Chengdu and the Annunciation Seminary, Bailu. The cathedral and the attached episcopal residence were completed in 1904 and remains in operation. The seminary was completed in 1907, abandoned in 1949, collapsed in the 2008 Sichuan earthquake, and rebuilt in 2016. Both the cathedral and the seminary sites are Major Historical and Cultural Sites Protected at the National Level of China.

== See also ==
- Catholic Church in Sichuan
- Annunciation Seminary, Bailu
- Immaculate Conception Cathedral, Chengdu

Catholic Church titles
| Preceded by | — TITULAR — Bishop of Caloe; 21 August 1893 — 4 August 1915 | Succeeded by Ángel Diego y Carbajal |
| Preceded by Annet-Théophile Pinchon | Vicar Apostolic of North-western Sichuan; 21 August 1893 — 4 August 1915 | Succeeded by Jacques-Victor-Marius Rouchouse |
