= Sun and Immortal Birds =

Ancient Chinese artifact

Sun and Immortal Birds Gold Ornament
- 太阳神鸟金饰
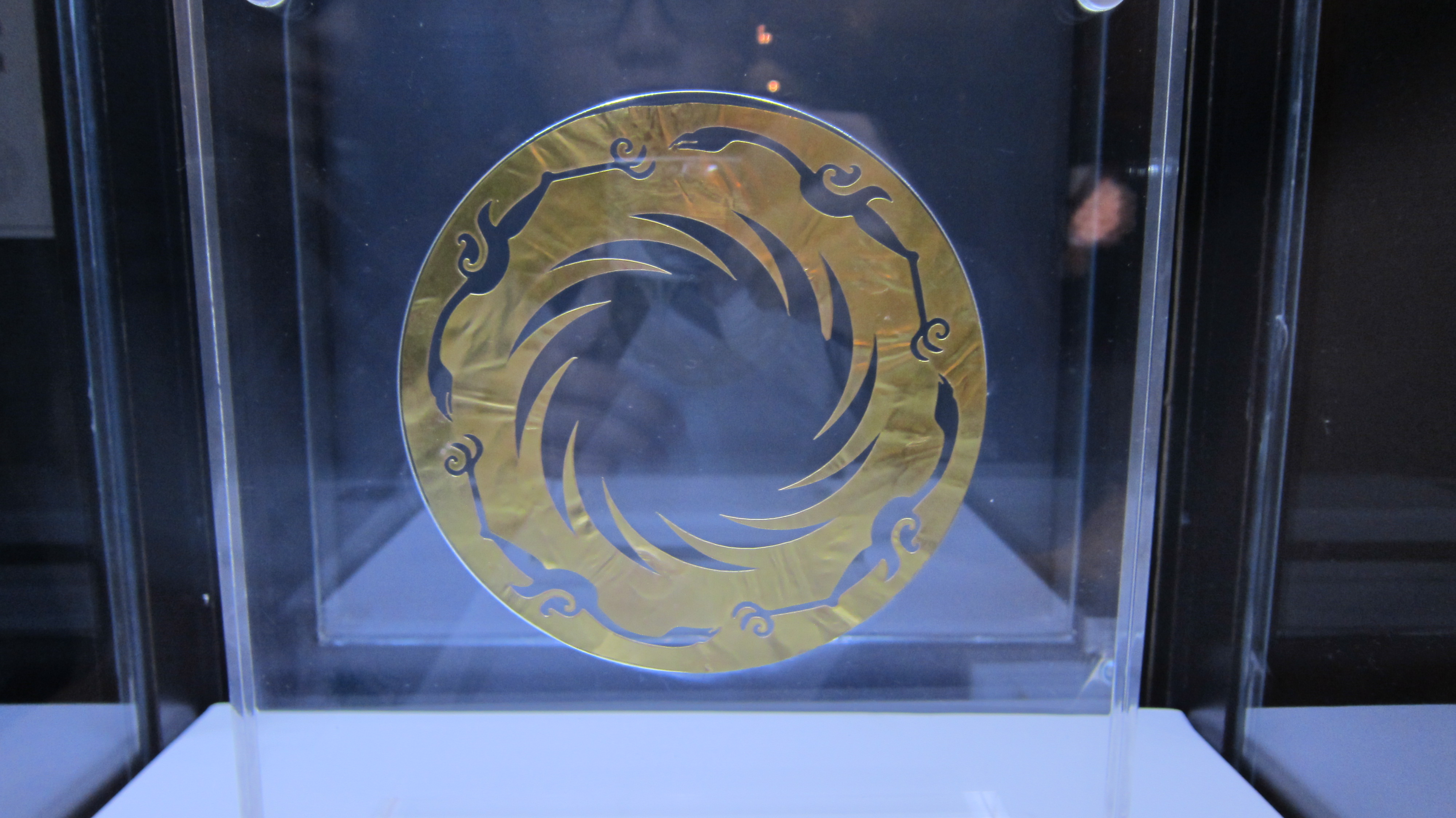
- Material: Gold
- Size: 12.5 cm in diameter
- Weight: 20 grams
- Created: c. 1125 BC
- Discovered: 2001; Sanxingdui
- Present location: Jinsha Museum, Chengdu

The Sun and Immortal Birds Gold Ornament (Chinese: 太阳神鸟金饰; also known as the Golden Sun Birds) is an ancient artifact unearthed in 2001 at Jinsha archaeological site located in the city of Chengdu, Sichuan Province, China. The piece dates back to the late Sanxingdui period (around 1200–1050 BCE), and is now located in the Jinsha Museum, Chengdu.

The ancient artifact is a ring-shaped piece of foil, made of nearly pure gold. The pattern consists of four birds, flying in the same counterclockwise direction, located around the perimeter. The center is a sun pattern with twelve points. It is 12.5 cm in diameter, with a 5.29 cm inner diameter. It has a thickness of 0.02 cm, and weighs 20 grams.

== Use as logo ==
The Sun and Immortal Birds motif is used as a logo to represent China's cultural heritage. In 2011, the city of Chengdu selected the Sun and Immortal Birds motif as the design for its logo.

The Sun and Immortal Birds motif is also featured on the coat of arms of Joseph Tang Yuange, Roman Catholic Bishop of Chengdu since 2016, as well as on the coat of arms of the Diocese of Chengdu. The sun bird was also used as the elements of the 2021 FISU World University Games in Chengdu.

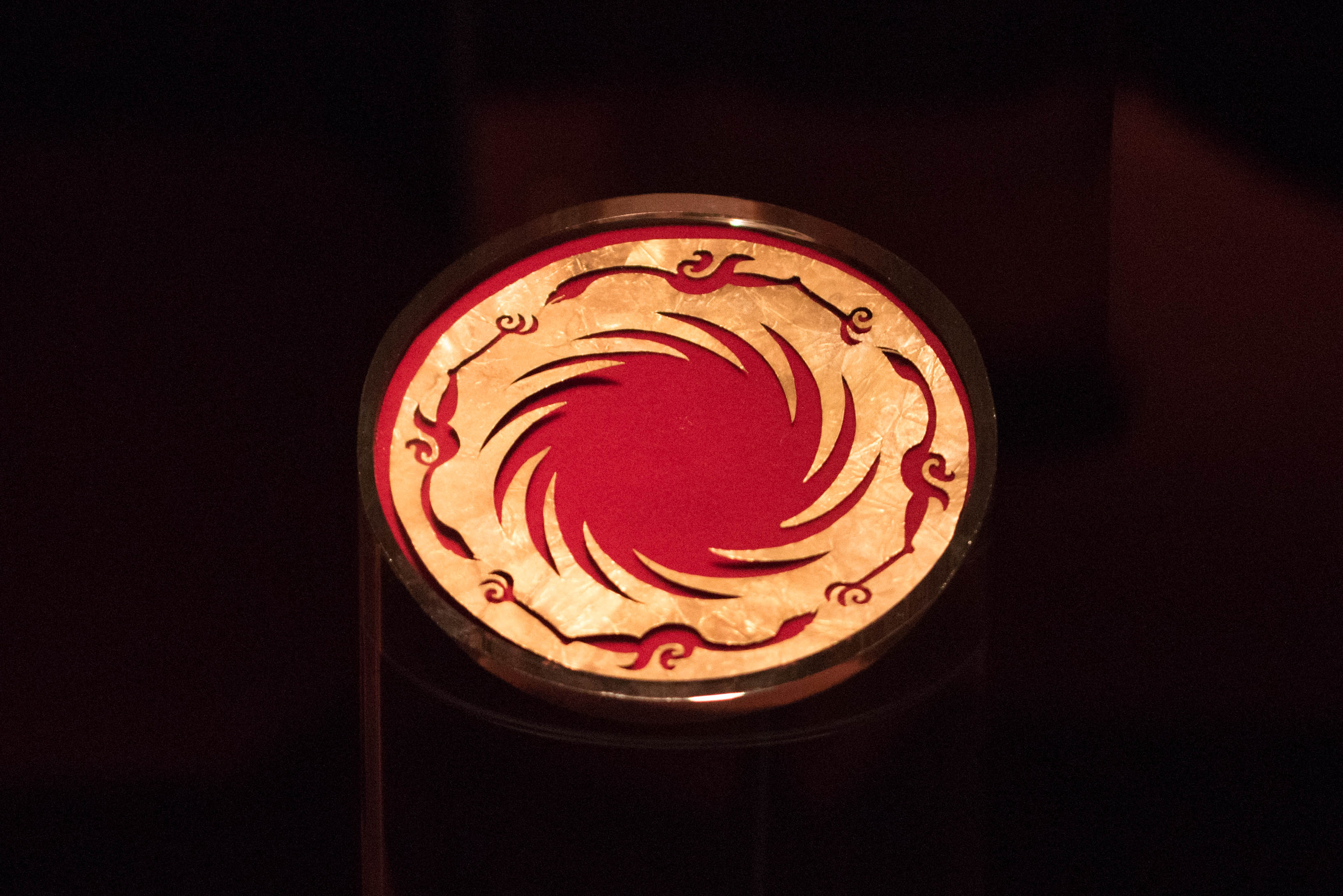
Golden Sun Bird in the museum exposition

Coat of arms of Bishop Joseph Tang Yuange

Coat of arms of the Diocese of Chengdu

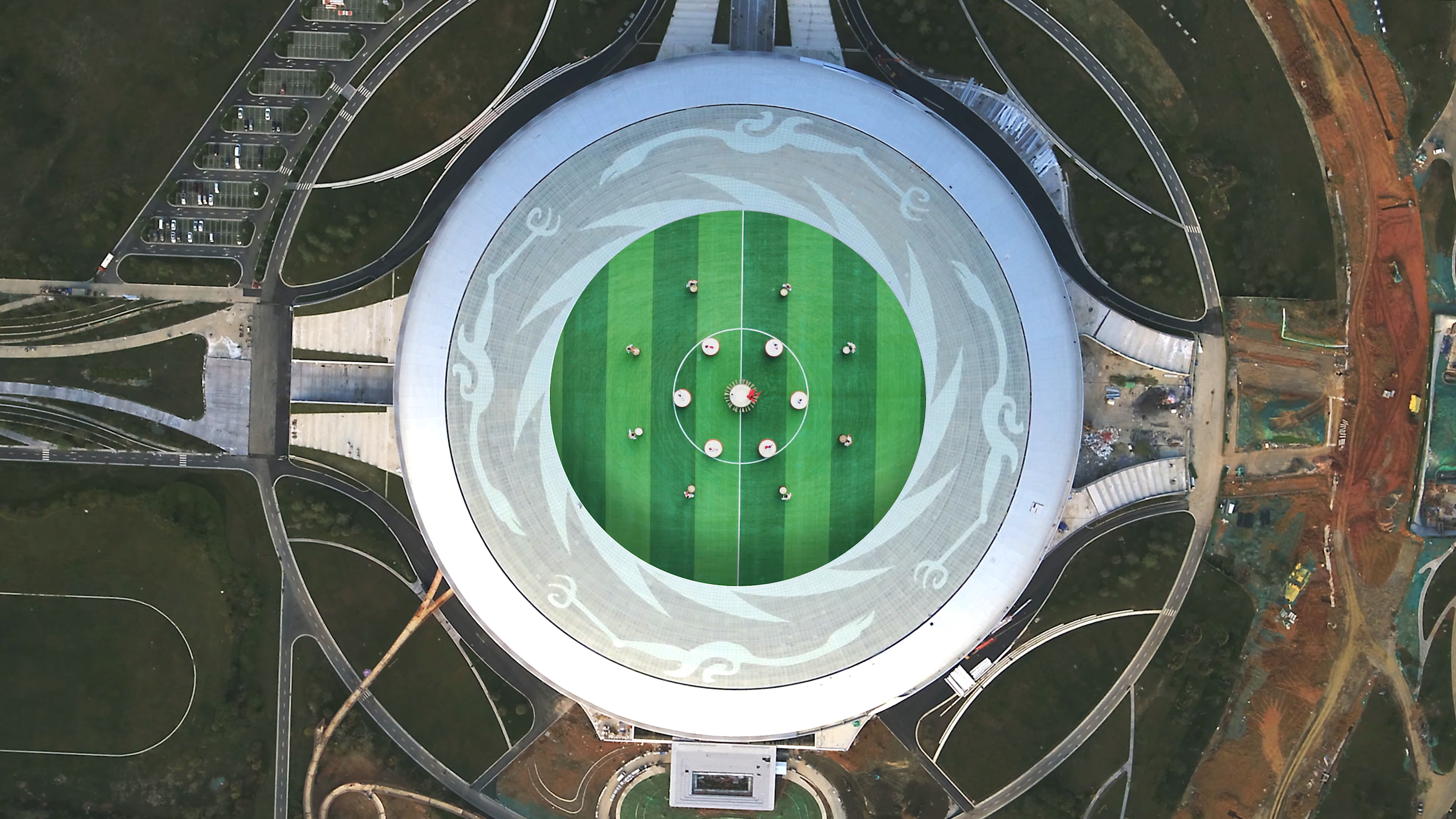
Dong'an Lake Stadium, the main venue of the 2021 Summer World University Games, with a giant sun bird design on the roof

== See also ==
- List of Chinese cultural relics forbidden to be exhibited abroad
