= Augustine Zhao Rong =

Chinese Catholic priest and saint

Saint Augustine Zhao Rong
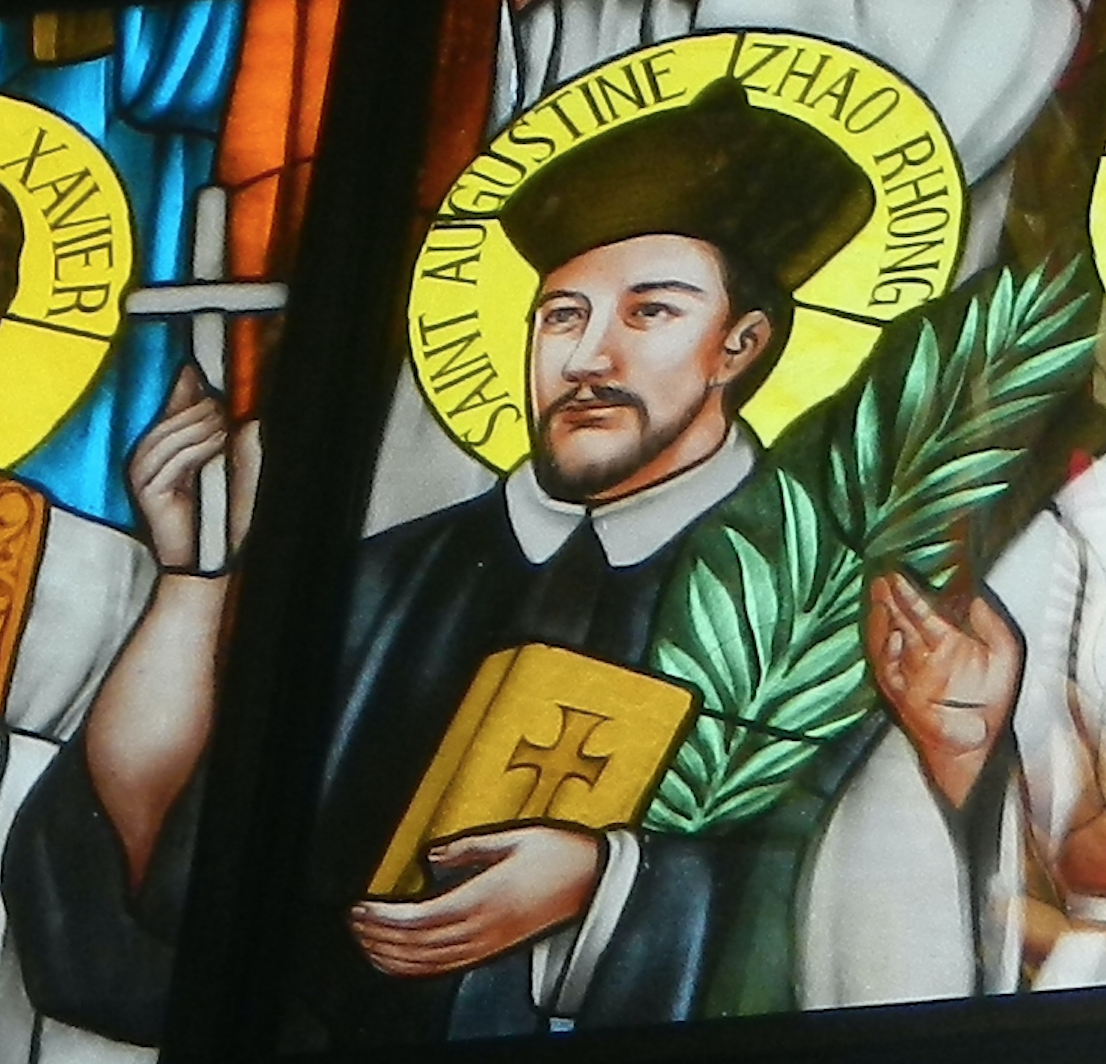
- Saint Augustine Zhao, Santo Cristo and Saint Andrew Kim Taegon Parish Church, Bocaue, Bulacan, Philippines.
- Born: 1746; Wuchuan, Guizhou, Qing China
- Died: 1815 (aged 68–69); Chengdu, Sichuan, Qing China
- Cause of death: Martyrdom
- Beatified: 27 May 1893 by Pope Leo XIII
- Canonized: 1 October 2000 by Pope John Paul II
- Feast: 9 July

Augustine Zhao Rong (Chinese name: 趙榮; 赵荣; Zhào Róng; 1746–1815) was a Chinese Catholic priest who was martyred in 1815. He was canonized by Pope John Paul II on October 1, 2000, as one of the 120 Martyrs of China.

== Life ==
He was born in 1746 in Wuchuan county of Guizhou. He joined the imperial army of the Qing dynasty when he was 20.

During the anti-Christian persecutions in the 18th century, he was at one point put in charge of guarding Christian prisoners. In particular, in 1785, he guarded Father (later bishop) Gabriel-Taurin Dufresse when the latter was under arrest and being taken to Beijing. Zhao Rong was converted through his contact with Father Gabriel. When Father Gabriel was later released from prison, he baptized Zhao Rong, who received the name 'Augustine'.

Augustine wanted to become a priest himself and received training to become a priest. He was ordained only five years after his baptism by François Pottier, Apostolic Vicar of Szechwan. He was the first Chinese-born diocesan priest. Augustine worked as a priest and was known for bringing many people to convert. He was sent to work in Yunnan. In the last year of his life, he was in charge of all Catholics in the counties of Guan Xian, Jin Tang, and Wen Jiang in western Sichuan Province.

During the reign of the Jiaqing Emperor a new wave of persecution occurred against Christians in China. Augustine was arrested, tortured and ordered to renounce his faith. Augustine refused and he died in prison from beatings in the winter of 1815.

== Canonization ==
He was beatified on May 27, 1893, by Pope Leo XIII and canonized along with other martyrs of China on October 1, 2000, by Pope John Paul II. He was the first Chinese priest in history to be martyred and the group of martyrs canonized in 2000 were also named 'Augustine Zhao Rong and companions'.

== See also ==
- Christianity in Guizhou
- Catholic Church in Sichuan
