= Henri Pinault =

French bishop (1904–1987)

- Bishop of Chengdu
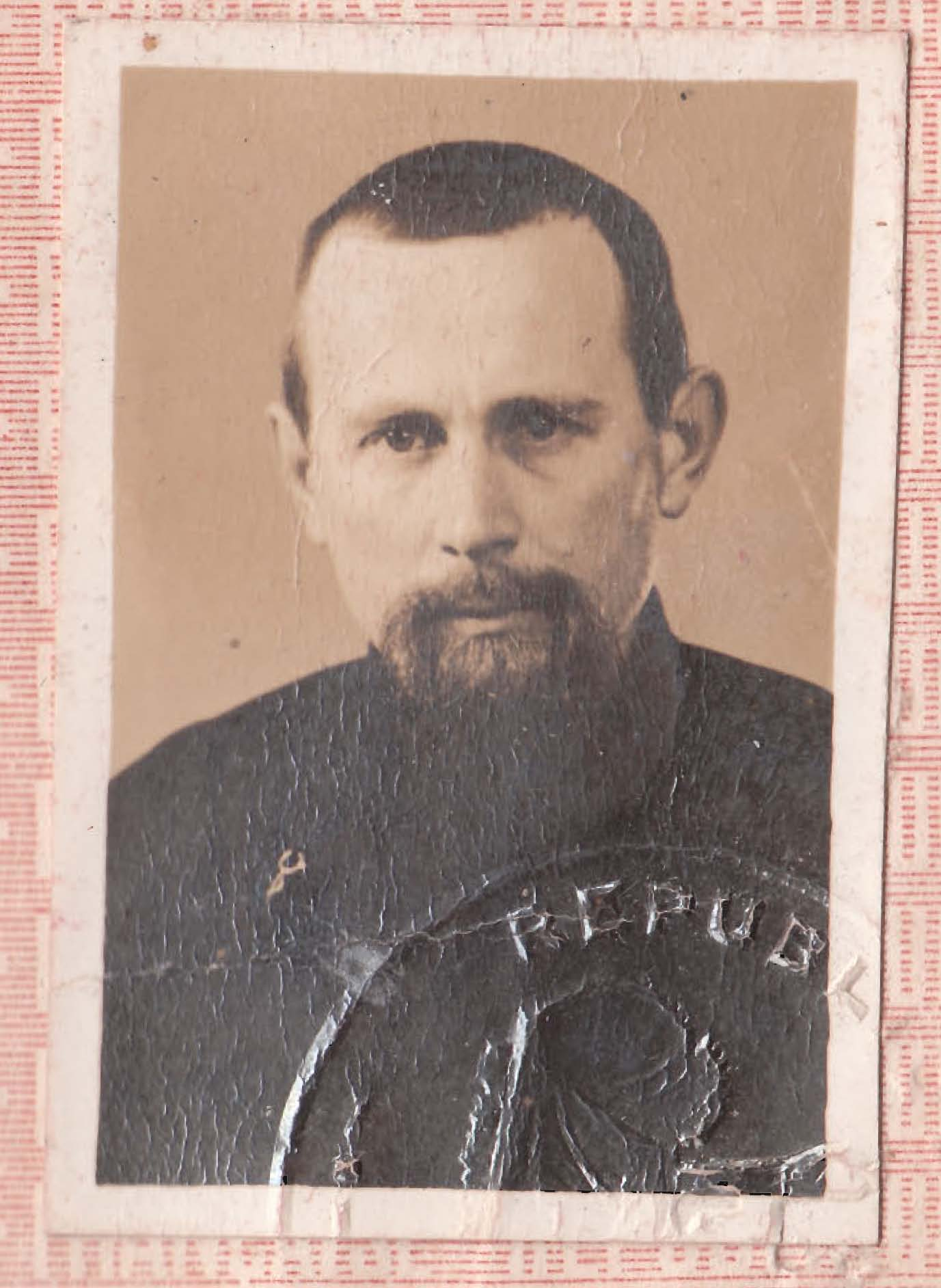
- Henri Pinault's 1945 passport photo.
- Church: Catholic Church
- Archdiocese: Chongqing
- Diocese: Chengdu
- See: Diocese of Chengdu
- Installed: 14 July 1949
- Term ended: 1983
- Predecessor: Jacques-Victor-Marius Rouchouse
- Successor: None

Orders
- Consecration: 21 September 1949

Personal details
- Born: Henri Pinault; 7 September 1904 Tinténiac, France
- Died: 24 February 1987 (aged 82) Évran, France
- Buried: Évran, Côtes-d'Armor, Brittany, France
- Denomination: Roman Catholicism
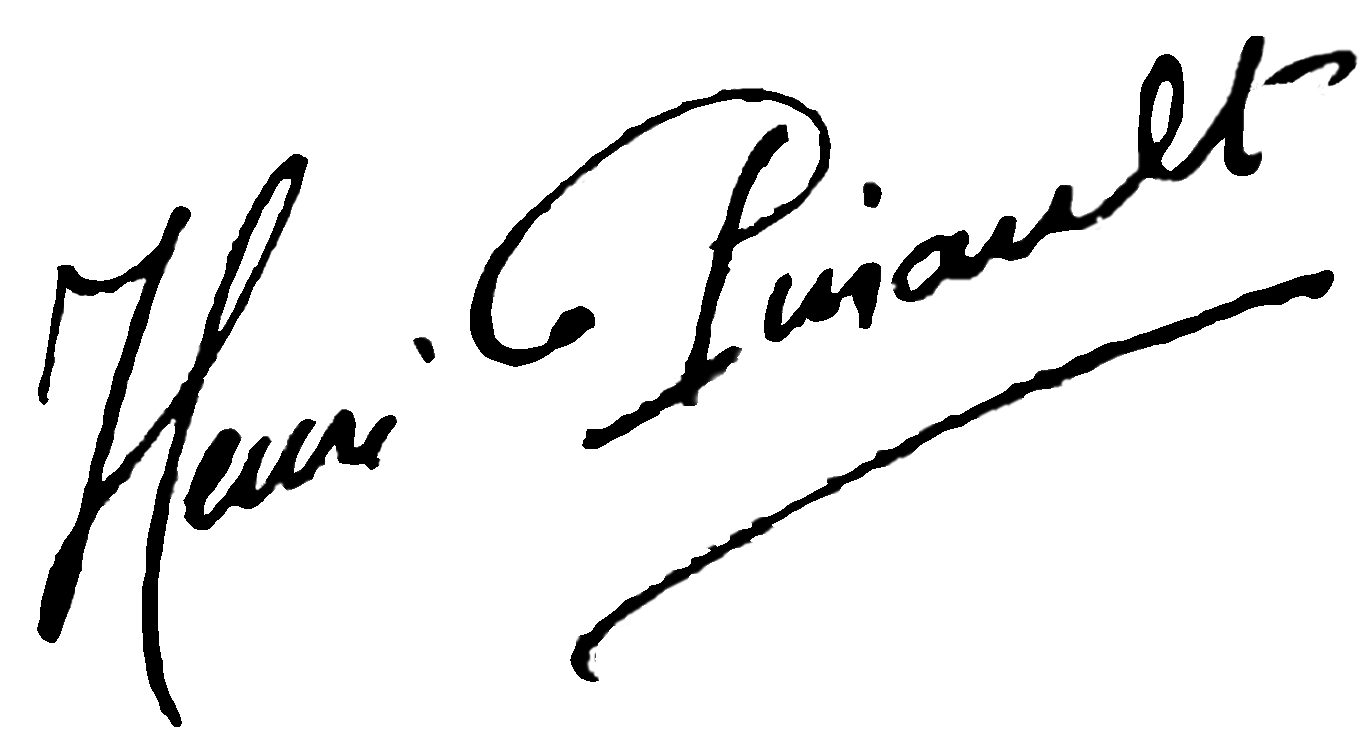
- Signature

Henri-Marie-Ernest-Désiré Pinault (French pronunciation: [ɑ̃ʁi maʁi ɛʁnɛst deziʁe pino]; 7 September 1904 – 24 February 1987) was the Roman Catholic bishop of Chengdu from 1949 until 1983, four years before his death.

== Early life ==
Pinault was born on 7 September 1904 into a family of farmers in Tinténiac deanery in Trévérien commune, Ille-et-Vilaine department in Brittany in northwestern France. In 1905, the Pinault family settled on a farm in Évran commune in the Côtes du Nord department of Brittany. Pinault had his primary school studies in Évran and his secondary schooling at the Cordeliers in Dinan. The Pinaults were devout Roman Catholics and Henri had an uncle who was a priest in the Diocese of Saint-Brieuc and a cousin who was a priest in the Diocese of Rennes. In 1922, Pinault was ordained as a priest, and on 29 June 1929 he received his appointment as a Priest of Paris Foreign Missions Society.

== Sichuan ==
On 15 September 1929, Father Pinault embarked on his mission to Chengdu, capital of Sichuan in western China. When he first arrived in China the country was in turmoil. After spending several months in Chengdu, he was sent to Bazhou to undergo language training. Father Pinault took the Chinese name Peng Daochuan (traditional Chinese: 彭道傳; simplified Chinese: 彭道传; pinyin: Péng Dàochuán; Wade–Giles: P'eng Tao-ch'uan). The city was captured on 23 February 1933 by forces of the Chinese Communist Party during the Chinese Civil War and clergymen and Christians were forced to flee. Father Pinault found refuge with Benedictine monks in Chongqing. In 1934, Father Pinault was appointed Supérieur du Probatorium at Hebachang, where he organized a hospice in 1942. In 1945, Father Pinault departed from Hebachang and replaced the deceased pastor at Tsong-Kin-Tcheou.

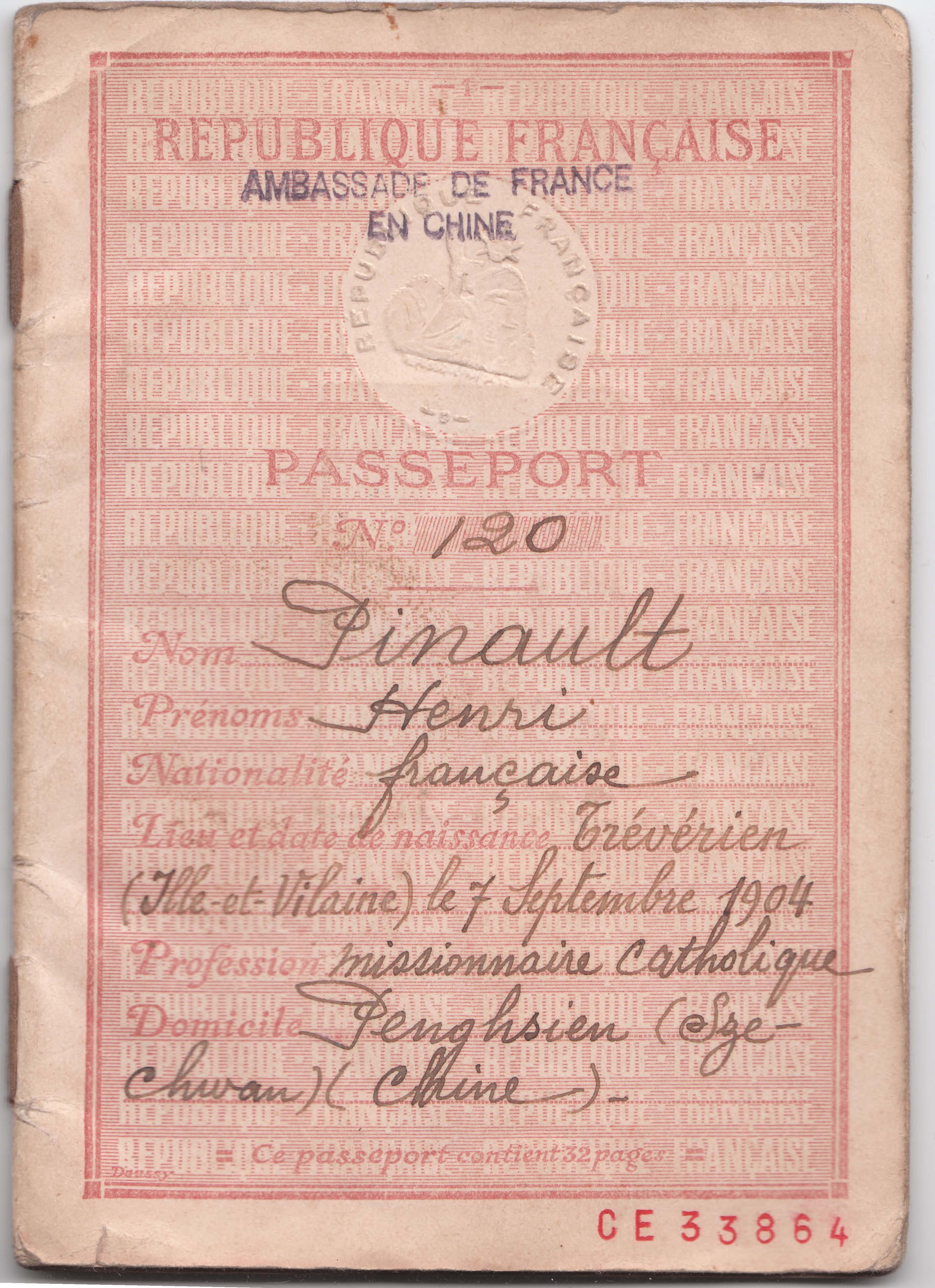
Cover of Henri Pinault's 1945 French passport issued in China

On 14 July 1949, Pinault was appointed to replace the late Jacques-Victor-Marius Rouchouse as Bishop of Chengdu, the highest post in the Diocese of Chengdu in the ecclesiastical province of Chongqing; Pinault received his episcopal ordination on 21 September 1949. On 28 December 1949, the city of Chengdu was captured by communist forces. In order to protect his fellow clergy members, Pinault took personal responsibility for the ownership of all church property. This act placed him at risk as Communist Party administrators placed heavy taxes on religious properties and imprisoned clergy members. Officials ruled that Pinault was unable to pay his "debts" and threw him in prison in early 1952, where he underwent repeated interrogations. Finally, Pinault was expelled from China, leaving Chengdu on 29 March 1952 and arriving in British Hong Kong on 14 April. Pinault arrived in Marseille on June 30 and shortly after visited his mother in Évran. After his departure from China, Pinault retained the title of Bishop of Chengdu, which he would hold until 1983.

== Later life and death ==
Shortly after his arrival in France, Pinault accepted an assignment as a military chaplain in the French Air Force in North Africa. On 29 December 1953, Pinault returned to France and spent time at Voreppe before relocating to Paris, working with la Mission bretonne and the ministère épiscopal de Confirmations et d'Ordinations. Pinault took part in the Second Vatican Council in Rome from 1962-1965. On his return from Rome, Pinault retired to Évran, where he lived with his mother, who died in 1975, and served neighboring parishes. In June 1980, Pinault celebrated Eucharist in Lisieux with Pope John Paul II during the Pope's pilgrimage. In 1983, Pinault retired from his position as Bishop of Chengdu and became its Bishop Emeritus; the position of Bishop of Chengdu was left vacant. In December 1986, Pinault was hospitalized at Rennes with arteritis and underwent several surgeries. He returned home to Évran on 23 February, dying on 24 February, aged 82. He is buried next to his mother in a small cemetery in Évran.

== See also ==
- Catholic Church in Sichuan
