= Immaculate Conception Cathedral, Chengdu =

Cathedral of the Immaculate Conception, Chengdu
- Ping'anqiao Catholic Church
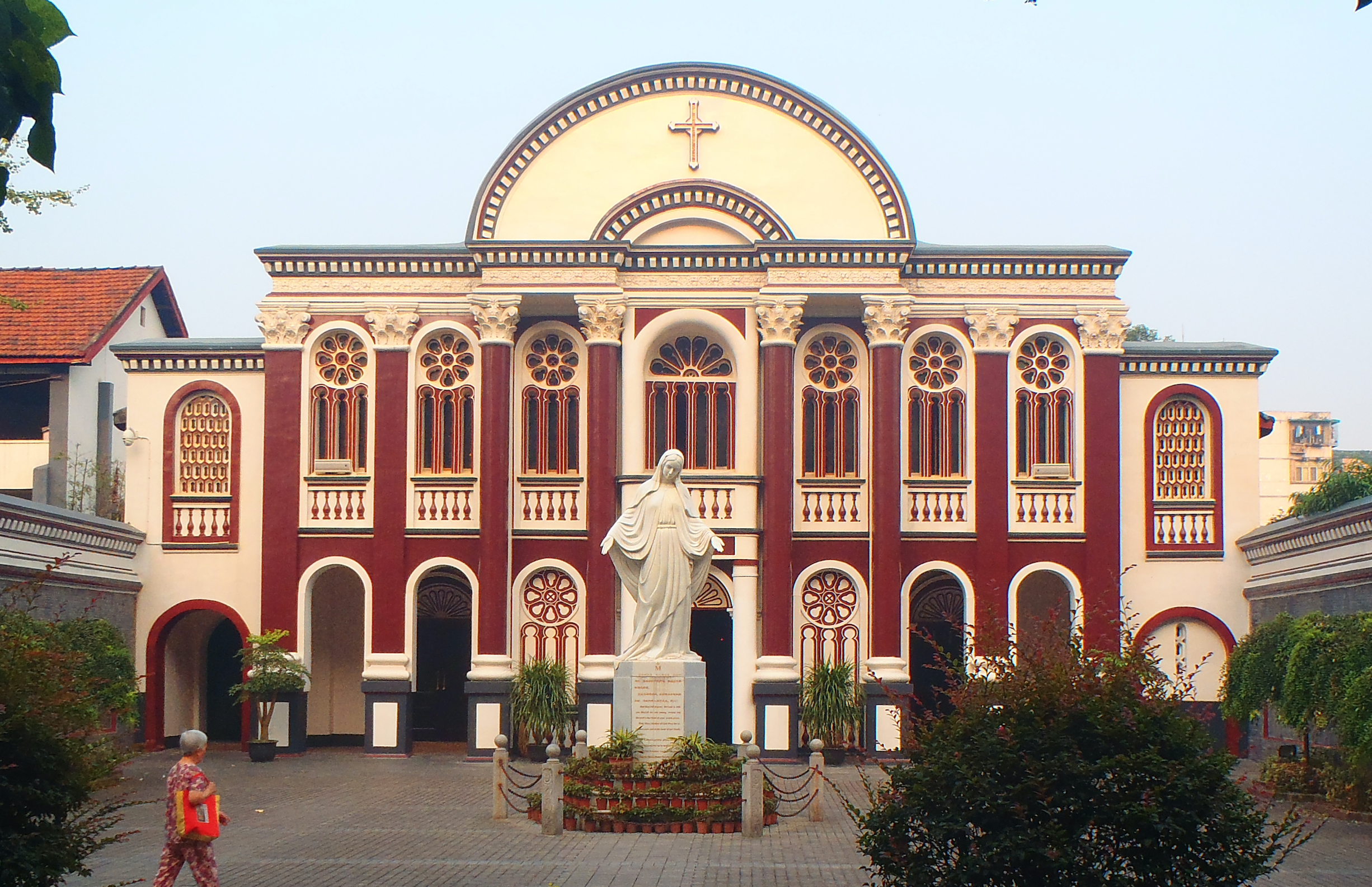
- The cathedral in 2013
- Cathedral of the Immaculate Conception, Chengdu
- 30°39′59″N 104°03′34″E
- Location: 25 Xihuamen Street, Qingyang District, Chengdu, Sichuan
- Country: China
- Denomination: Catholic Church

History
- Status: Cathedral
- Founded: 1897
- Founder: Jacques-Victor-Marius Rouchouse
- Dedication: Immaculate Conception

Architecture
- Functional status: Active
- Style: Byzantine Revival; Renaissance Revival; traditional Sichuanese style
- Groundbreaking: 1897
- Completed: 1904

Administration
- Archdiocese: Chongqing
- Diocese: Chengdu

Clergy
- Bishop: Joseph Tang Yuange

The Cathedral of the Immaculate Conception, commonly referred to as Ping'anqiao Catholic Church, is the Roman Catholic cathedral of the Diocese of Chengdu, situated on Xihuamen Street, Qingyang District, in Sichuan's capital city of Chengdu. It has been subjected to the control of the state-sanctioned Chinese Catholic Patriotic Association since 1957.

== Description ==
The construction of the cathedral started in 1897, under the supervision of Jacques-Victor-Marius Rouchouse, a French missionary of the Paris Foreign Missions Society and the first bishop of the Diocese of Chengdu, who was appointed to supervise the work by Bishop Marie-Julien Dunand. It was not completed until 1904. The English political economist Audrey Donnithorne was baptized at this cathedral after converting from Anglicanism to Roman Catholicism in 1943.

The buildings, including the cathedral, the Bishop's Office, and the Episcopal Residence, cover an area of 16,566.3 square meters and have a usable area of 8,508.5 square meters. Built in a cruciform design with a façade of neo-Byzantine style, the cathedral and its surrounding buildings constitute the Chinese character "悚" meaning "fear", representing "The beginning of wisdom is fear of the Lord" (Proverbs 9:10). The right part of the character means "rule", which represents the function of this building as a cathedral, as Jesus said in the Gospel: "Amen, I say to you, whatever you bind on earth shall be bound in heaven, and whatever you loose on earth shall be loosed in heaven" (Matthew 18:18).

== Mass times ==
English Mass is celebrated on Saturdays at 4:00pm. Service in the local language is held on Sundays, starting at the same hour.

== Gallery ==
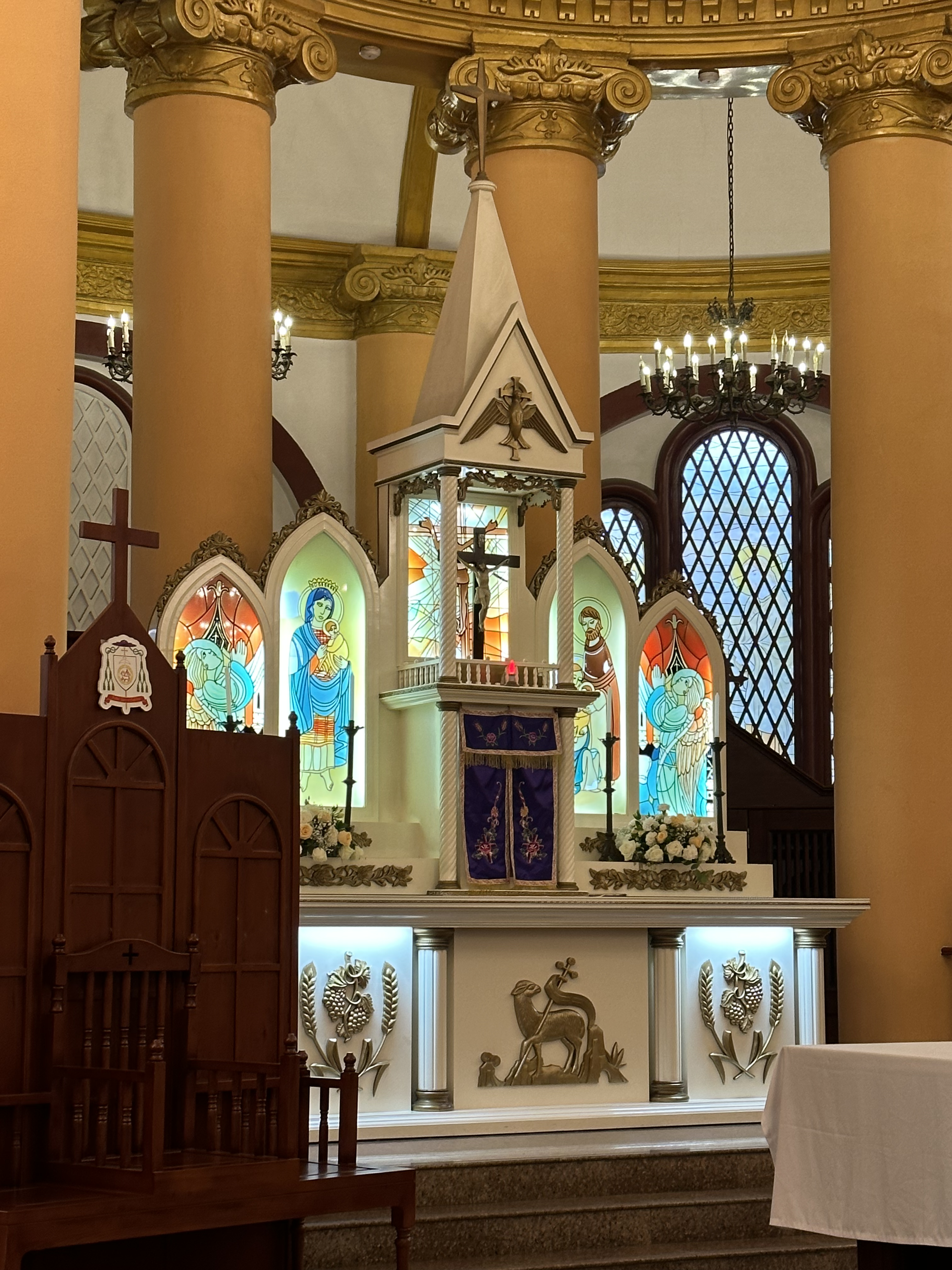
High altar

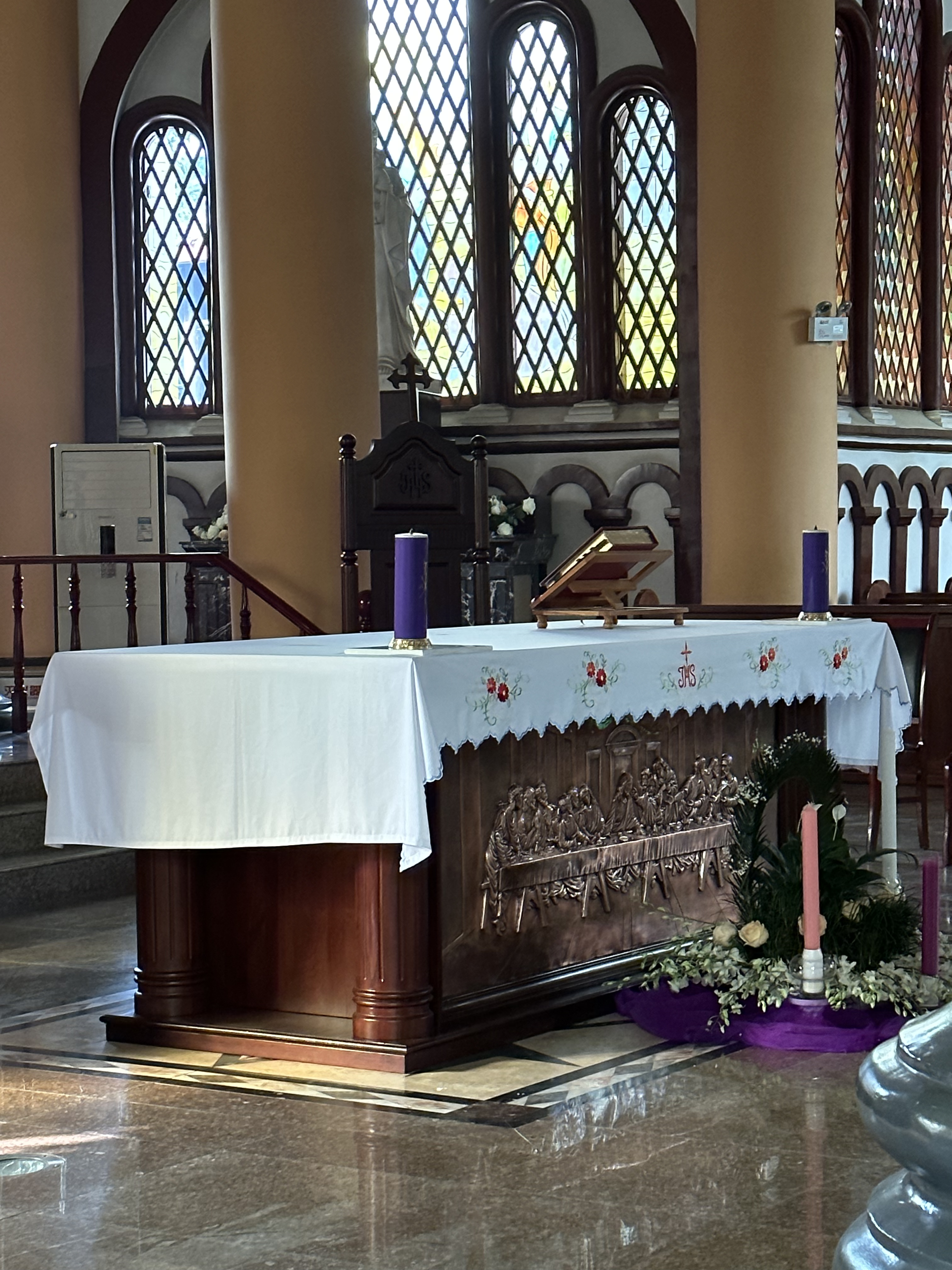
Low altar

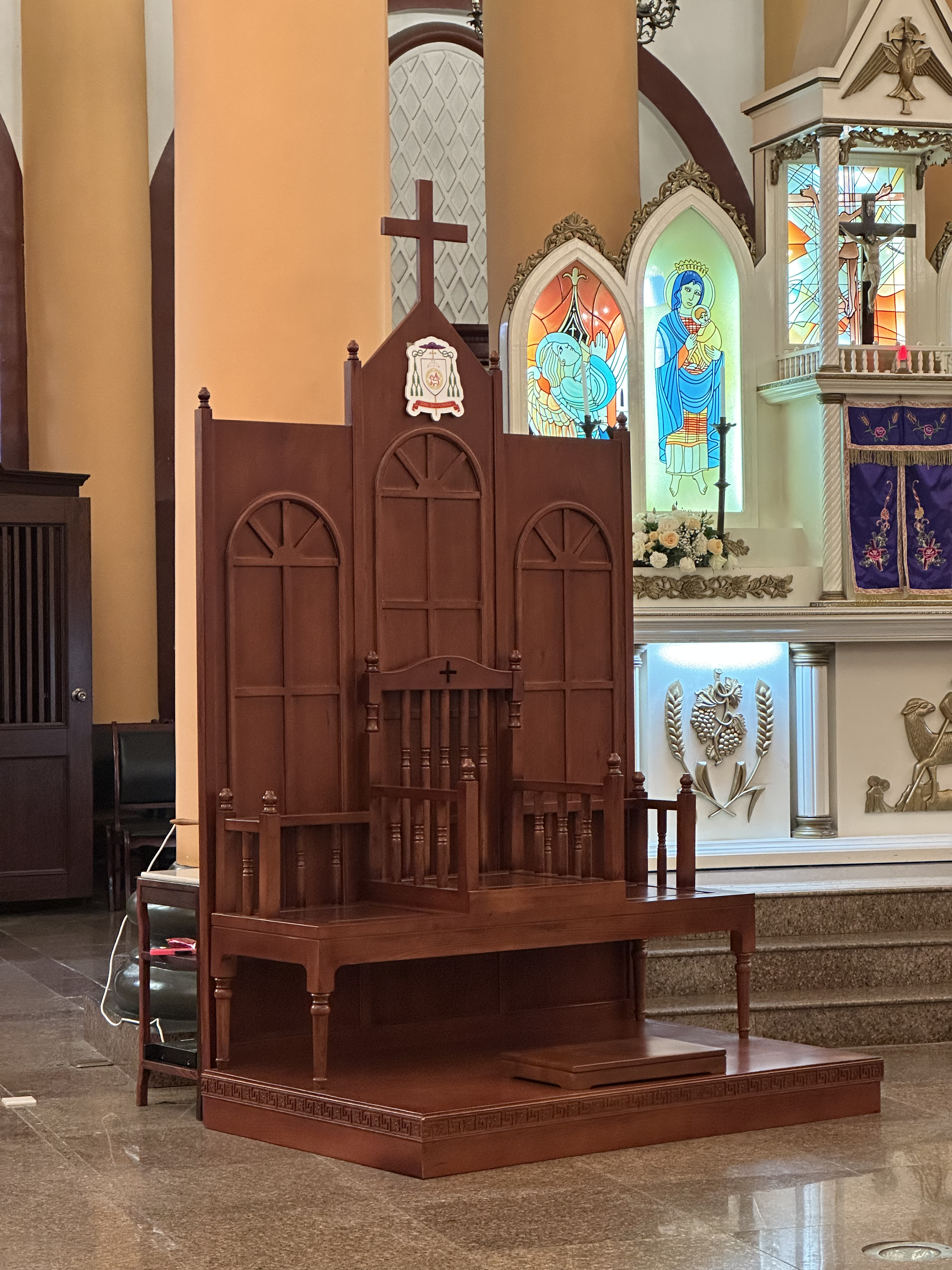
The bishop's seat

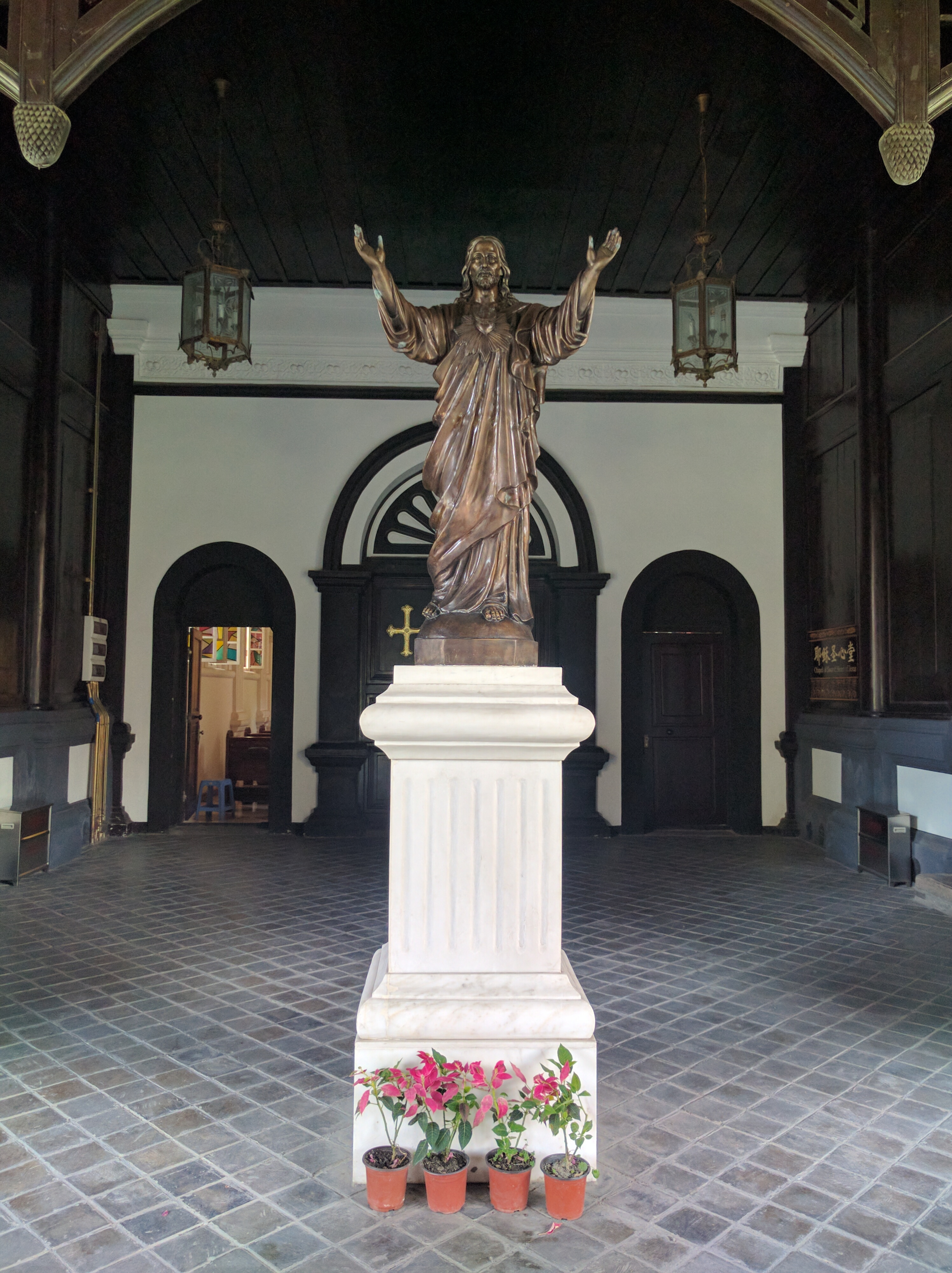
Entrance to the chapel of the Sacred Heart of Jesus

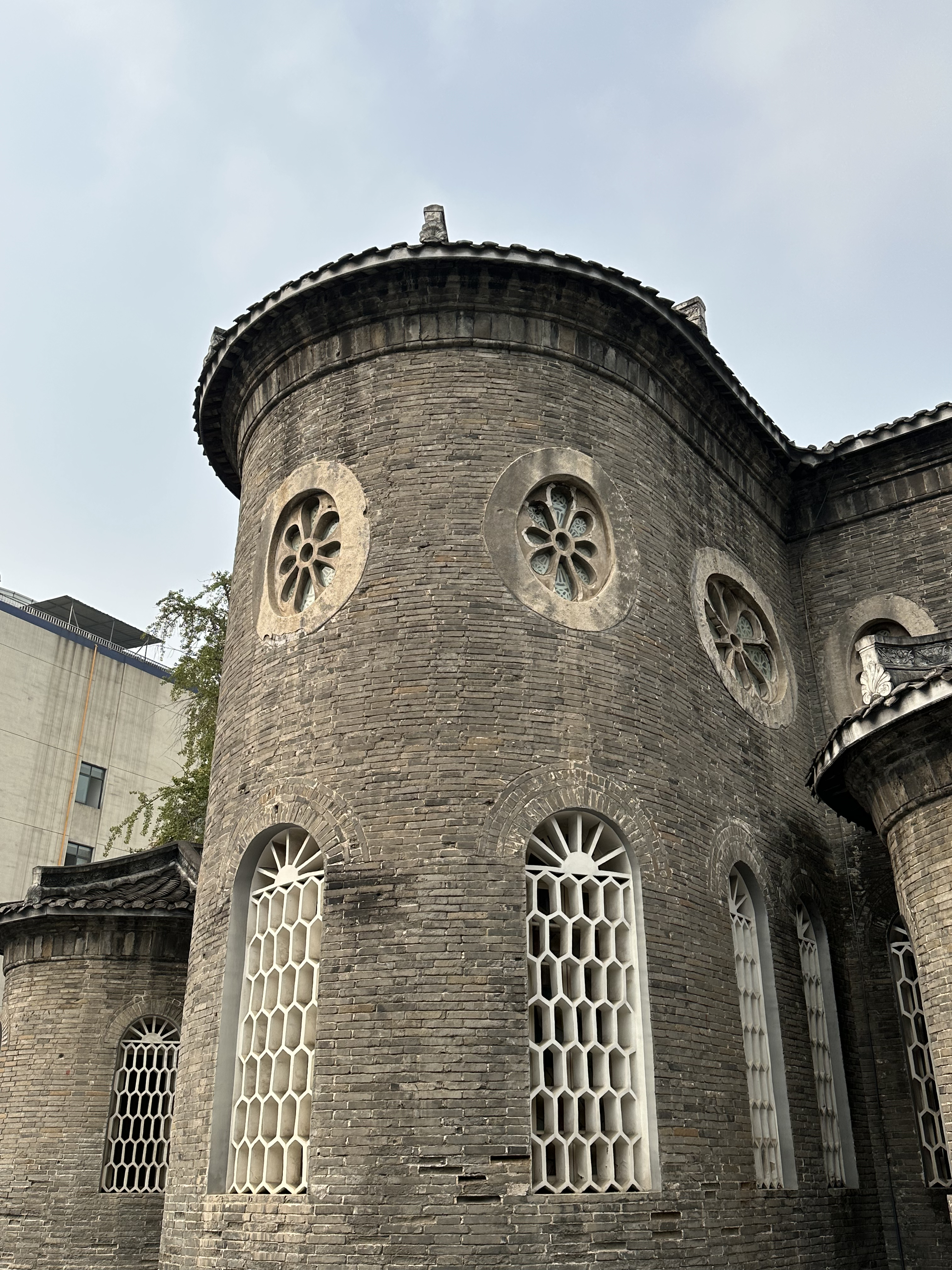
Side view of the Sacred Heart Chapel

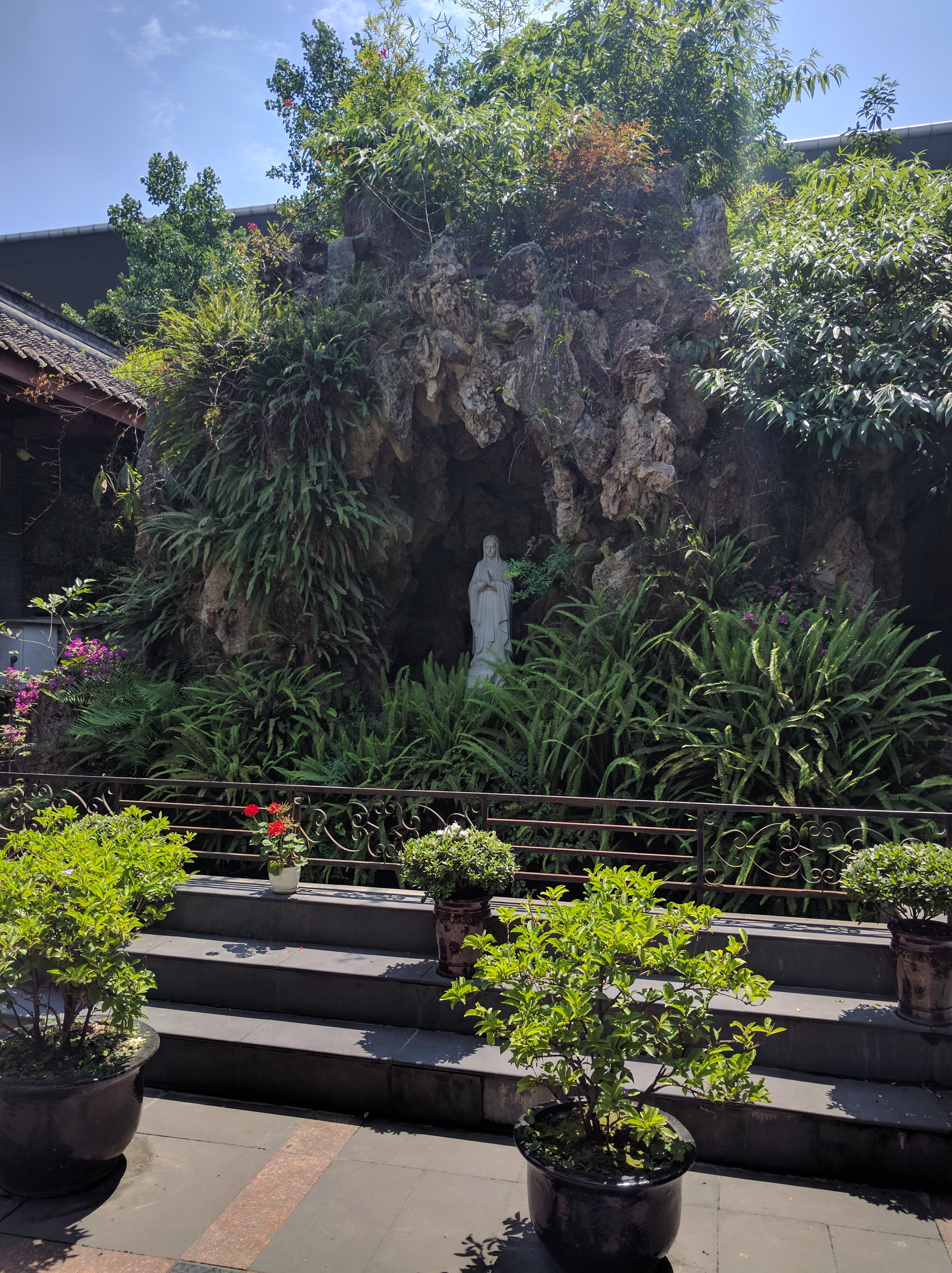
Lourdes grotto

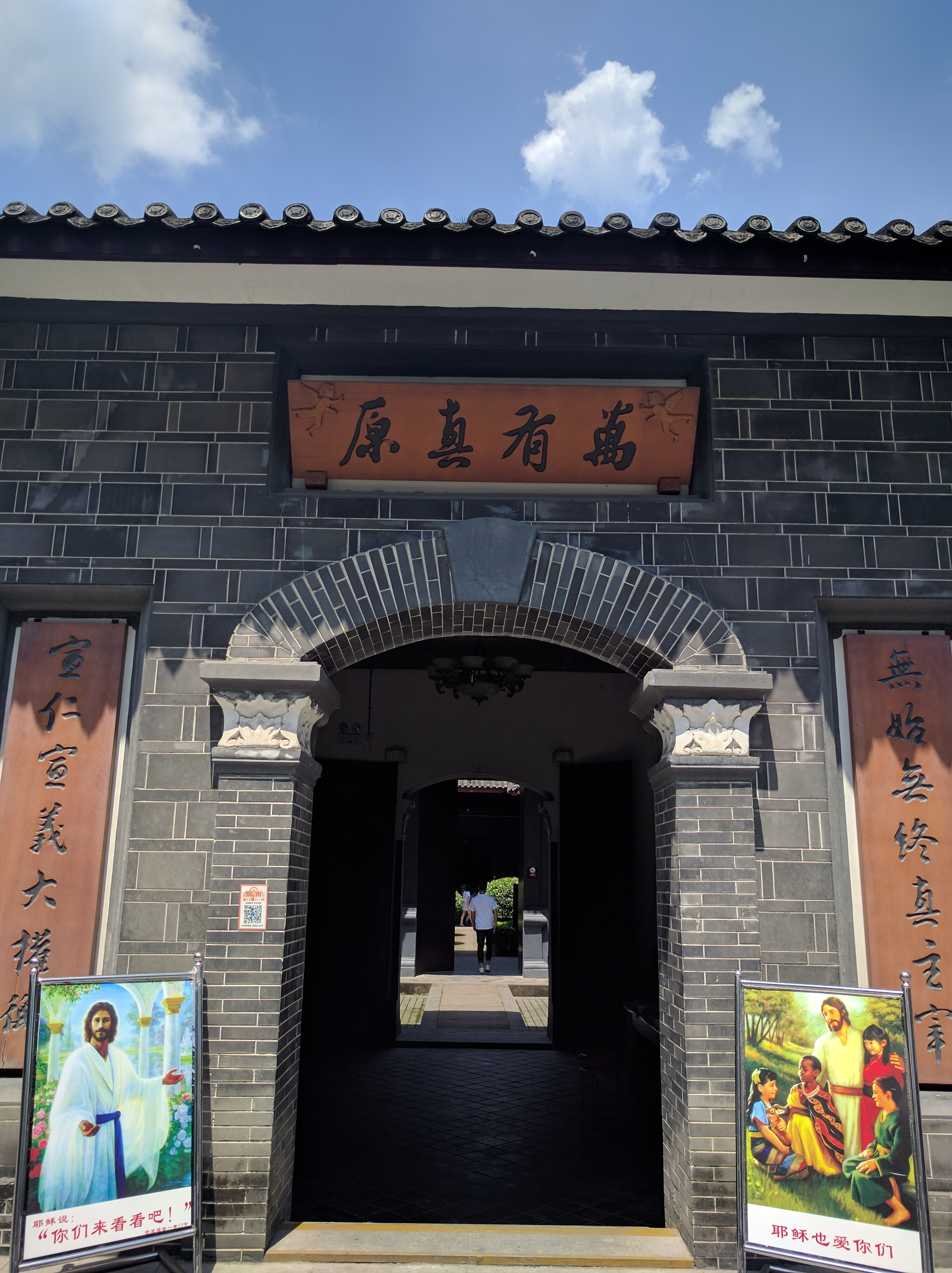
Diocesan curia

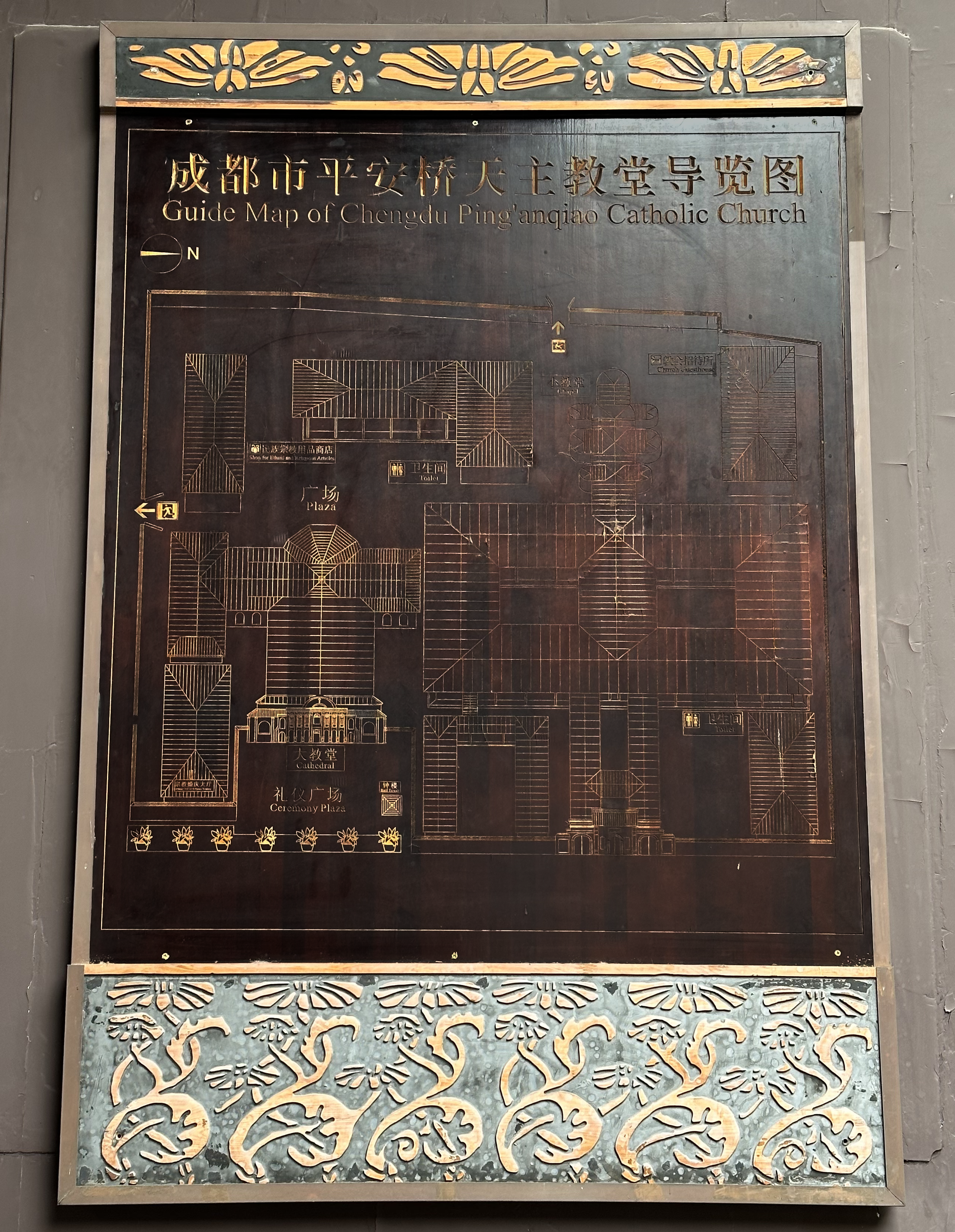
The plan of the cathedral site, in the form of the Chinese character "悚"

== See also ==
- Catholic Church in Sichuan
- Cathedral of the Angels, Xichang
- Cathedral of St Joseph, Chongqing
- Our Lady of Lourdes Church, Mianyang
- St John's Church, Chengdu – former Anglican cathedral of the Diocese of West Szechwan
