= Gabriel-Taurin Dufresse =

French Roman Catholic saint

Saint Gabriel-Taurin Dufresse M.E.P.
- Vicar Apostolic of Se-Ciuen (Setchoan)
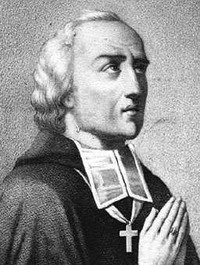
- See: Se-Ciuen (Setchoan or Szechwan)
- Appointed: 24 July 1798
- Installed: 15 November 1801
- Term ended: 14 September 1815
- Predecessor: Jean-Didier de Saint Martin
- Successor: Giacomo Luigi Fontana

Orders
- Ordination: 17 September 1774
- Consecration: 25 July 1800 by Jean-Didier de Saint Martin

Personal details
- Born: Gabriel-Taurin Dufresse; December 8, 1750 Lezoux, Kingdom of France
- Died: September 14, 1815 (aged 64) Chengdu, Sichuan, Qing dynasty
- Denomination: Catholic

Sainthood
- Feast day: 14 September
- Venerated in: Catholic Church
- Title as Saint: Bishop, Martyr
- Beatified: 27 May 1900 by Pope Leo XIII
- Canonized: 1 October 2000 by Pope John Paul II

Gabriel-Taurin Dufresse, MEP (8 December 1750 – 14 September 1815) was a French Catholic prelate who served as Vicar Apostolic of Se-Ciuen from 1801 to 1815. He was member of the Paris Foreign Missions Society.

Murdered for his faith, he is one of the 120 martyrs of China, canonized by Pope John Paul II on October 1, 2000, on the feast of Thérèse of Lisieux, patron saint of the missions.

== Early life ==
Dufresse was born at Ville-de-Lezoux, Diocese of Clermont, France. He attended the parochial school of his village, and then continued his studies at the college of Riom. He then left for Paris, studying first at Louis le Grand, then at the seminary of Saint Sulpice. At the college, he learned about the Paris Foreign Missions Society from one of his teachers, the Abbé Jean-Didier de Saint Martin, who later left for China.

He joined the Society of Foreign Missions of Paris seminary as a deacon in July 1774 and was ordained a priest on 17 September 1774.

== Sichuan ==
Father Dufresse was sent as a missionary to Sichuan (formerly spelled Szechwan, a.k.a. Se-Ciuen or Setchoan), West China in December 1775. In 1776 he left Macau to go inland and reached Szechwan after more than three months of travel. He was then imprisoned once in Peking and released.

As soon as he had learned enough of the Chinese language, Bishop Pottier sent him to the north of the province. At the end of 1784, an anti-Christian persecution broke out. Dufresse was arrested and managed to escape to a friendly Christian house. There he received a note from the coadjutor bishop, Monsignor de Saint-Martin, inviting him to give himself up in order to calm the unrest. He obeyed and left for Tchen-Tou where he arrived on February 27, 1785, where he was imprisoned for a few weeks before being transferred to Peking with Bishop de Saint-Martin and two other missionaries, Delpon and Devaux. There he underwent many painful interrogations before finally being released on November 9, 1785.

One day in 1785, while Dufresse was part of a convoy of prisoners, one of his guards, moved by the faith and patience of the bishop, converted and became the first Chinese-born diocesan priest; he was Augustine Zhao Rong who was martyred in 1815. The same is true of Joseph Yuan, who was also converted at that time, was ordained a priest and arrested in 1816 after evangelizing a vast region; he was strangled on June 24, 1817. These two men and more than a hundred others are part of the group of 120 martyrs of China.

However, although released, the missionaries were not allowed to return to Sichuan. Dufresse therefore requested permission to go to Macau, hoping to return to his mission lands from there. He was taken to Canton, where he took a boat to the Philippines. After a long stay in Manila, he was finally brought back to Macau by a French ship. From Macau, under very difficult traveling conditions, he finally reached Sichuan on January 14, 1789.

== Bishop ==
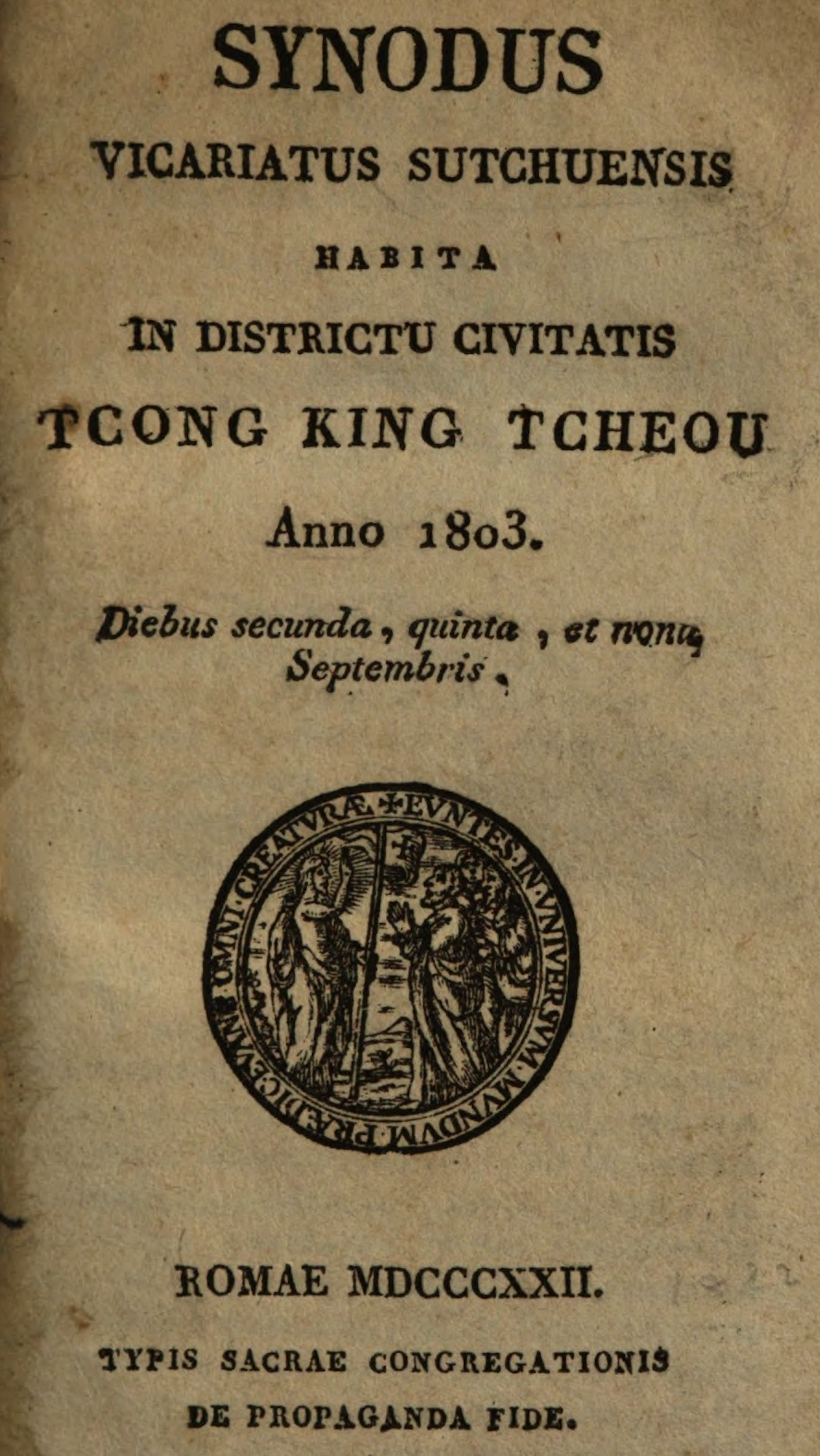
Synodus Vicariatus Sutchuensis ('Synod of the Vicariate of Szechwan'), convened by Bishop Dufresse.

Dufresse baptized children and adults, received new catechumens, heard thousands of confessions and visited many communities. After 4 years, he was named provost. He was appointed as Titular bishop of Thabraca and Co-adjutor Vicar Apostolic of Se-Ciuen (Setchoan), and became the Vicar Apostolic on 15 November 1801, succeeding Bishop de Saint-Martin.

Bishop Dufresse held the Synod of Szechwan in September 1803 at Chongqingzhou, the first Catholic synod ever celebrated in China, whose decisions were strongly approved in Rome and given as an example to the other missions in China. The conversions were numerous and the missionary work progressed.

== Death and burial ==
From 1805 onward, the edicts of proscription against Christians reappeared, at the instigation of local scholars. The Viceroy of Szechwan issued new edicts and Dufresse had to resume a life of wandering, hunted by the authorities. He was betrayed to the authorities by a native Christian and was arrested on 18 May 1815 and sentenced to death. He was beheaded on 14 September 1815 at Chengdu, Sichuan, China. His head was attached to a pole and his body left exposed for three days as a warning to others. This body was later buried by local Christians. Four years later, a Chinese priest named Lin had them moved to the Catholic cemetery. The head of the bishop had been recovered by monks who gave it to Father Lin.

== Veneration ==
In 1856 the relics were sent by Jacques-Léonard Pérocheau, Titular Bishop of Maxula Prates and Vicar Apostolic of Se-Ciuen, to the procurator of the Foreign Missions of Paris in Hong Kong, then brought to Paris in 1857 by Bishop Pellegrin. They now rest in the crypt of the seminary church of the Foreign Missions in Paris.

Pope Leo XIII declared him as venerable on 2 July 1899 and beatified him on 27 May 1900. He was canonized by Pope John Paul II on 1 October 2000. Dufresse's feast day is 14 September.

Ordination history of Gabriel-Taurin Dufresse
History
Priestly ordination
- Date: 17 September 1774
Episcopal consecration
- Consecrated by: Jean-Didier de Saint Martin
- Date: 25 July 1800
Episcopal succession
Bishops consecrated by Gabriel-Taurin Dufresse as principal consecrator
- Pierre Trenchant: 1802
- Jean-Louis Florens: 1810

== See also ==
- Catholic Church in Se-Ciuen

Catholic Church titles
Preceded by Pierre Brigot, M.E.P.	— TITULAR — Bishop of Thabraca; 24 July 1798 — 14 September 1815	Succeeded by Edward Kernan
Preceded by Jean-Didier de Saint Martin	Vicar Apostolic of Se-Ciuen (Setchoan), China; 15 November 1801 — 14 September 1815	Succeeded by Giacomo Luigi Fontana
