= Jacques-Victor-Marius Rouchouse =

French bishop (1860–1948)

His Excellency, The Most Reverend Jacques-Victor-Marius Rouchouse
- Bishop of Chengtu
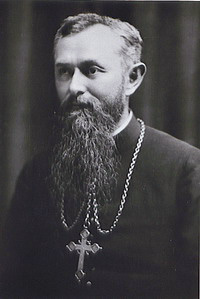
- Church: Catholic Church
- Archdiocese: Chongqing (Chungking)
- Diocese: Chengdu (Chengtu)
- Installed: April 11, 1946
- Term ended: 1983
- Predecessor: Marie-Julien Dunand (as Apostolic Vicar of Northwestern Szechwan)
- Successor: Henri-Marie-Ernest-Désiré Pinault

Orders
- Consecration: December 20, 1948

Personal details
- Born: (June 6, 1860 Saint-Étienne, France
- Died: December 20, 1948 China
- Denomination: Roman Catholicism

Bishop Jacques-Victor-Marius Rouchouse (June 6, 1860 – December 20, 1948) was the first Roman Catholic Bishop of Chengdu during the Chinese Republican Era, a post he held from 1946 until his death in 1948.

== Biography ==
Rouchouse was born in the city Saint-Étienne in eastern France. He received his ordination on June 30, 1895, as a priest of the Paris Foreign Missions Society. From 1897 to 1904, he supervised the construction of the Cathedral of the Immaculate Conception at Chengdu. On January 28, 1916, he received the dual appointments of Vicar Apostolic of Northwestern Szechwan and Titular Bishop of Aegeae. On April 11, 1946, he was appointed Bishop of Chengdu, a position he held until his death on December 20, 1948. Bishop Rouchouse was succeeded as Bishop of Chengdu by Henri-Marie-Ernest-Désiré Pinault.

== See also ==
- Catholic Church in Sichuan
