= Évran =

Évran Evrann
- Commune
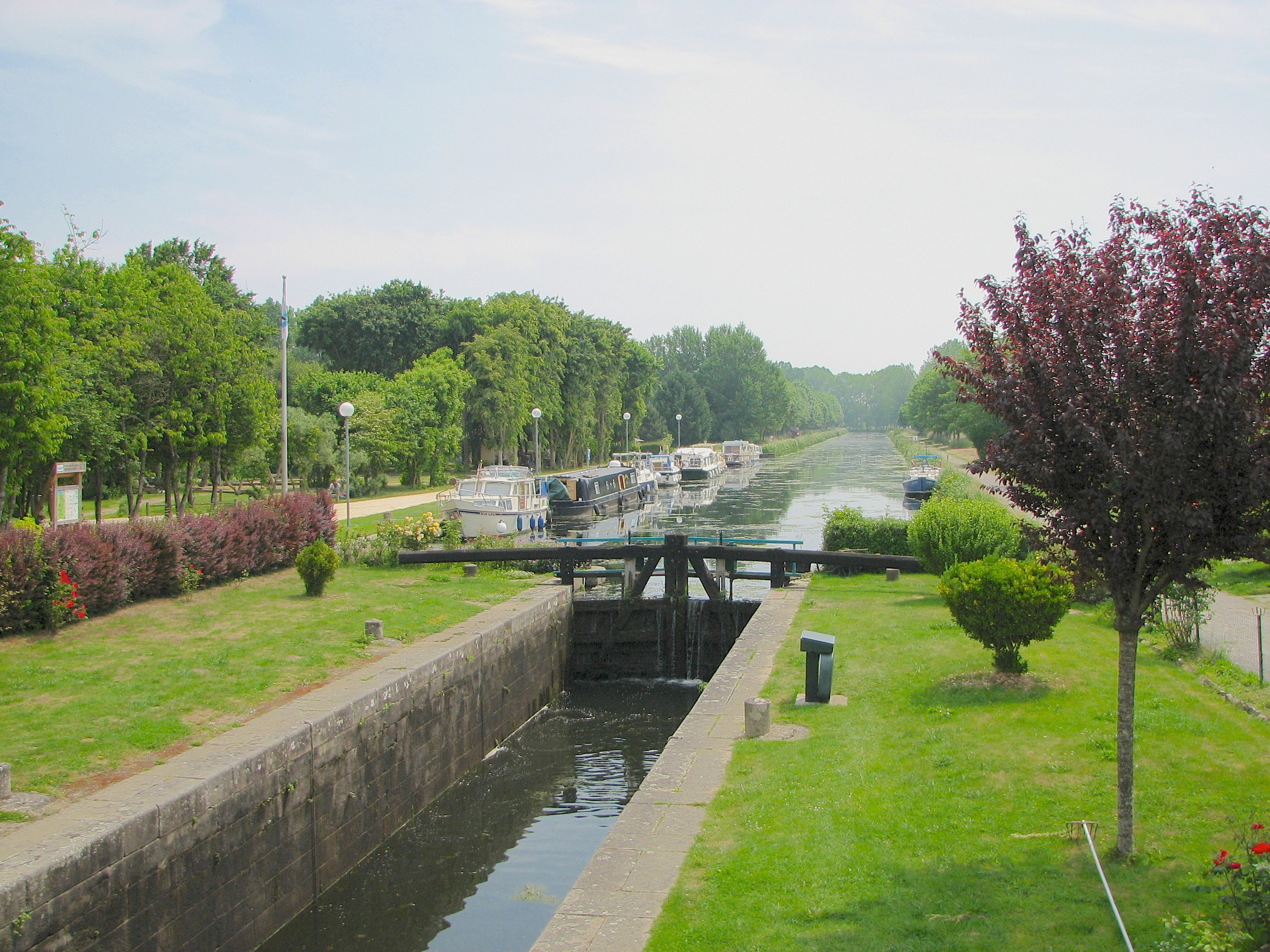
- Lock on the Canal d'Ille-et-Rance

- Flag Coat of arms
- Location of Évran
- Location within France Location within Brittany
- Coordinates: 48°23′00″N 1°58′47″W
- Country: France
- Region: Brittany
- Department: Côtes-d'Armor
- Arrondissement: Dinan
- Canton: Lanvallay
- Intercommunality: Dinan Agglomération

Government
  - Mayor (2020–2026): Patrice Gautier
- Area^{1}: 23.56 km^{2} (9.10 sq mi)
- Highest elevation: 75 m (246 ft)
- Lowest elevation: 9 m (30 ft)
- Population (2023): 1,784
  - Density: 75.72/km^{2} (196.1/sq mi)
- Time zone: UTC+01:00 (CET)
  - Summer (DST): UTC+02:00 (CEST)
- INSEE/Postal code: 22056 /22630
- ^{1} French Land Register data, which excludes lakes, ponds, glaciers > 1 km^{2} (0.386 sq mi or 247 acres) and river estuaries.

Évran (French pronunciation: [evʁɑ̃]; Breton: Evrann; Gallo: Evran) is a commune in the Côtes-d'Armor department in the region of Brittany in northwestern France.

== Population ==
Historical population
Year	Pop.	±% p.a.
1968	1,468	—
1975	1,524	+0.54%
1982	1,596	+0.66%
1990	1,561	−0.28%
1999	1,473	−0.64%
2007	1,616	+1.16%
2012	1,749	+1.59%
2017	1,712	−0.43%
2023	1,784	+0.69%
Source: INSEE

The inhabitants of Évran are known in French as évrannais.

== Personalities ==
- Henri Pinault, Roman Catholic Bishop of Chengdu, died in Évran in 1987

== See also ==
- Communes of the Côtes-d'Armor department
