= Jacques-Léonard Pérocheau =

Roman Catholic bishop

The Most Reverend Jacques-Léonard Pérocheau
- Vicar Apostolic of Se-Ciuen; Titular Bishop of Maxula Prates
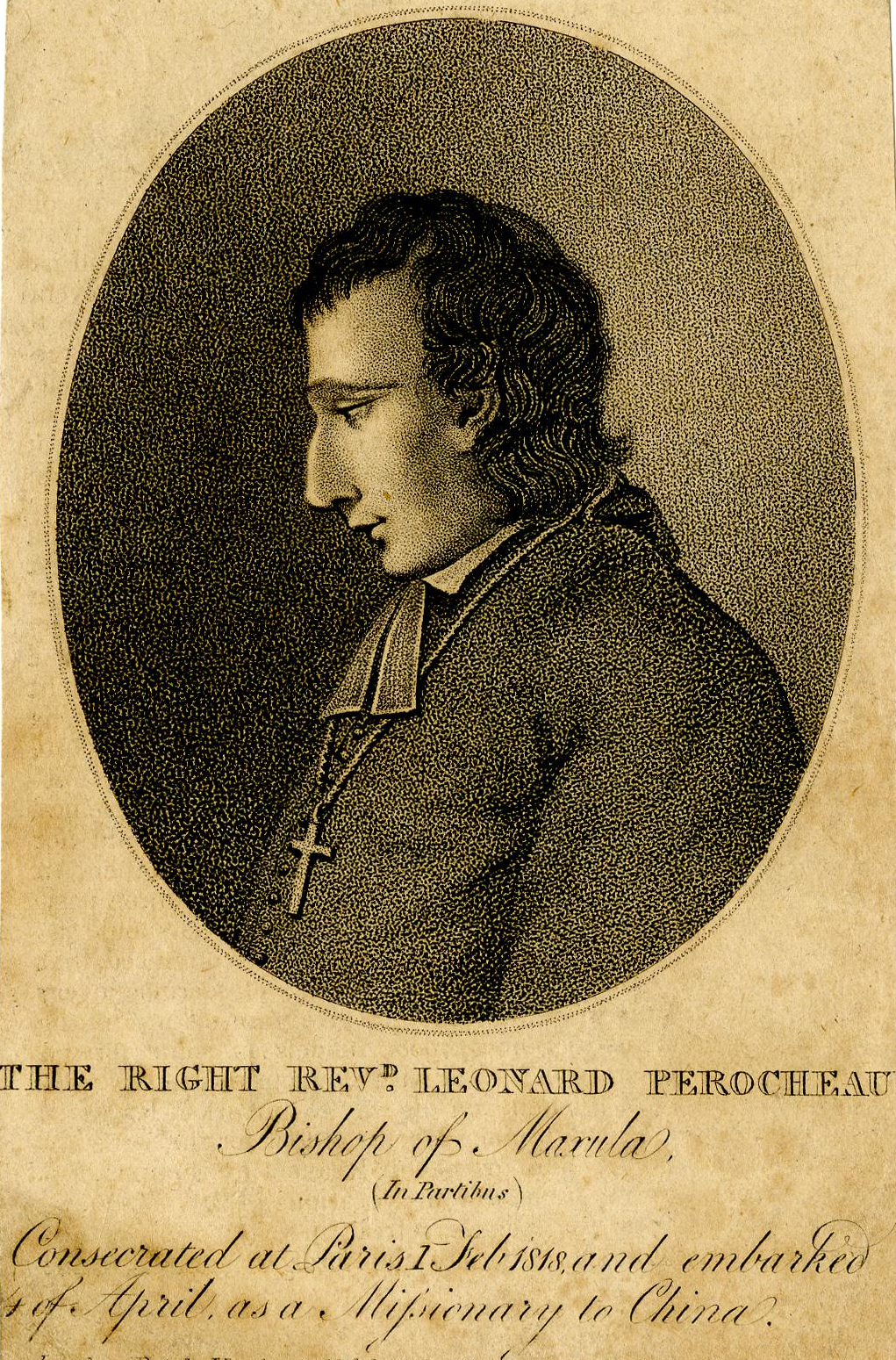
- Church: Catholic Church
- Diocese: Apostolic Vicariate of Northwestern Szechwan
- In office: 1856–1861
- Predecessor: Giacomo Luigi Fontana
- Successor: Annet-Théophile Pinchon
- Previous post: Vicar Apostolic of Se-Ciuen (1838–1856)

Orders
- Ordination: 1812
- Consecration: 1 Feb 1818 by François de Bovet

Personal details
- Born: 6 Jan 1787 Les Sables-d'Olonne, France
- Died: 6 May 1861 (age 74)

Jacques-Léonard Pérocheau, M.E.P. (Chinese name: 馬伯樂; 1787–1861) was a Roman Catholic prelate who served as Vicar Apostolic of Northwestern Szechwan (1856–1861), Vicar Apostolic of Se-Ciuen (1838–1856), and Titular Bishop of Maxula Prates (1817–1861).

== Biography ==
Jacques-Léonard Pérocheau was born in Les Sables-d'Olonne, France on 6 Jan 1787 and ordained a priest in the La Société des Missions Etrangères in 1812. On 3 Oct 1817, he was appointed during the papacy of Pope Pius VII as Titular Bishop of Maxula Prates and Coadjutor Vicar Apostolic of Se-Ciuen. On 1 Feb 1818, he was consecrated bishop by François de Bovet, Archbishop of Toulouse, with Jean-Claude Leblanc de Beaulieu, Archbishop of Arles, and William Poynter, Titular Bishop of Alias, serving as co-consecrators. On 11 Jul 1838, he succeeded to the bishopric. On 4 Apr 1856, he was appointed during the papacy of Pope Pius IX as Vicar Apostolic of Northwestern Szechwan. He served as Vicar Apostolic of Northwestern Szechwan until his death on 6 May 1861.

== Episcopal succession ==
While bishop, he was the principal consecrator of:

- Giacomo Luigi Fontana, Titular Bishop of Sinitis and Vicar Apostolic of Se-Ciuen (1820);
- Joseph Ponsot, Titular Bishop of Philomelium and Vicar Apostolic of Yünnan (1843);
- Eugène-Jean-Claude-Joseph Desflèches, Titular Bishop of Sinitis and Coadjutor Vicar Apostolic of Se-Ciuen (1844); and
- Annet-Théophile Pinchon, Titular Bishop of Polemonium and Coadjutor Vicar Apostolic of Northwestern Szechwan (1859).

== See also ==
- Catholic Church in Sichuan

Catholic Church titles
Preceded by John Young (bishop of Limerick)	Titular Bishop of Maxula Prates; 1817–1861	Succeeded by Léon-Paul Classe
Preceded by Giacomo Luigi Fontana	Vicar Apostolic of Se-Ciuen then Vicar Apostolic of Northwestern Szechwan; 1838–1861	Succeeded by Annet-Théophile Pinchon
