= Diocese of Chengdu =

Roman Catholic diocese in China

Coordinates: 30.66638°N 104.05935°E

Diocese of Chengdu Dioecesis Cemtuana 天主教成都教區 天主教成都教区
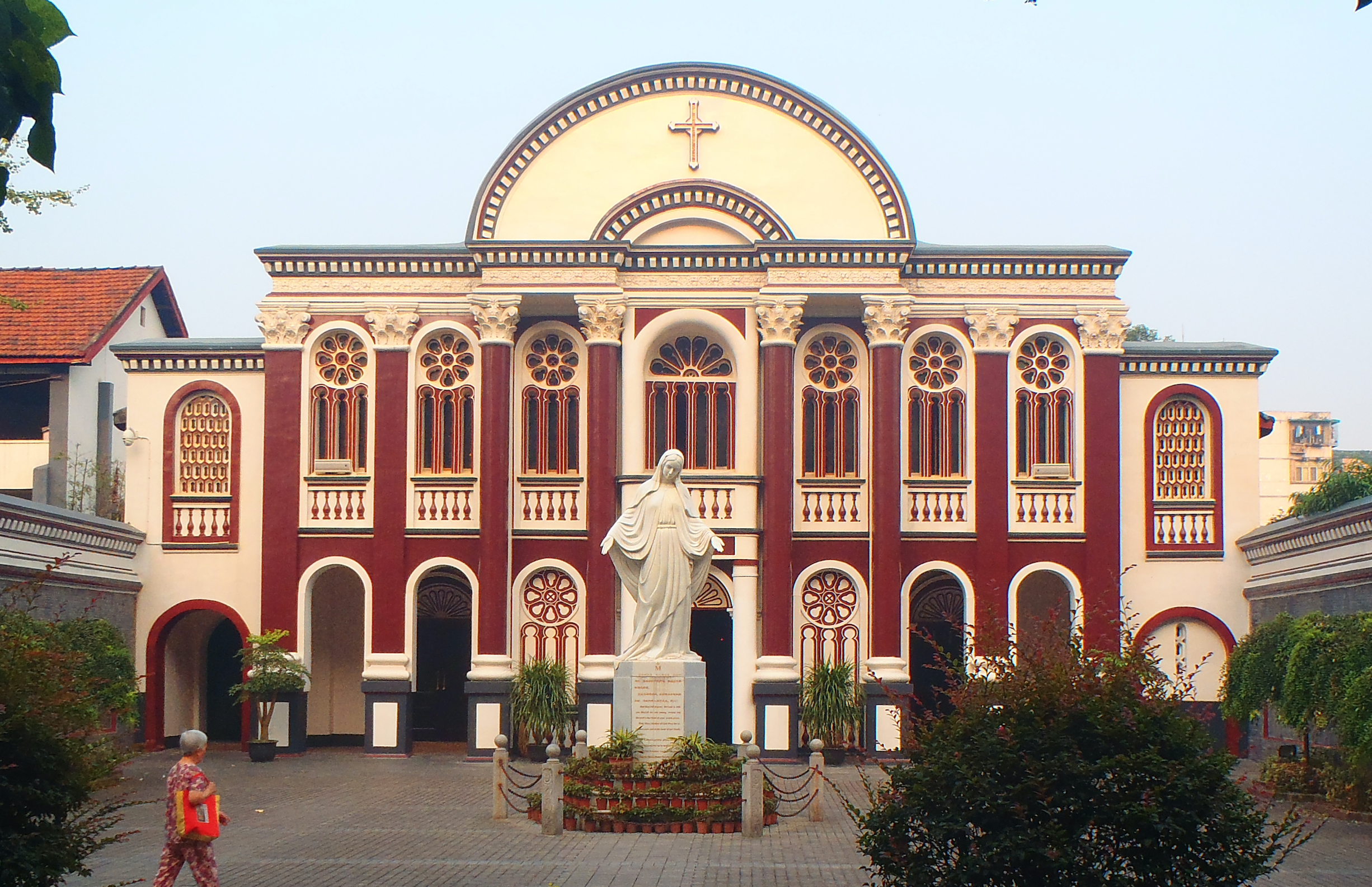
- Immaculate Conception Cathedral, Chengdu

- Coat of arms

Location
- Country: China
- Ecclesiastical province: Chongqing
- Metropolitan: Chongqing

Statistics
- Area: 100,000 km^{2} (39,000 sq mi)
- Population: Total; Catholics: (as of 1950); 20,000,000; 40,240 (0.2%)

Information
- Denomination: Catholic Church
- Sui iuris church: Latin Church
- Rite: Roman Rite
- Established: 15 October 1696 (as apostolic vicariate)
- Cathedral: Immaculate Conception Cathedral, Chengdu

Current leadership
- Pope: Leo XIV
- Bishop: Joseph Tang Yuange
- Metropolitan Archbishop: Sede vacante

Map
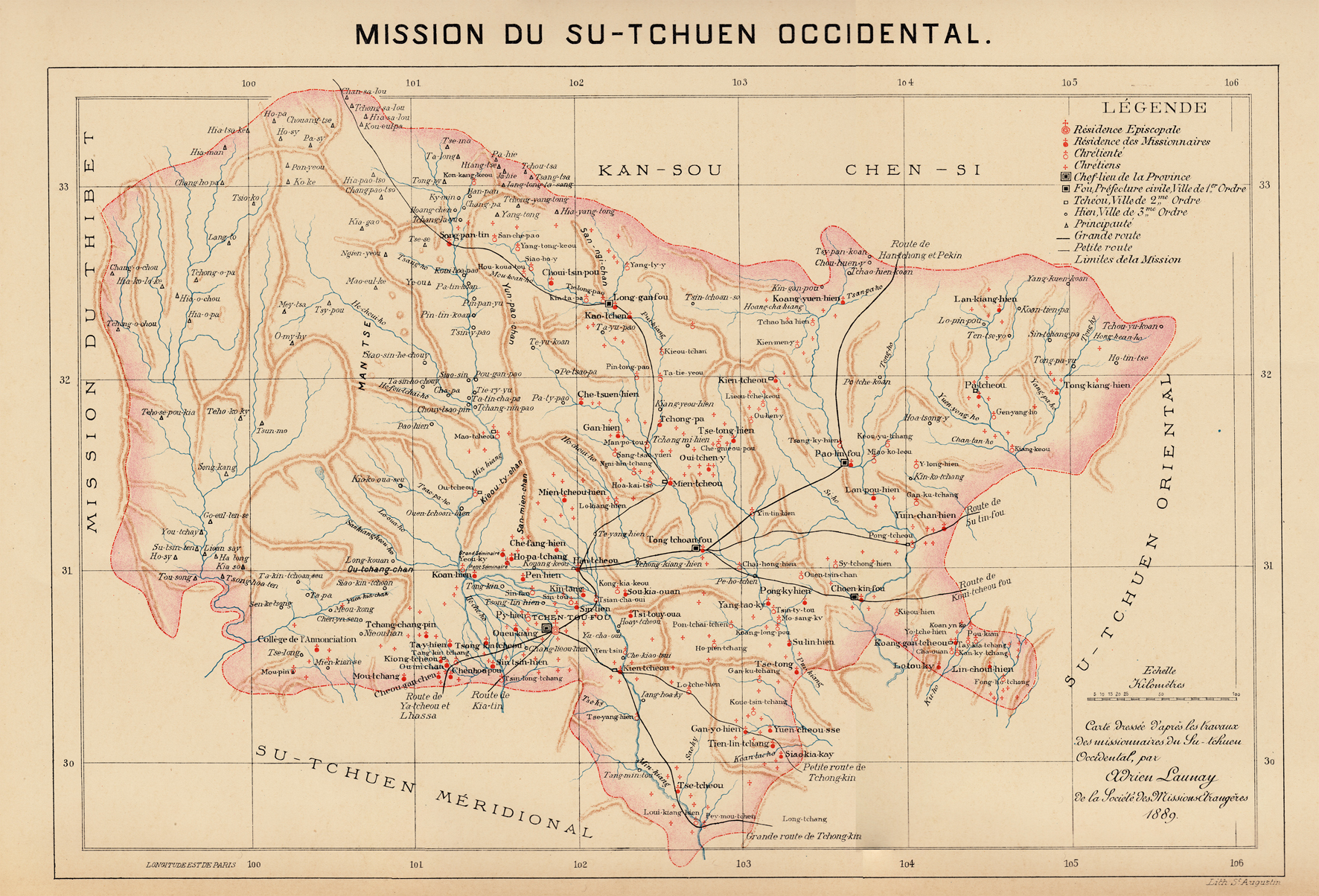
- Chengdu (Tchen-tou-fou) was part of the Western Szechwan Mission. Map prepared by Adrien Launay, 1889.

The Diocese of Chengdu (formerly spelt Chengtu) (Latin: Dioecesis Cemtuana; simplified Chinese: 天主教成都教区; traditional Chinese: 天主教成都教區) is a suffragan Latin Catholic diocese in the ecclesiastical province of Chongqing covering southwestern China's Sichuan area, yet depends on the missionary Roman Congregation for the Evangelization of Peoples.

Established on 15 October 1696 as the Apostolic Vicariate of Szechwan, its episcopal see is the Cathedral of the Immaculate Conception (colloquially known as Ping'anqiao Church) located in the city of Chengdu. The Diocese of Chengdu is the first bishopric of the Catholic Church in Sichuan (Szechwan), since the separation of the mission's eastern territory in 1856, it was designated Western Szechwan Mission.

== Extent ==
The diocese, based in Chengdu, covers 4 cities, namely, Chengdu (Tchen-tou-fou), Deyang (Te-yang-hien), Guangyuan (Koang-yuen-hien) and Mianyang (Mien-tcheou-hien), and 37 districts and counties, totaling an area of 54,900 square kilometers.

It is bordered by the Diocese of Kangding to the west, Diocese of Shunqing to the east, Diocese of Jiading to the south, Diocese of Qinzhou to the northwest, and Diocese of Hanzhong to the northeast.

No recent statistics available.

== History ==
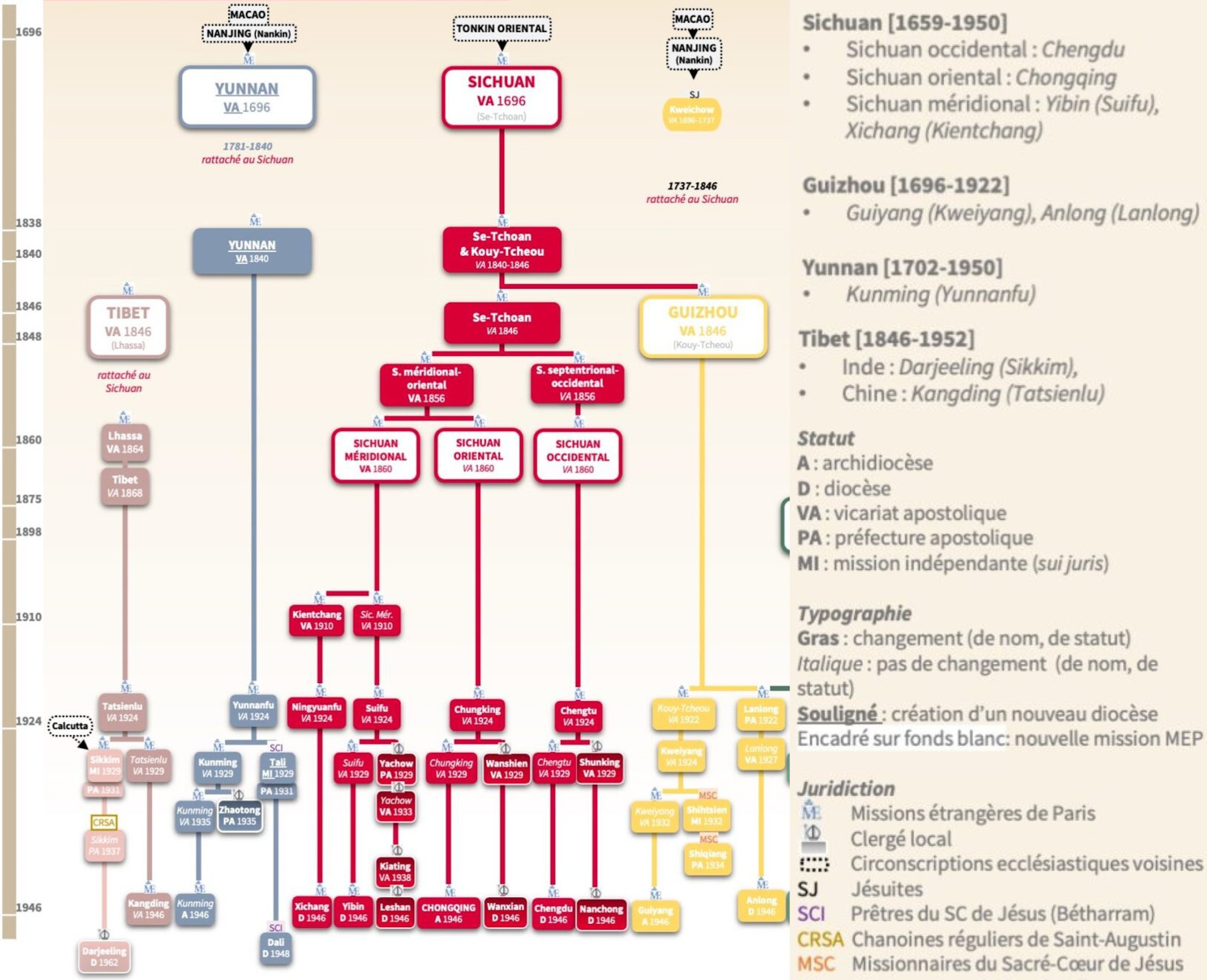
Genealogy of MEP ecclesiastical jurisdiction in Sichuan (Szechwan), with its three attachments: Tibet, Yunnan and Guizhou (Kweichow).

- Established on 15 October 1696 as Apostolic Vicariate of Szechwan (Vicariatus Apostolicus Seciuensis), on territory split off from the Apostolic Vicariate of Fokien
- Gained territories twice: in 1715 from the suppressed Apostolic Vicariate of Kweichow and in 1755 from the suppressed Apostolic Vicariate of Yunnan
- Lost territories repeatedly: on 28 August 1840 to re-establish the Apostolic Vicariate of Yunnan and on 27 March 1846 to re-establish the Apostolic Vicariate of Kweichow and establish the Apostolic Vicariate of Lhasa
- Renamed on 2 April 1856 as Apostolic Vicariate of Northwestern Szechwan (Vicariatus Apostolicus Seciuensis Septentrionalis-Occidentalis), having lost territory to establish Apostolic Vicariate of Eastern Szechwan)
- Lost more territory on 24 January 1860 to establish the Apostolic Vicariate of Southern Szechwan
- Renamed again on 3 December 1924 after its see as Apostolic Vicariate of Chengtu (Vicariatus Apostolicus Cemtuanus; Tchen-tou-fou)
- Lost territory on 2 August 1929 to establish the Apostolic Vicariate of Shunkingfu (Choen-kin-fou)
- Promoted on 11 April 1946 as Diocese of Chengtu (Dioecesis Cemtuana)

One of the headquarters of the Spanish Redemptorist missions in Sichuan was based in the Apostolic Vicariate of Chengtu.

== Episcopal ordinaries ==
All Roman Rite; so far, like other members of Latin congregations, it has ministered by European missionaries for most of its history.

Apostolic Vicars of Szechwan

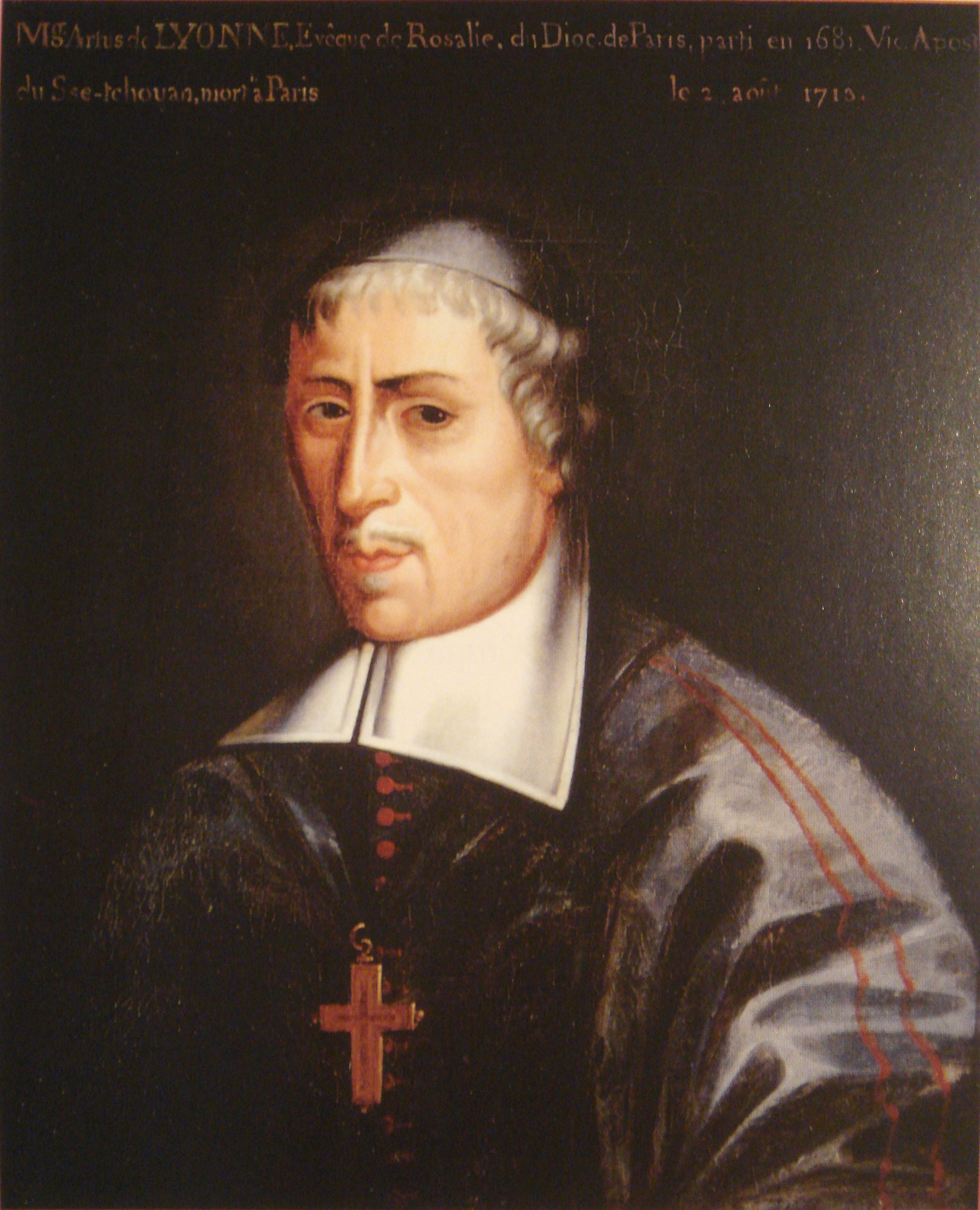
Artus de Lionne, first Apostolic Vicar of Szechwan.

- Artus de Lionne (Paris Foreign Missions Society, abbreviated M.E.P.) (born in France) (30 November 1700 - death 2 August 1713) - never resident in diocese; Titular Bishop of Rosalia (1687.02.05 – 1713.08.02), initially as Coadjutor Vicar Apostolic of Szechwan (1687.02.05 – 1696.10.20)
- Johannes Müllener (Lazarists, abbreviated C.M.) (born in the Duchies of Bremen and Verden, present-day Germany) (8 December 1716 - death 17 December 1742), Titular Bishop of Myriophytos (1715.09.02 – 1742.12.17)
- Luigi Maria Maggi, gallicized as Louis Marie Maggi (Dominican Order, abbreviated O.P.) (born in Italy) (December 17, 1742 - August 20, 1743), Titular Bishop of Baris in Hellesponto (1738.10.08 – 1743.08.20), initially as Coadjutor Apostolic Vicar of Szechwan (1738.10.08 – 1742.12.17)
- Joachim-Enjobert de Martiliat, M.E.P. (born in France) (August 20, 1743 - death 24 August 1755), Titular Bishop of Echinus (1739.10.02 – 1755.08.24), initially as Coadjutor Apostolic Vicar of Yunnan (1739.10.02 – 1743.08.20)
- Pierre-Jean Kerhervé, M.E.P. (born in France) (1762.07.27 – death 1766.01.22 not possessed), Titular Bishop of Gortyna (1762.07.27 – 1766.01.22)
- François Pottier, M.E.P. (born in France) (24 January 1767 – death 28 September 1792), Titular Bishop of Agathopolis (1767.01.24 – 1792.09.28)
- Saint Gabriel-Taurin Dufresse, M.E.P. (born in France) (15 November 1801 – death 14 September 1815), Titular Bishop of Tabraca (1798.07.24 – 1815.09.14), initially as Coadjutor Apostolic Vicar of Szechwan (1798.07.24 – 1801.11.15)
- Giacomo Luigi Fontana, gallicized as Jacques Louis Fontana, M.E.P. (born in the Kingdom of Sardinia, present-day Italy) (July 1817 – 11 July 1838), Titular Bishop of Sinita (1817.05.24 – 1838.07.11), later Apostolic Vicar of Hupeh and Hunan (central China) (1838 – death 1838.07.11)
- Jacques-Léonard Pérocheau, M.E.P. (born in France) (11 July 1838 – 2 April 1856 see below), Titular Bishop of Maxula (1817.09.30 – 1861.05.06), initially as Coadjutor Vicar Apostolic of Szechwan (1817.09.30 – 1838.07.11)

Apostolic Vicars of Northwestern Szechwan

- Jacques-Léonard Pérocheau, M.E.P. (see above 2 April 1856 – death 6 May 1861)
- Annet-Théophile Pinchon, M.E.P. (born in France) (6 May 1861 – death 26 October 1891), Titular Bishop of Polemonium (1859.04.23 – 1891.10.26), initially as Coadjutor Apostolic Vicar of Northwestern Szechwan (1859.04.23 – 1861.05.06)
- Marie-Julien Dunand, M.E.P. (born in France) (21 April 1893 – death 4 August 1915), Titular Bishop of Calœ (1893.08.21 – 1915.08.04)
- Jacques-Victor-Marius Rouchouse, M.E.P. (born in France) (28 January 1916 – 3 December 1924 see below), Titular Bishop of Ægeæ (1916.01.28 – 1946.04.11)

Apostolic Vicar of Chengtu

- Jacques-Victor-Marius Rouchouse, M.E.P. (see above 3 December 1924 – 11 April 1946 see below)

Suffragan Bishops of Chengtu

- Jacques-Victor-Marius Rouchouse, M.E.P. (see above 11 April 1946 – death 20 December 1948)
- Henri-Marie-Ernest-Désiré Pinault, M.E.P. (14 July 1949 – retired 1983), died 1987

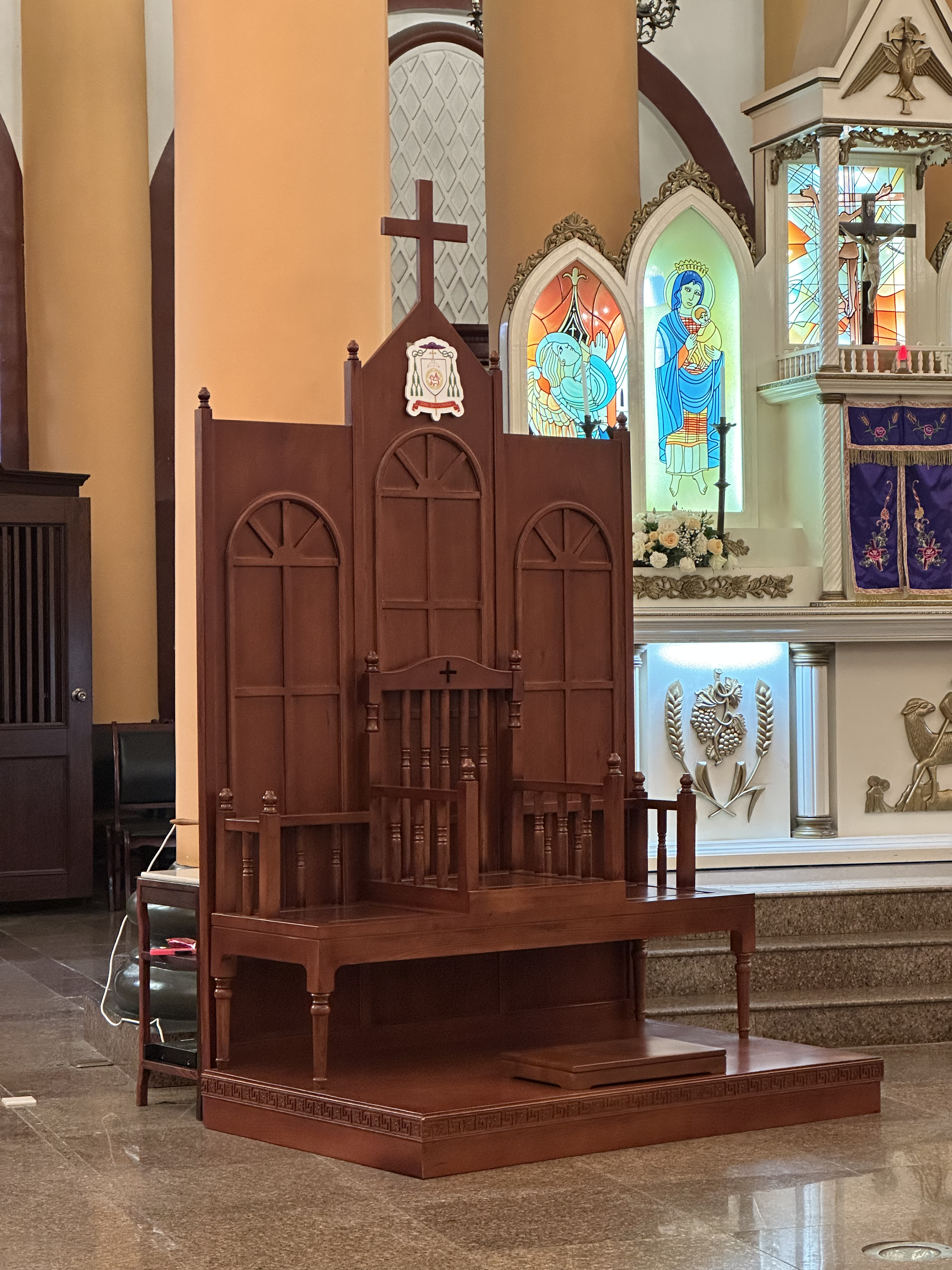
The current cathedra of the Bishop of Chengdu, in the Cathedral of the Immaculate Conception. The coat of arms of Joseph Tang Yuange is visible.

Suffragan Bishops of Chengdu

- John Li Xiting (first Chinese native incumbent) (1958 – death 1989.05.28) - no papal mandate
- Michael Liu Xianru (1992 – death 1998.10.25) - no papal mandate
- Joseph Tang Yuange (2015.12 [2016.11.30] – ...)

== See also ==
- Catholic Church in Mianyang
- Anglican Diocese of Szechwan
- Our Lady of Lourdes Church, Mianyang
- List of Catholic dioceses in China

== Sources and external links ==
- "Diocese of Chengdu — with Google satellite photo, data for all sections". gcatholic.org.
- "Diocese of Chengdu [Chengtu]". catholic-hierarchy.org.
- Zehnder, Christopher (1998). "Give Me Jesus: The Story of a Missionary Priest (an account of a priest who worked within the Diocese of Chengdu)". losangelesmission.com. Archived from the original on 8 September 2008.
