= François de Bovet =

French archbishop (1745–1838)

François de Bovet (March 21, 1745, in Grenoble – April 6, 1838, in Paris) was bishop of Sisteron from 1789 to 1812, and from 1817 to 1820 was archbishop of Toulouse.

He was consecrated as bishop on September 13, 1789, in Paris. Due to religious persecution he had to leave France for much of the Revolution. He did not resign his bishopric in line with the Concordat of 1801, but instead held on to his diocese until 1812. Since the consecrator of him is not known and some of the bishops alive today can trace their episcopal lineage back to him, the person of François de Bovet is very important for the history of the Catholic Church. This so-called de Bovet lineage includes seven members of the episcopate scattered between Malaysia (three), Indonesia (one), Taiwan (one) and China (two).

== Works ==
- 1797: Réflexions sur un prétendu bref du 5 juillet 1796
- 1801: Réflexions sur la promesse de fidélité à la constitution
- 1817: Observations de Monseigneur de Bovet, évêque de Sisteron
- 1819: Les Consolations de la foi sur les malheurs de l'Église
- 1835: Les dynasties égyptiennes
- 1835: Histoire des derniers pharaons et des premiers rois de Perse, selon Hérodote, tirée des livres prophétiques et du livre d'Esther (2 vol.)
- 1840: L'Esprit de l'Apocalypse
