= Joseph Tang Yuange =

Sichuanese Roman Catholic priest (born 1963)

- Bishop of Chengdu
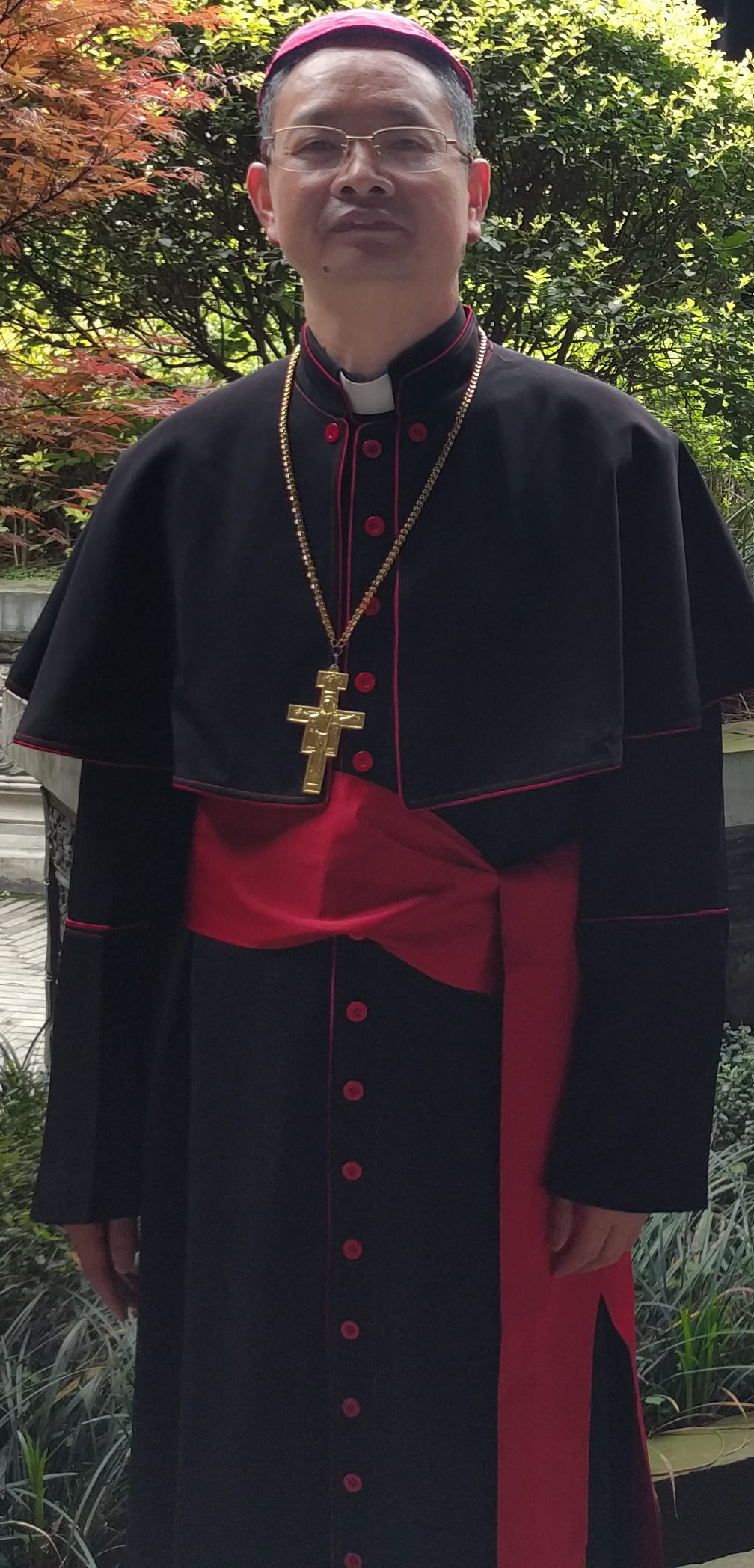
- Joseph Tang Yuange
- Church: Chinese Patriotic Catholic Church
- Archdiocese: Chongqing
- Diocese: Chengdu
- Installed: 2016
- Predecessor: Michael Liu Xianru

Orders
- Ordination: 1991

Personal details
- Born: November 17, 1963 (age 62) Jintang County, Sichuan, China
- Denomination: Roman Catholic
- Education: Sichuan Catholic Theological and Philosophical College
- Motto: Fides, Spes et Caritas (Latin for 'Faith, Hope, and Charity')
- Coat of arms

Chinese name
- Traditional Chinese: 唐遠閣
- Simplified Chinese: 唐远阁
Transcriptions
Standard Mandarin
- Hanyu Pinyin: Táng Yuǎngé

Joseph Tang Yuange (simplified Chinese: 唐远阁; traditional Chinese: 唐遠閣; pinyin: Táng Yuǎngé; born November 17, 1963) is a Sichuanese Roman Catholic priest and Bishop of the Diocese of Chengdu since 2016.

== Biography ==
Tang was born in Jintang County, Sichuan, on November 17, 1963. From 1984 to 1988 he studied at the Sichuan Catholic Theological and Philosophical College.

He was ordained a priest in 1991. He was elected Bishop of Chengdu. He accepted the episcopacy with the papal mandate on November 30, 2016.

== See also ==
- Catholic Church in Sichuan
- Immaculate Conception Cathedral, Chengdu

Catholic Church titles
Previous: Michael Liu Xian-ru	Bishop of the Diocese of Chengdu; 2016	Incumbent
