= Hebachang =

- township

Chinese transcription(s)
  - Characters: 河坝场
  - Pinyin: Hébàcháng
- Interactive map of Hebachang
- Coordinates: 31°25′N 104°20′E
- Country: China
- Province: Sichuan
- Prefecture-level city: Deyang
- Time zone: UTC+8 (China Standard)

Hebachang (Chinese: 河坝场; pinyin: Hébàcháng; Wade–Giles: Ho-Pa-Chang) is a township located in Deyang prefecture, Sichuan province in China.
