= Caloe =

Town in the Roman province of Asia

Caloe was a town in the Roman province of Asia. It is mentioned as Kaloe or Keloue in 3rd-century inscriptions; as Kalose in Hierocles's Synecdemos (660); and as Kalloe, Kaloe, and Kolone in Parthey's Notitiæ episcopatuum, in which it figures from the 6th to the 12fth or 13th century.

== Description ==
Caloe was in the upper valley of the Küçük Menderes (Kaystros) western Turkey, and is identified with the modern Kiraz, Keleş stream, to the southwest of Alaşehir (ancient Philadelphia). The 10th-century historian Leo the Deacon, who was born in Caloe, describes the village as, "a very beautiful village in Asia, located on the slopes of Mt. Tmolos, near the sources of the river Kaystros, which, after flowing past the Kelbianon region and offering a most pleasant vista to the beholder, empties out into the gulf of Ephesos, that famous and celebrated city, and forms an estuary."

The bishopric of Caloe was a suffragan of the metropolitan see of Ephesus and was thus within the Roman province of Asia. Le Quien was therefore mistaken in supposing that the titular see was named after Lake Koloe in Lydia, near which were the tombs of Lydian kings and the temple of Artemis Koloene.

The names of three of its bishops are known because their participation in councils: Aphobius in the Council of Ephesus of 431; Gregorius in the Trullan Council of 692; and Theophanes in the Second Council of Nicaea in 787.

No longer a residential bishopric, Caloe is today listed by the Catholic Church as a titular see.
