= Joseph Xu Zhixuan =

Chinese Catholic bishop (b. 1916)

- Bishop of Wanxian
- Native name: 徐之玄
- Church: Catholic Church (Latin Church)
- Archdiocese: Chongqing
- Diocese: Wanxian
- Installed: 2001
- Term ended: 2008
- Predecessor: Matthias Duan Yinming
- Successor: Paul He Zeqing

Orders
- Ordination: 2001

Personal details
- Born: July 7, 1916 Dachuan District, Dazhou, Sichuan, Republican China
- Died: December 8, 2008 (aged 92) Wanzhou District, Chongqing, China
- Denomination: Roman Catholic
- Education: Fu Jen Catholic University

Chinese name
- Chinese: 徐之玄
Transcriptions
Standard Mandarin
- Hanyu Pinyin: Xú Zhīxuán

Joseph Xu Zhixuan (Chinese: 徐之玄; 7 July 1916 - 8 December 2008) was a Sichuanese Roman Catholic bishop of the Diocese of Wanxian, western China.

== Biography ==
Xu was born Xu Huafu (simplified Chinese: 徐华富; traditional Chinese: 徐華富) in Dachuan District of Dazhou, Sichuan, on July 7, 1916. From 1928 to 1934 he studied in small Catholic churches in both Ba County and Zhong County. From 1934 to 1939 he studied at Zhenye Middle School (simplified Chinese: 震野中学; traditional Chinese: 震野中學). After graduating the Wan County Institute of Philosophy in 1943, he taught at a Catholic church in Zhong County. He was ordained a priest in 1946. In 1947 he was accepted to the Fu Jen Catholic University. After university, he went back to the Wan County Institute of Philosophy as a teacher there.

In 1950 he entered the Beijing National Normal University. After graduating in 1953, he became a maths teacher at the Beijing No. 4 High School. In 1959 he was transferred to a state farm in northeast China's Heilongjiang province to reform through labour. In 1971, the Chinese government allowed him to return home. He was rehabilitated in 1978, after the Cultural Revolution. In 1982 he became a priest at a Catholic church in Da County, and served until 1998. He was ordained assistant bishop of the Diocese of Wanxian on July 31, 1989. He was promoted to become bishop on January 16, 2001.

He died on December 8, 2008, aged 93.

Catholic Church titles
Previous: Matthias Duan Yinming	Bishop of the Diocese of Wanxian; 2001-2008	Next: Paul He Zeqing
