= Peter Luo Xuegang =

Most Reverend Peter Luo Xuegang
- Bishop of Suifu
- Church: Catholic Church
- Archdiocese: Chongqing
- Diocese: Suifu
- Installed: 16 December 2012
- Predecessor: John Chen Shi-zhong
- Successor: Incumbent

Orders
- Ordination: 30 November 1991
- Consecration: 30 November 2012 by John Chen Shi-zhong

Personal details
- Born: 罗学刚; February 20, 1964 (age 62) Renshou County, Sichuan, China
- Denomination: Roman Catholic
- Education: Sichuan Catholic Theological and Philosophical College; National Seminary of Catholic Church in China
- Motto: 耶穌是善牧

Chinese name
- Traditional Chinese: 羅雪剛
- Simplified Chinese: 罗雪刚
Transcriptions
Standard Mandarin
- Hanyu Pinyin: Luó Xuégāng

Peter Luo Xuegang (simplified Chinese: 罗雪刚; traditional Chinese: 羅雪剛; born 20 February 1964) is a Sichuanese Roman Catholic priest and Bishop of the Diocese of Suifu since 2012. He is a member of the Chinese Catholic Patriotic Association.

== Biography ==
Luo was born in Renshou County, Sichuan, on February 20, 1964, to a Catholic family. In April 1984 he entered the Sichuan Catholic Theological and Philosophical College, where he graduated in December 1988. Then he was accepted to the Shanghai Sheshan Monastery. From March to December 2004 he studied at the National Seminary of Catholic Church in China.

He was ordained a priest on November 30, 1991. Then he was assigned to the Diocese of Leshan.

He accepted the episcopacy with the papal mandate on November 30, 2011. On December 16, 2012, after the death of his predecessor John Chen Shi-zhong, he became bishop of Suifu.

Catholic Church titles
Previous: John Chen Shi-zhong	Bishop of the Diocese of Suifu; 2012	Incumbent
