= John Lei Jiapei =

Current Catholic bishop of Ningyuan (born 1970)

The Most Reverend John Lei Jiapei
- Bishop of Ningyuan
- Native name: 雷家培
- Church: Cathedral of the Angels, Xichang
- Diocese: Ningyuan
- Predecessor: Michael Xie Chaogang

Orders
- Ordination: 1995
- Consecration: 2016 by John Fang Xingyao

Personal details
- Born: 1970 (age 55–56)
- Denomination: Catholic Church

John Lei Jiapei (Chinese: 雷家培; pinyin: Léi Jiāpéi, born June 1970) is a Chinese Catholic priest and the bishop of the Diocese of Ningyuan since 2016.

== Biography ==
Lei was born in June 1970 and ordained as a priest in 1995. He became the diocesan administrator of Xichang after the death of Michael Xie Chaogang in 1999. In 2010, he was elected as a bishop candidate.

In 2011, Lei was recorded singing Chinese Communist Party songs on stage while wearing vestments. According to UCA News, Lei became "infamous among Catholics across China" for this sacrilegious act. There were also rumors of sexual misconduct about Lei.

In 2015, the Holy See appointed Lei as an apostolic administrator. However, his status remained problematic and became a part of the 2016 Vatican-Beijing talks.

On 2 December 2016, Lei was ordained a bishop by John Fang Xingyao, bishop of Yizhou and president of the Catholic Patriotic Association. Bishops Paul Xiao Zejiang and Paul He Zeqing assisted the ordination, which took place at the Cathedral of the Angels, Xichang. Bishops Joseph Tang Yuange and Paul Lei Shiyin (excommunicated at the time) also attended the ceremony. The ordination happened under strict security measures, with security checks, no electronic devices, and police in plain clothes. About 800 people watched his ordination ceremony from the LED screen outside of the church.

Upon ordination, Lei said that he hoped to lead his diocese in "paying importance to evangelization". On the next day, the feast day of Saint Francis Xavier, Lei celebrated his first mass as a bishop.

== See also ==
- Political music in China
- China–Holy See relations
- Catholic Church in Sichuan

Catholic Church titles
Preceded by Michael Xie Chaogang	Bishop of Ningyuan; 2016 –	Succeeded by Current
