= Paul Deng Jizhou =

Chinese priest (1905–1990)

- Bishop of the Diocese of Jiading
- Church: Cathedral of the Sacred Heart of Jesus in Leshan
- Archdiocese: Chongqing
- Diocese: Jiading
- Installed: June 9, 1949
- Term ended: August 10, 1990
- Predecessor: Fabian Yu Yuwen
- Successor: Matthew Luo Duxi

Orders
- Ordination: February 9, 1936

Personal details
- Born: November 9, 1905 China
- Died: August 10, 1990 (aged 84) China
- Denomination: Roman Catholic

Paul Deng Jizhou (simplified Chinese: 邓及洲; traditional Chinese: 鄧及洲; pinyin: Dèng Jízhōu; November 9, 1905 – August 10, 1990) was a Sichuanese Roman Catholic priest and Bishop of the Diocese of Jiading between 1949 and 1990.

== Biography ==
Deng was born on November 9, 1905. He was ordained a priest on February 9, 1936, and appointed Bishop of the Diocese of Jiading on June 9, 1949. The bishop's ceremony followed on September 21, 1949, with Archbishop of Chongqing Louis Gabriel Xavier Jantzen as Chief Consulator, shortly before the Communists state was established on October 1 of that same year. He was one of the six Chinese bishops appointed by the Holy See in the same year. The other five are Matthias Duan Yinming, Ignatius Pi Shushi, Simon Lei Zhenxia, Ignatius Kung Pin-Mei and Melchior Zhang Kexing. He died on August 10, 1990.

Catholic Church titles
Previous: Fabian Yu Yuwen	Bishop of the Diocese of Jiading; 1949–1990	Next: Matthew Luo Duxi
