= Chen Shizhong =

Chen Shizhong may refer to:

- Chen Shih-chung (born 1953), Taiwanese politician
- John Chen Shi-zhong (1917–2012), Chinese Roman Catholic bishop
