= Matthew Luo Duxi =

- Bishop of Jiading (Leshan)
- Native name: 羅篤熹
- Church: Catholic Church
- Diocese: Diocese of Jiading (Leshan)
- In office: 21 September 1993 – 4 December 2009
- Predecessor: Paul Deng Jizhou
- Successor: Paul Lei Shiyin

Orders
- Ordination: 29 June 1983
- Consecration: 21 September 1993 by John Chen Shi-zhong

Personal details
- Born: 2 July 1919 Renshou County, Szechwan, Republic of China
- Died: 4 December 2009 (aged 90)

Matthew Luo Duxi (2 July 1919 – 4 December 2009) was the Chinese Patriotic Catholic Association bishop of the Diocese of Jiading in Leshan, Sichuan, China.

Ordained a priest in 1983, he was chosen by the Chinese Patriotic Catholic Association to be bishop and was ordained in 1993. The Vatican later gave its approval.

== See also ==
- Catholic Church in Sichuan

== Notes ==
Catholic Church titles
Previous: Paul Deng Jizhou	Bishop of the Diocese of Jiading; 1993–2009	Next: Paul Lei Shiyin
