= Cathedral of the Angels, Xichang =

- Yong'an Catholic Church; Xichang Catholic Church
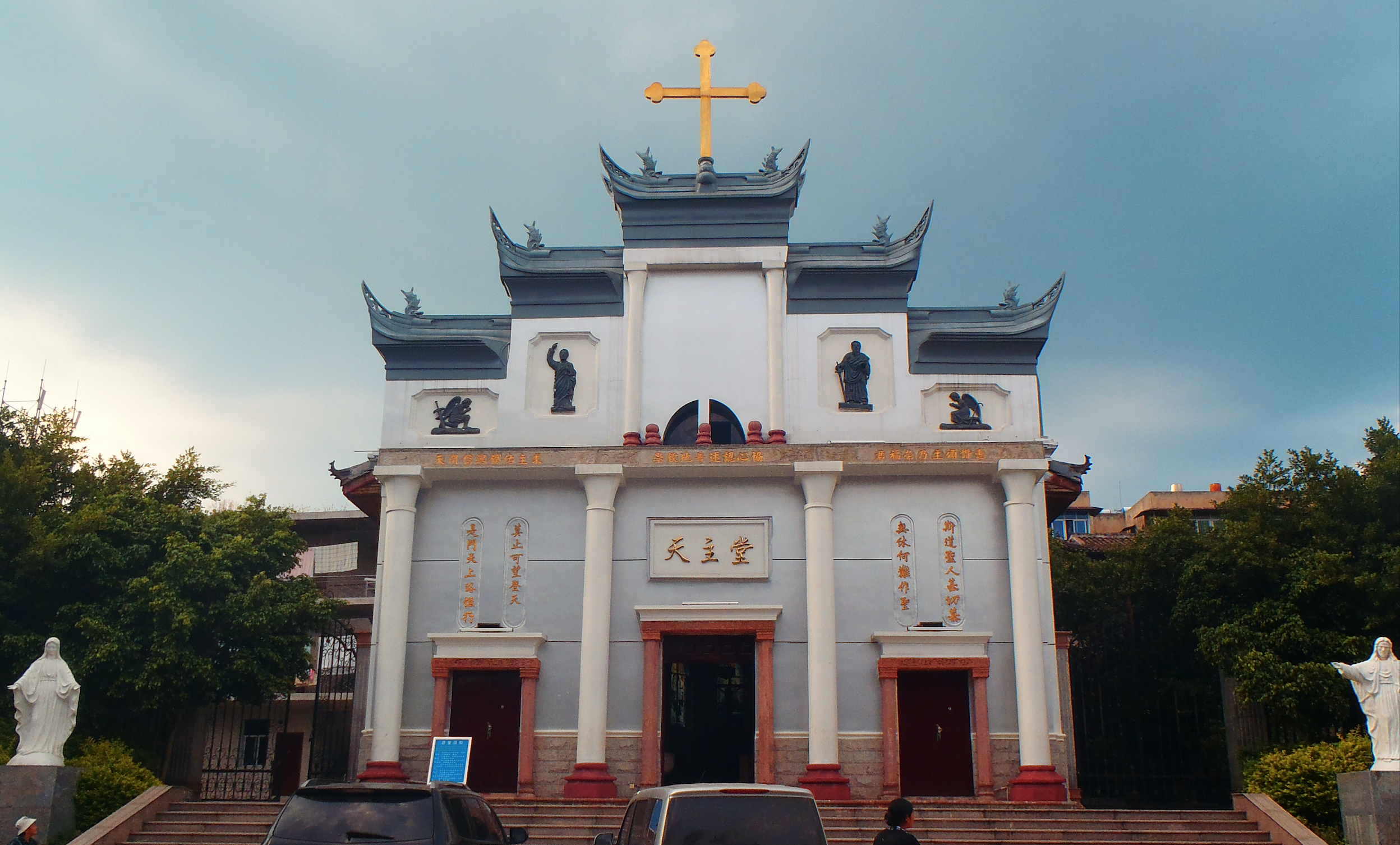
- The cathedral in 2013
- Cathedral of the Angels, Xichang
- 27°53′52″N 102°15′56″E
- Location: Sanya Street, Xichang, Liangshan Yi Autonomous Prefecture, Sichuan
- Country: China
- Denomination: Catholic Church

History
- Status: Cathedral
- Founded: 1908
- Founder: Jean de Guébriant
- Dedication: Angels in Christianity

Architecture
- Functional status: Active
- Style: Traditional Sichuanese with Romanesque Revival elements
- Groundbreaking: 1908
- Completed: 1912

Administration
- Archdiocese: Chongqing
- Diocese: Ningyuan

Clergy
- Bishop: John Lei Jiapei

The Cathedral of the Angels (Note: Chinese: 天神堂; pinyin: Tiānshén Táng; Wade–Giles: Tʻien-shên Tʻang; Sichuanese romanization: Tʽien^{1} Shen^{2} Tʽang^{2}, commonly referred to as Xichang Catholic Church (Chinese: 西昌天主堂; pinyin: Xīchāng Tiānzhǔtáng; Wade–Giles: Hsi-chʻang Tʻien-chu-tʻang; Sichuanese romanization: Si^{1} Chʽang^{1} Tʽien^{1} Chu^{3} Tʽang^{2}), also known as Yong'angong Church or Yong'an Catholic Church (Chinese: 永安公敎堂; pinyin: Yǒng'āngōng Jiào Táng; Wade–Giles: Yung-an-kung Chiao Tʻang; Sichuanese romanization: Üin^{3} Ngan^{1} Kong^{1} Chiao^{4} Tʽang^{2}; lit. 'Eternal Peace Temple-Church') during the Republican Era.) is the Roman Catholic cathedral of the Diocese of Ningyuan, situated on Sanya Street, Xichang (formerly known as Ningyuan), capital of Nosu-inhabited Liangshan Yi Autonomous Prefecture in southwestern Sichuan. It has been subjected to the control of the state-sanctioned Chinese Catholic Patriotic Association since 1957.

== Description ==
Roman Catholicism was introduced into Ningyuan, land of the Nosu tribes, in the 18th century. The French missionary Jean de Guébriant was put in charge of the evangelistic work in this region by Paris Foreign Missions Society since 1903. Under Guébriant's supervision, construction of the Cathedral of the Angels started in 1908. The structure consisted of the cathedral, a bell tower, a courtyard and episcopal residence. It was not completed until 1912. The architectural form was inspired by Romanesque Revival architecture, blended with conspicuous traditional style developed in Sichuan, as visible on the "flying cornices" on the top of the cathedral's façade, which are distinct from those found in other provinces of China.

The bell tower was built on the east side of the cathedral with a cross on the top, which originally housed a bell cast in France. The bell tower was destroyed in 1968 during the sociopolitical purge movement of Cultural Revolution.

== Gallery ==
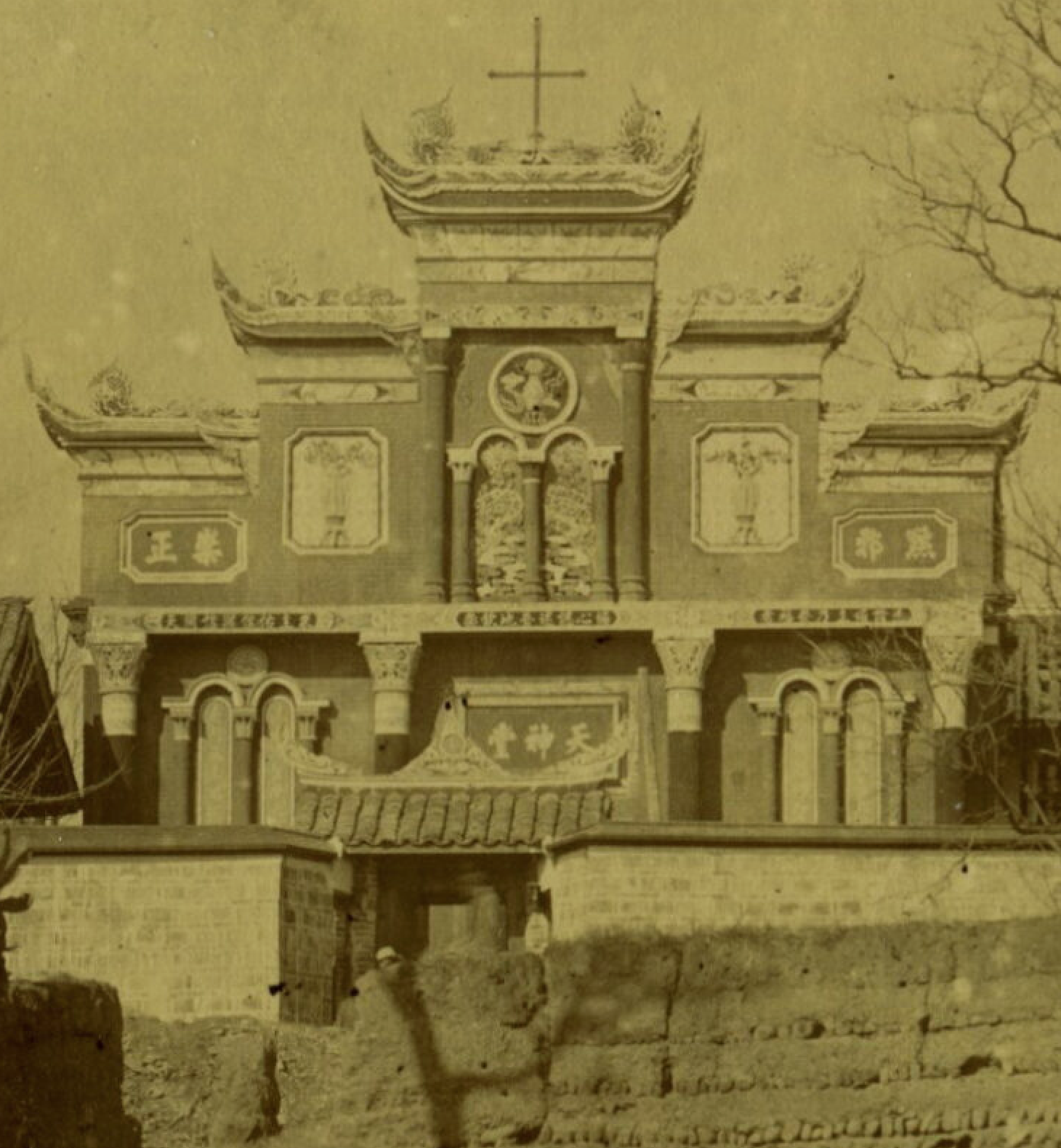
Detail of the cathedral circa 1920

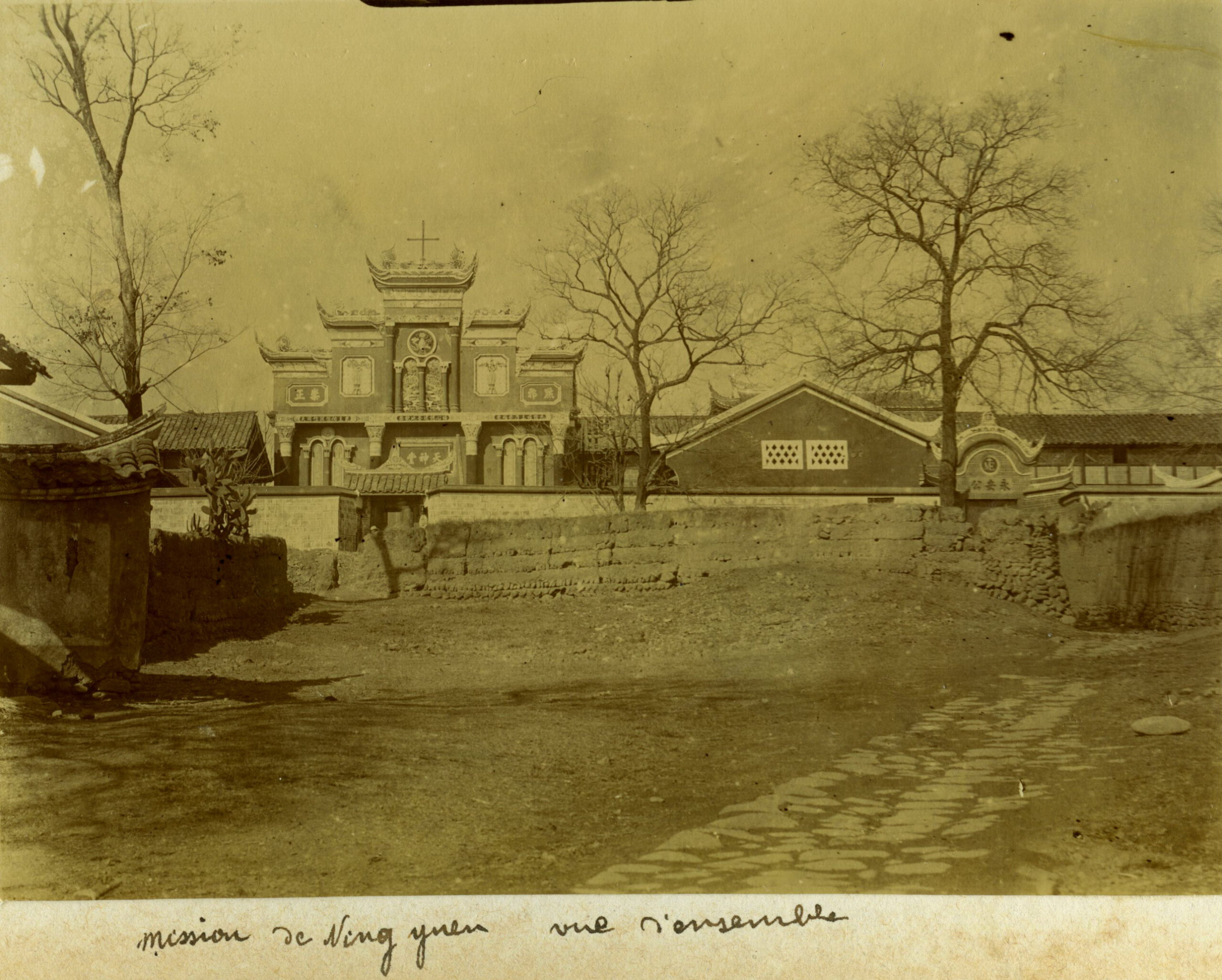
The cathedral complex circa 1920

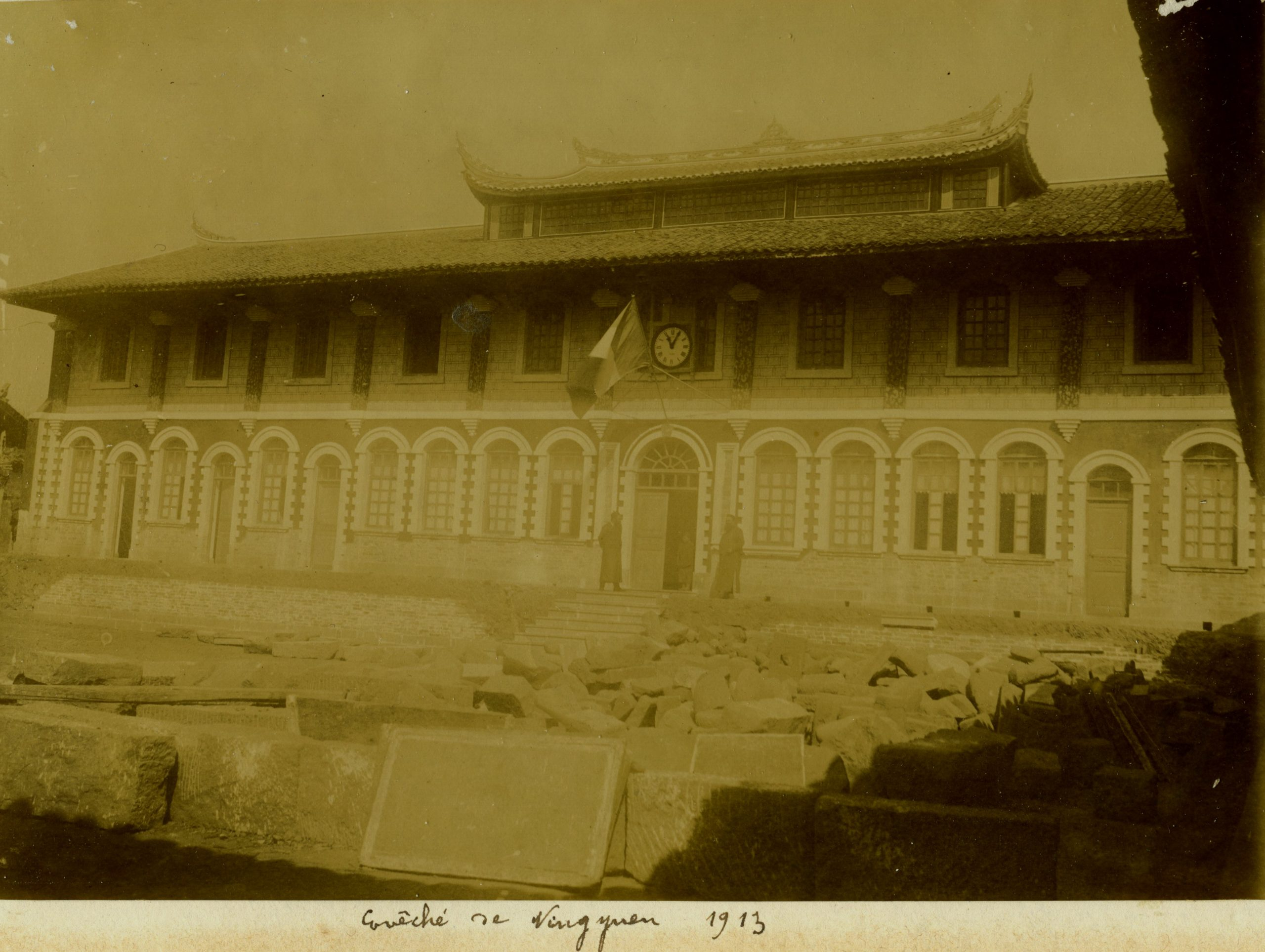
The episcopal residence in 1913

== See also ==
- Catholic Church in Sichuan
- St. Joseph's Cathedral, Chongqing
- Immaculate Conception Cathedral, Chengdu
