= Eugène-Jean-Claude-Joseph Desflèches =

The Most Reverend Eugène-Jean-Claude-Joseph Desflèches
- Titular Archbishop of Claudiopolis in Honoriade; Vicar Apostolic Emeritus of Eastern Szechwan
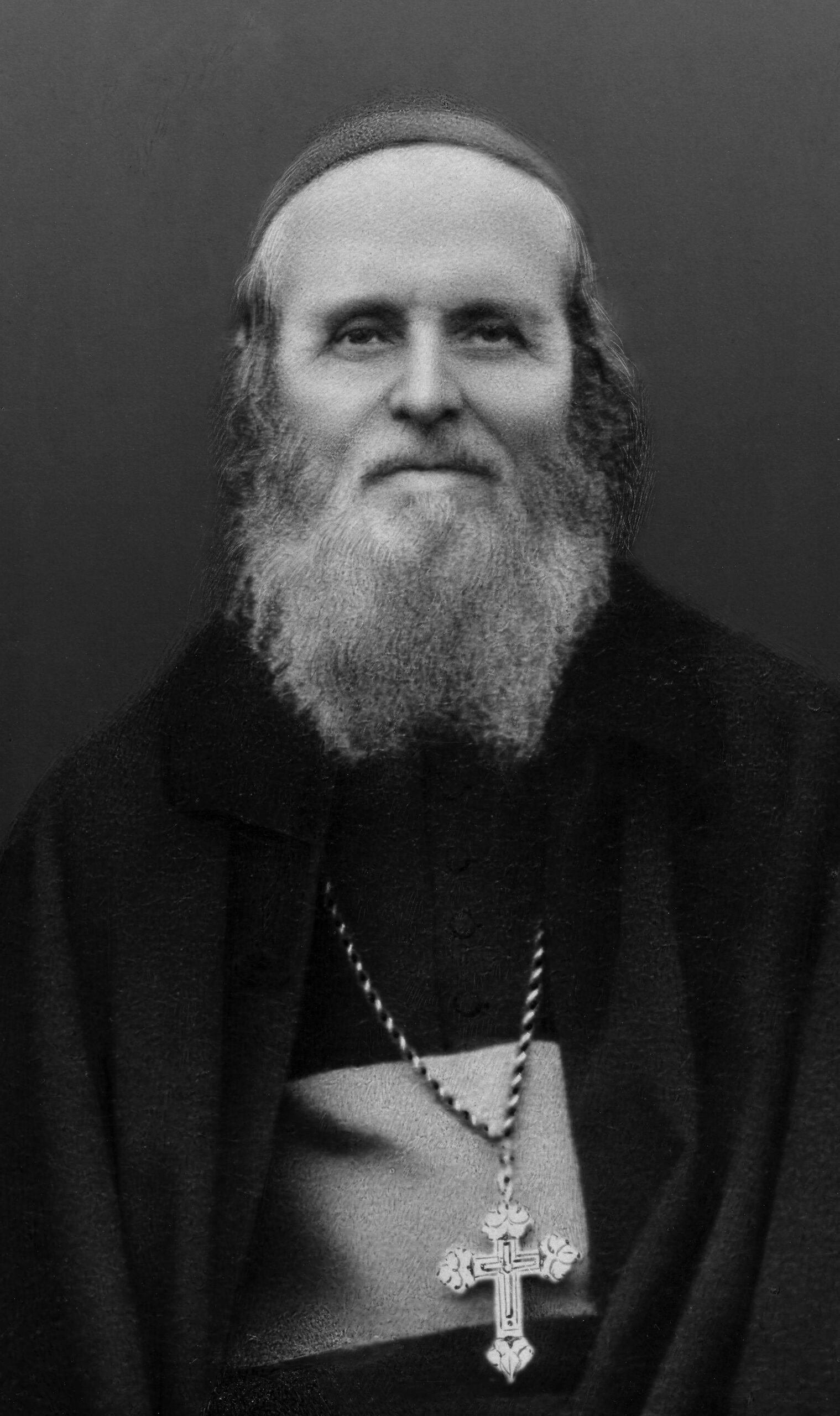
- Church: Catholic Church
- Diocese: Apostolic Vicariate of Eastern Szechwan
- In office: 1856–1883
- Predecessor: None
- Successor: Eugène-Paul Coupat
- Previous post: Titular Bishop of Sinitis (1840–1883)

Orders
- Ordination: 23 Dec 1837
- Consecration: 28 Apr 1844 by Jacques-Léonard Pérocheau

Personal details
- Born: 13 Feb 1814 Jonage, France
- Died: 8 Nov 1887 (age 73) Montbeton, France
- Motto: Ite docete
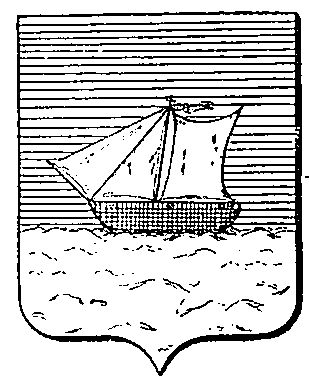
- Coat of arms

Eugène-Jean-Claude-Joseph Desflèches, M.E.P. (Chinese name: 范若瑟; 1814–1887) was a Roman Catholic prelate who served as Titular Archbishop of Claudiopolis in Honoriade (1883–1887), Vicar Apostolic of Eastern Szechwan (1856–1883), and Titular Bishop of Sinitis (1840–1883).

== Biography ==
Eugène-Jean-Claude-Joseph Desflèches was born in Jonage, France on 13 Feb 1814 and ordained a priest in the Paris Foreign Missions Society on 23 Dec 1837. On 18 Dec 1840, he was appointed during the papacy of Pope Gregory XVI as Titular Bishop of Sinitis. On 28 Apr 1844, he was consecrated bishop by Jacques-Léonard Pérocheau, Titular Bishop of Maxula Prates. On 2 Apr 1856, he was appointed during the papacy of Pope Pius IX as Vicar Apostolic of Eastern Szechwan. He served as Vicar Apostolic of Eastern Szechwan until his resignation on 11 Feb 1883. On 20 Feb 1883, he was appointed during the papacy of Pope Leo XIII as Titular Archbishop of Claudiopolis in Honoriade. He died on 8 Nov 1887.

== Episcopal succession ==
Episcopal succession of Eugène-Jean-Claude-Joseph Desflèches

While bishop, he was the principal consecrator of:

- Etienne-Raymond Albrand, Titular Bishop of Sura and Vicar Apostolic of Kuiceu (1849);
- Jacques-Léon Thomine-Desmazures, Titular Bishop of Sinopoli and Vicar Apostolic of Thibet (1857);
- Louis-Simon Faurie, Titular Bishop of Apollonia and Vicar Apostolic of Kuiceu (1860);
- Pierre-Maria-Joseph-Julien Pichon, Titular Bishop of Helenopolis in Bithynia and Vicar Apostolic of Southern Szechwan (1861);
- François-Eugène Lions, Titular Bishop of Basilinopolis and Vicar Apostolic of Kuiceu (1872);

and assisted in the consecration of:

- Joseph Ponsot, Titular Bishop of Philomelium and Vicar Apostolic of Yünnan (1843).

== See also ==
- Catholic Church in Sichuan

Catholic Church titles
Preceded by Giacomo Luigi Fontana	Titular Bishop of Sinitis; 1840–1883	Succeeded by Bernardo Gaetani d'Aragona
Preceded by None	Vicar Apostolic of Eastern Szechwan; 1856–1883	Succeeded by Eugène-Paul Coupat
Preceded by Carlo Gigli	Titular Archbishop of Claudiopolis in Honoriade; 1883–1887	Succeeded by Joseph-Adolphe Gandy
