= St. Joseph's Cathedral, Chongqing =

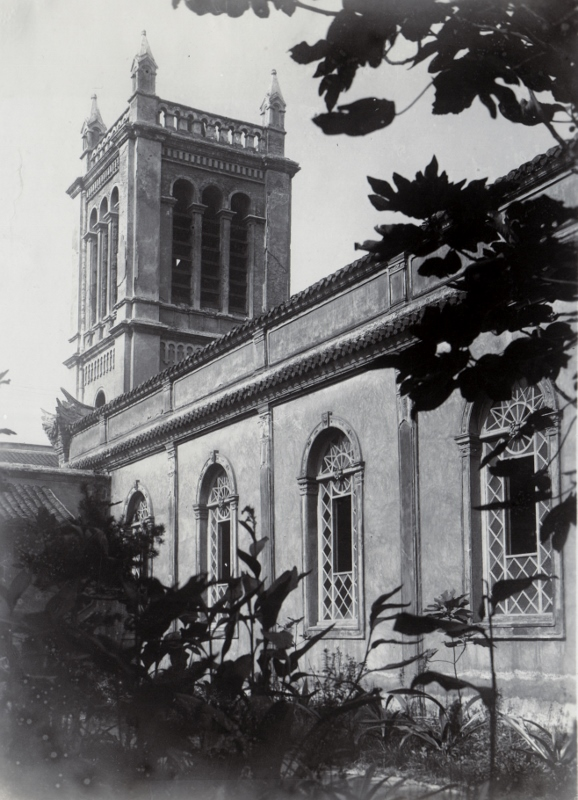
- The cathedral in the 1920s
- St. Joseph's Cathedral, Chongqing
- Location: 1 St Joseph Lane, 272 Minsheng Road, Yuzhong District, Chongqing
- Country: China
- Denomination: Catholic Church

History
- Status: Cathedral
- Founder: Paris Foreign Missions Society
- Dedication: Saint Joseph

Architecture
- Functional status: Active
- Style: Gothic Revival
- Groundbreaking: 1879
- Completed: 1891 (cathedral); 1893 (bell tower)

Administration
- Archdiocese: Chongqing

Clergy
- Bishop: Andrew Ding Yang

The Cathedral of St Joseph (Note: simplified Chinese: 圣若瑟主教座堂; traditional Chinese: 聖若瑟主敎座堂; Sichuanese romanization: Shen^{4} Ro^{5} Se^{4} Chu^{3} Chiao^{4} Tso^{4} Tʽang^{2}; or simply 若瑟堂.) is the Roman Catholic cathedral of the Archdiocese of Chongqing, situated on St Joseph Lane, Minsheng Road in Yuzhong District of the city of Chongqing, West China. It has been subjected to the control of the state-sanctioned Catholic Patriotic Association since 1957.

== History ==
The cathedral was built in the late 19th century by French missionaries of the Paris Foreign Missions Society. The construction started in 1879 and was completed in 1891, a bell tower was added to the building in 1893. It has a square tower with a clock and is covered in ivy.

== Gallery ==
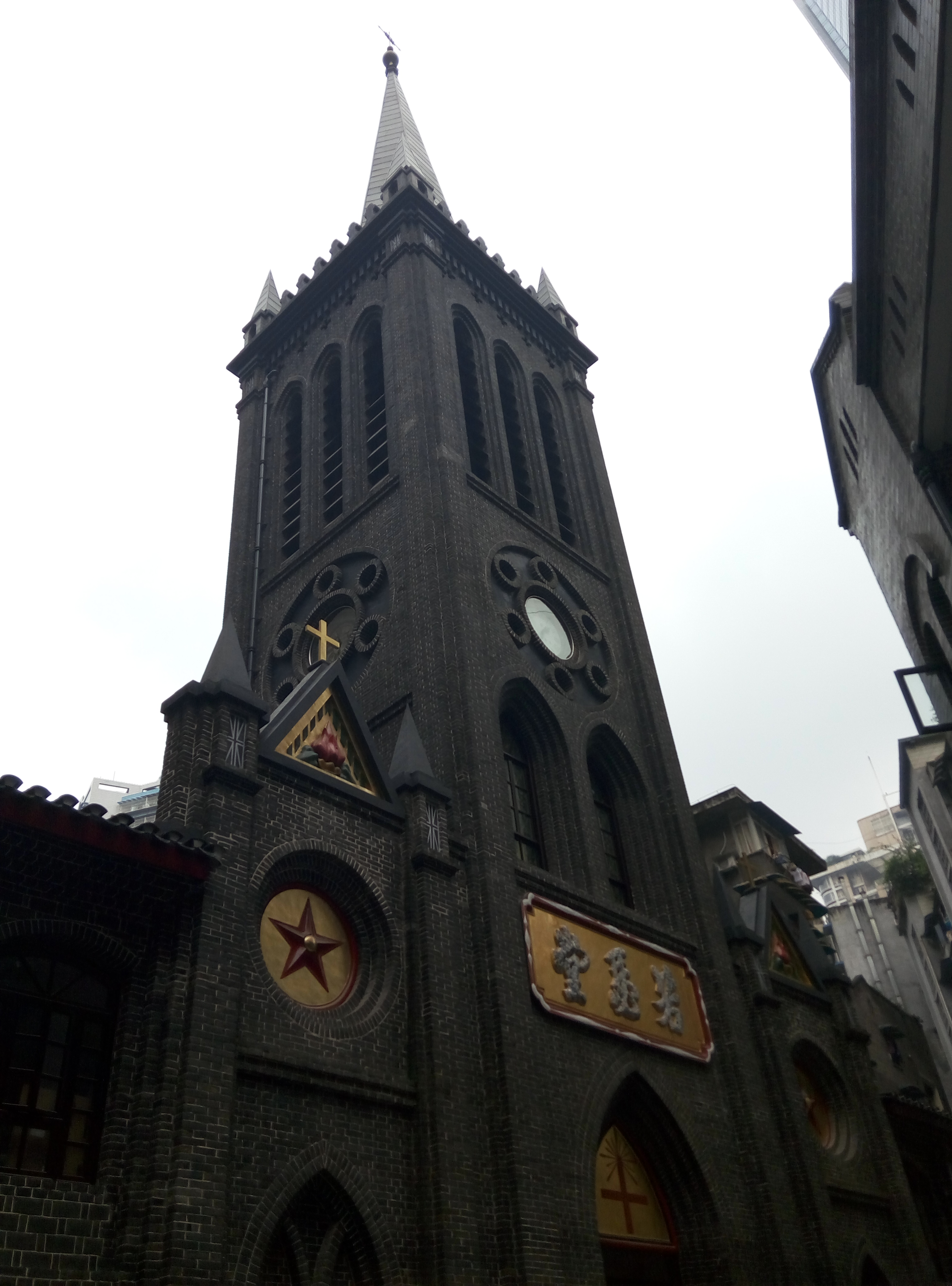
The cathedral tower in 2015

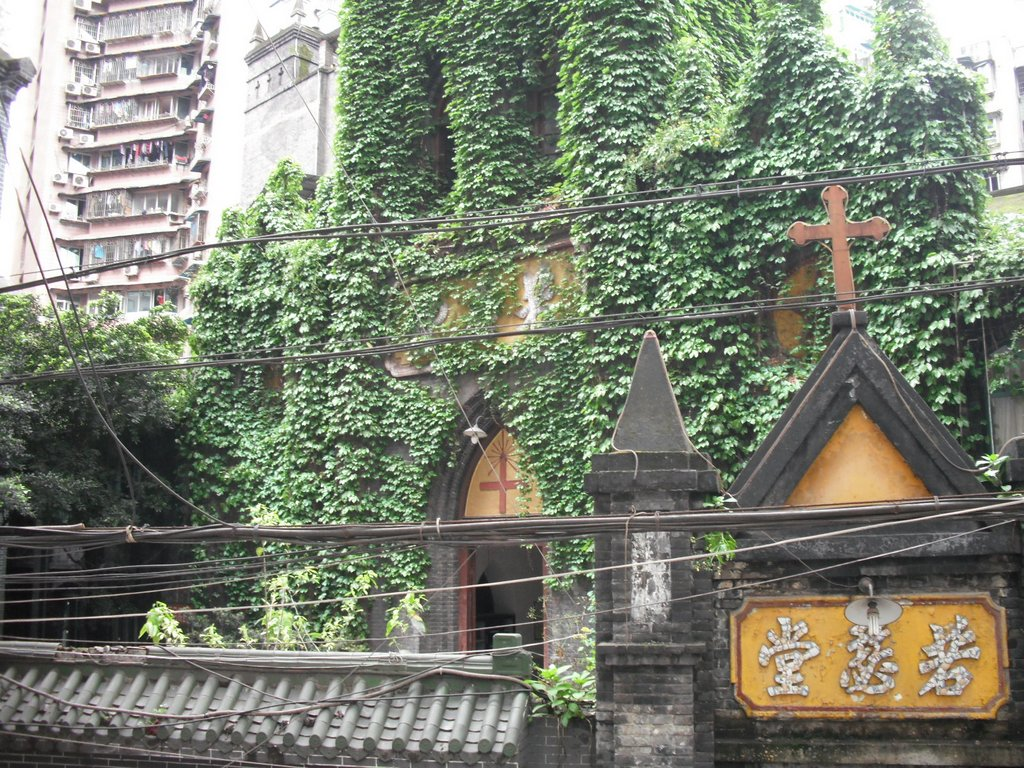
The ivy-covered cathedral in 2013

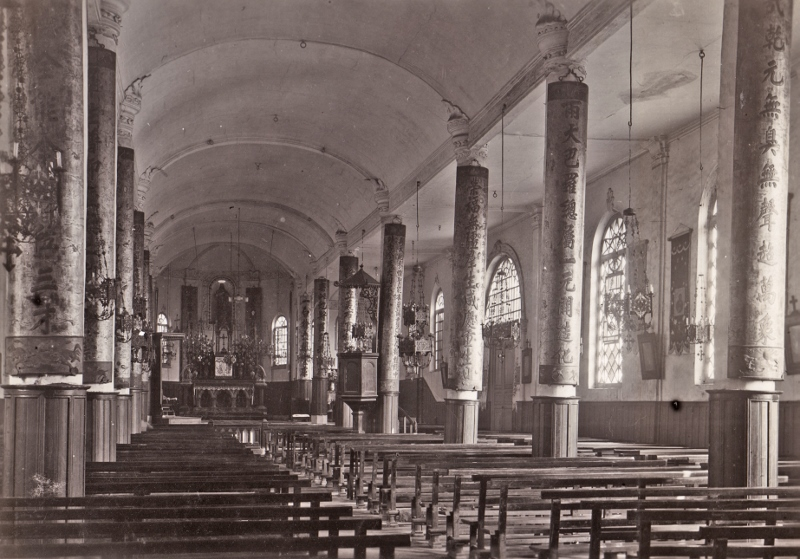
Interior view in the 1920s

== See also ==
- Catholic Church in Sichuan
- Cathedral of the Angels, Xichang
- Immaculate Conception Cathedral, Chengdu
