= Diocese of Ningyuan =

Roman Catholic diocese in China

Diocese of Ningyuan Dioecesis Nimiuenensis 天主教甯遠教區 天主教宁远教区
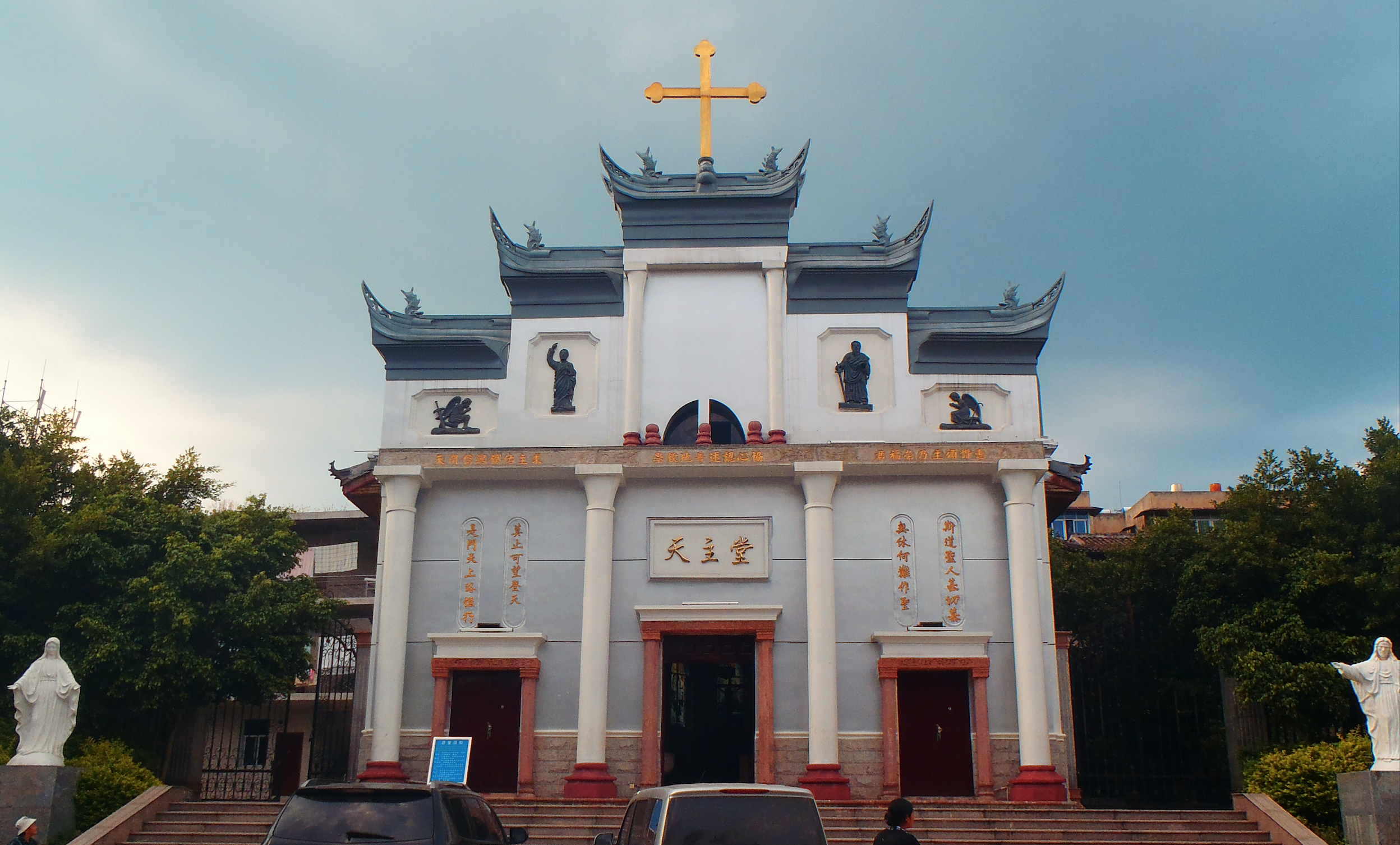
- Cathedral of the Angels, Xichang

Location
- Country: China
- Ecclesiastical province: Chongqing
- Metropolitan: Chongqing

Statistics
- Area: 120,000 km^{2} (46,000 sq mi)
- Population: Total; Catholics: (as of 1950); 2,000,000; 11,143 (0.6%)

Information
- Denomination: Catholic Church
- Sui iuris church: Latin Church
- Rite: Roman Rite
- Established: August 12, 1910 (as apostolic vicariate)
- Cathedral: Cathedral of the Angels, Xichang

Current leadership
- Pope: Leo XIV
- Bishop: John Lei Jiapei
- Metropolitan Archbishop: Sede vacante

Map
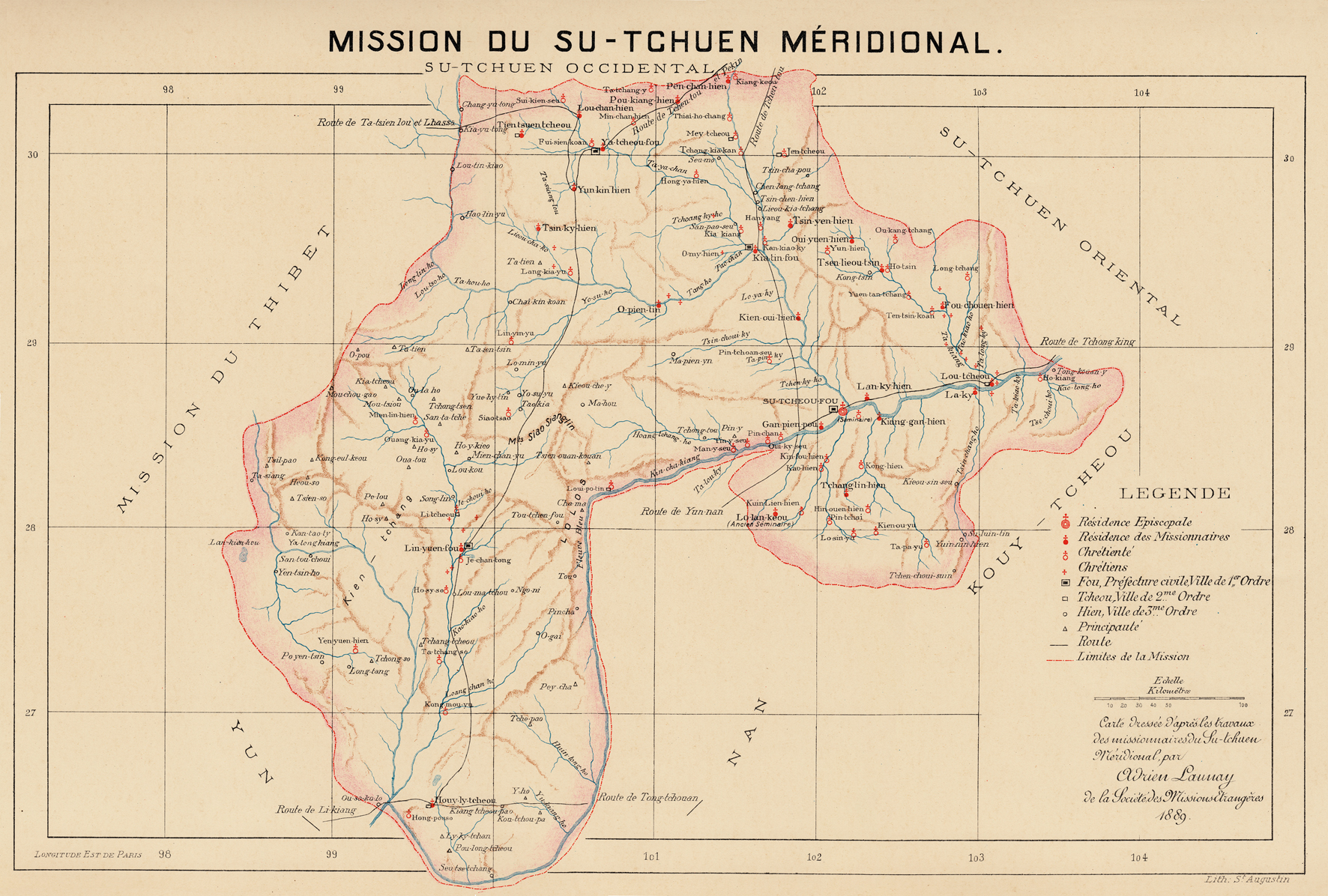
- Ningyuan (Lin-yuen-fou) was part of the Southern Szechwan Mission. Map by Adrien Launay MEP, 1889.

The Diocese of Ningyuan (Latin: Dioecesis Nimiuenensis; Chinese: 天主教甯遠教區), also known as Diocese of Xichang or Sichang, is a Latin Catholic diocese located in the city of Xichang (formerly known as Ningyuan or Kienchang) in the ecclesiastical province of Chongqing in western China. It was established on August 12, 1910 as the Apostolic Vicariate of Kienchang for the Mission of Sichuan (Szechwan) in the province's Nosuland.

== Territory ==
The Diocese of Ningyuan covers the cities of Xichang (Lin-yuen-fou) and Panzhihua, the counties of Dechang, Huidong, Huili (Houy-ly-tcheou), Mianning, Miyi, Yanyuan (Yen-yuen-hien), and some surrounding villages, totaling 120,000 square kilometers. It is bordered by the Diocese of Kangding to the west and northwest, Diocese of Suifu to the east, Diocese of Jiading to the northeast, Diocese of Dali to the southwest, and Archdiocese of Kunming to the east and south.

== History ==
- August 12, 1910: Established as Apostolic Vicariate of Kienchang (Kien-tchang) from the Apostolic Vicariate of Southern Szechwan
- December 3, 1924: Renamed as Apostolic Vicariate of Ningyuanfu (Vicariatus Apostolicus Nimiuenensis; Lin-yuen-fou)
- April 11, 1946: Promoted as Diocese of Ningyuan (Dioecesis Nimiuenensis)

One of the headquarters of the Spanish Redemptorist missions in Sichuan was based in the Apostolic Vicariate of Ningyuanfu.

== Bishops ==
Vicars Apostolic of Kienchang

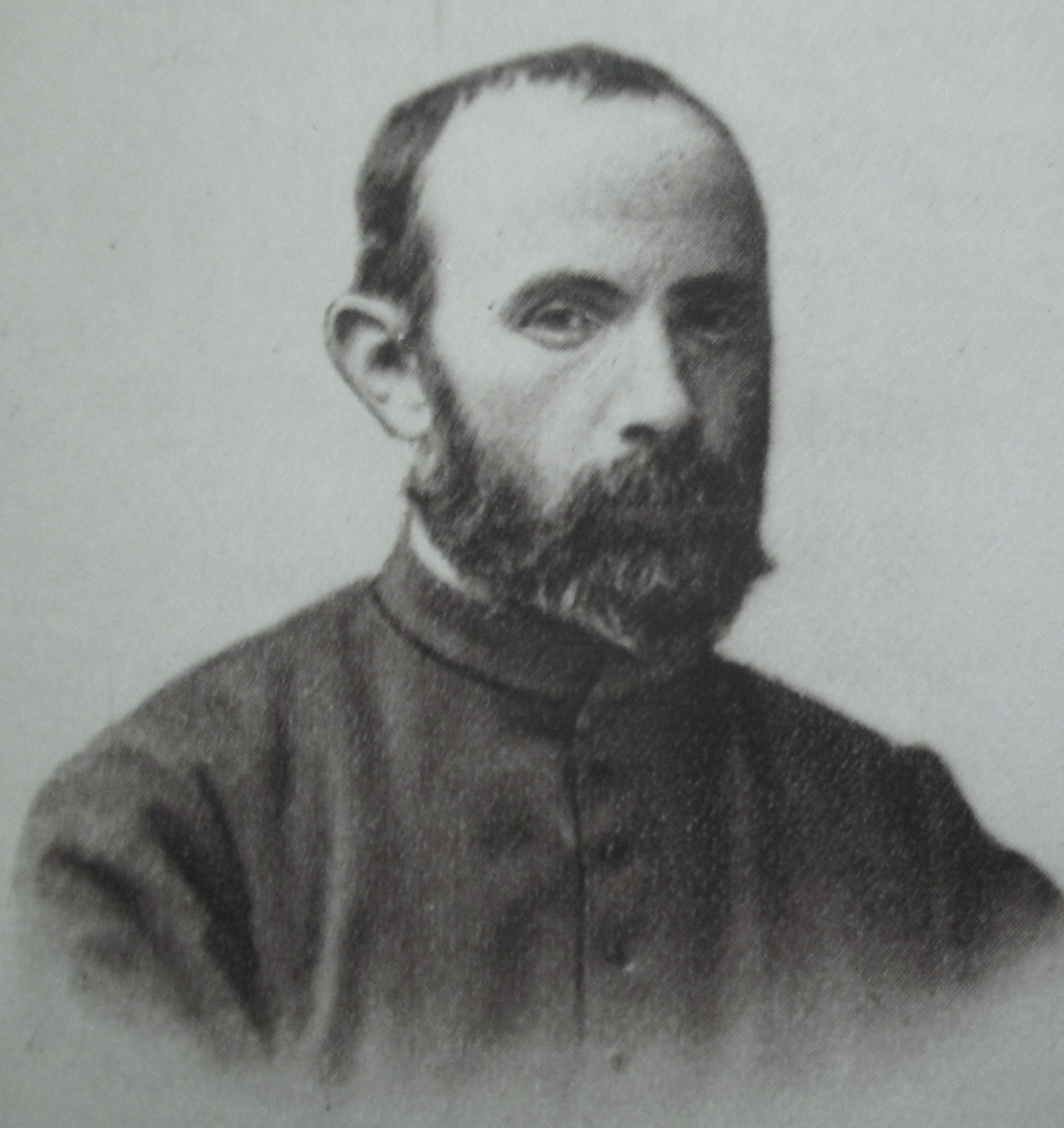
Jean de Guébriant, first Vicar Apostolic of Kienchang

- Jean de Guébriant, M.E.P. (later Archbishop) (August 12, 1910 – April 28, 1916)
- Joseph Bourgain, M.E.P. (March 31, 1918 – December 3, 1924)

Vicars Apostolic of Ningyuanfu

- Joseph Bourgain, M.E.P. (December 3, 1924 – September 30, 1925)
- Stanislas-Gabriel-Henri Baudry, M.E.P. (March 18, 1927 – April 11, 1946)

Bishops of Ningyuan

- Stanislas-Gabriel-Henri Baudry, M.E.P. (April 11, 1946 – August 6, 1954)
- Sede vacante
- Michael Xie Chaogang (May 5, 1991 – January 2, 1999), without papal mandate
- John Lei Jiapei (December 2, 2016 – present)

== Gallery ==
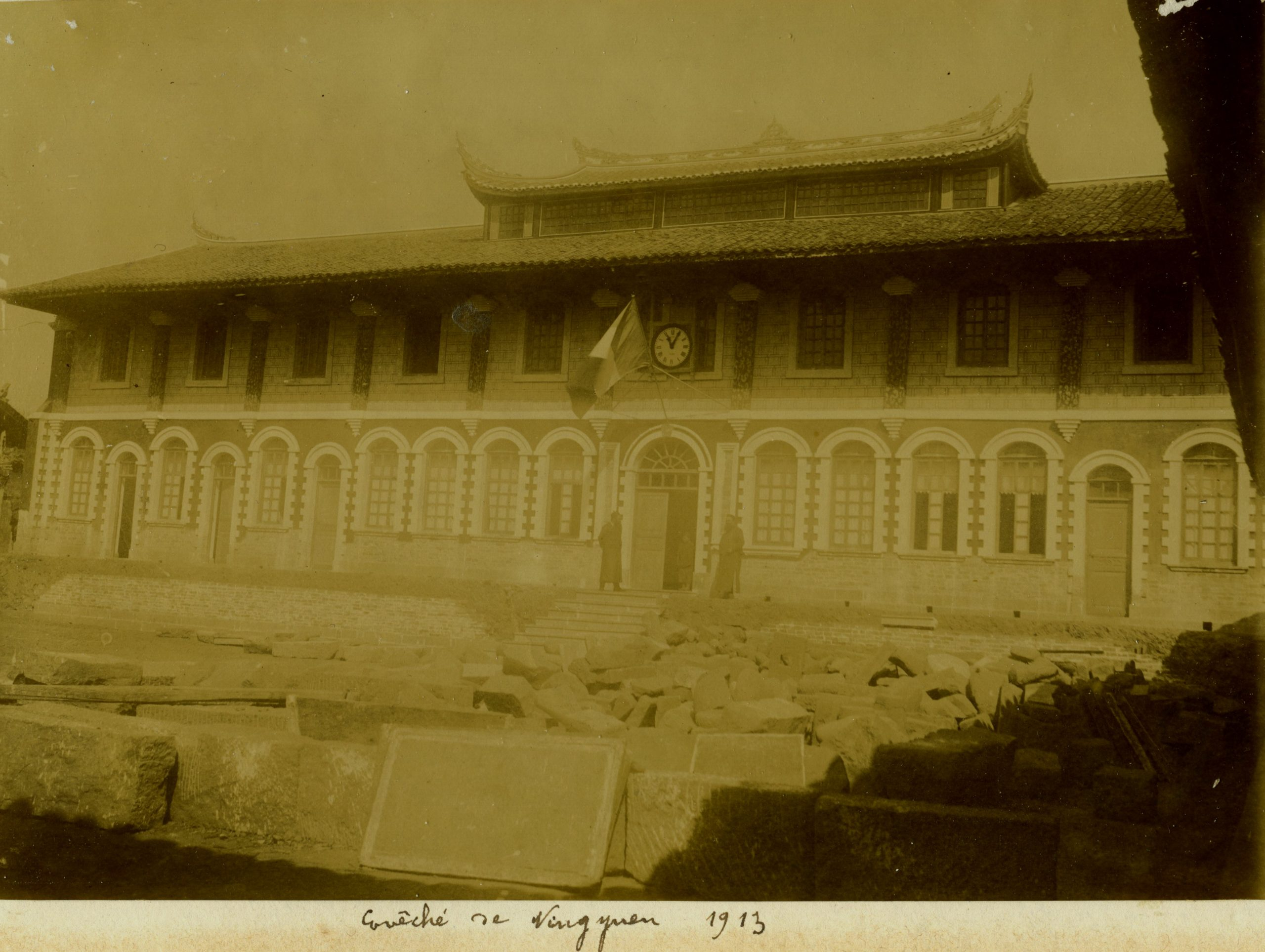
Episcopal see of Ningyuen, 1913.

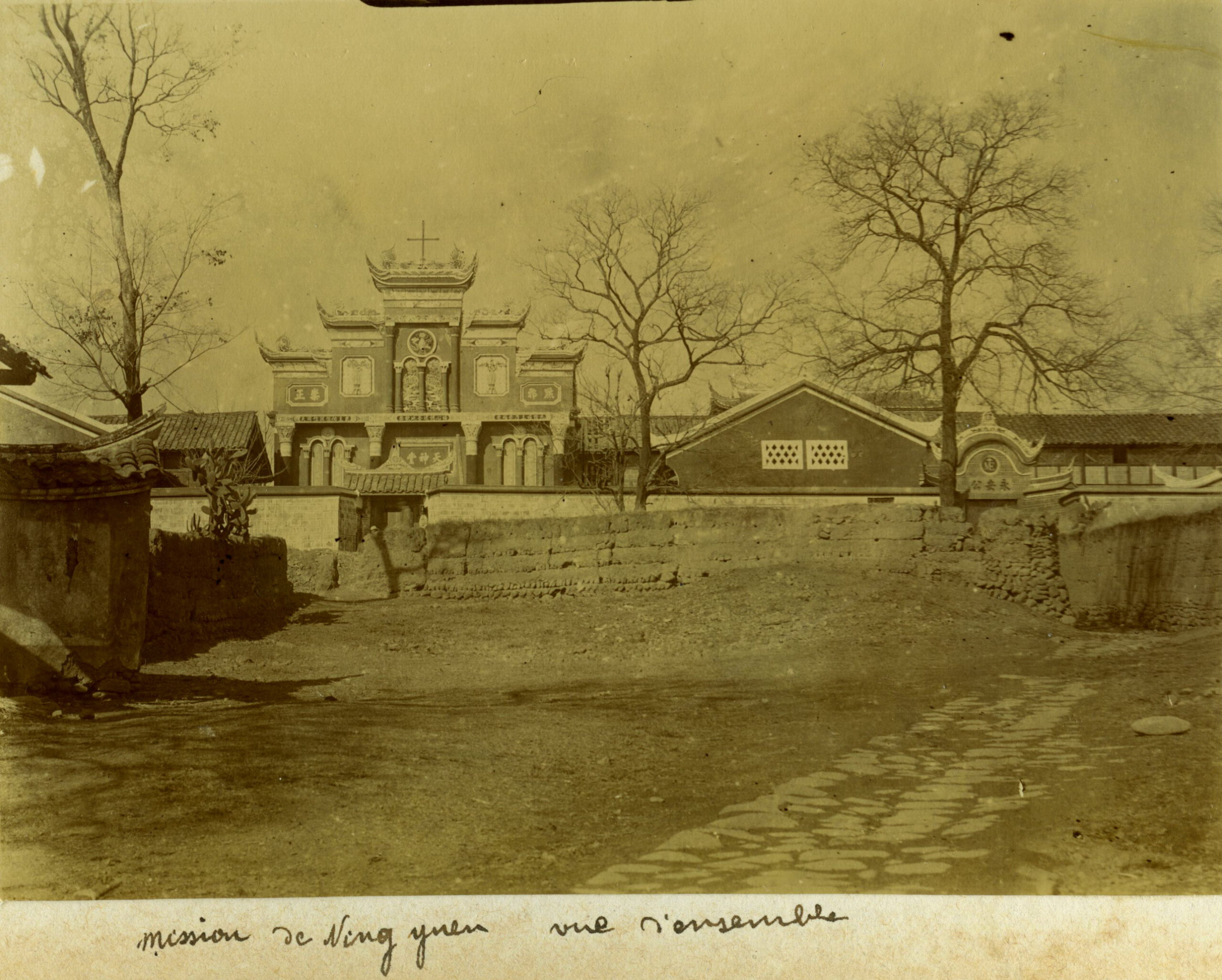
Cathedral of the Angels, c. 1920.

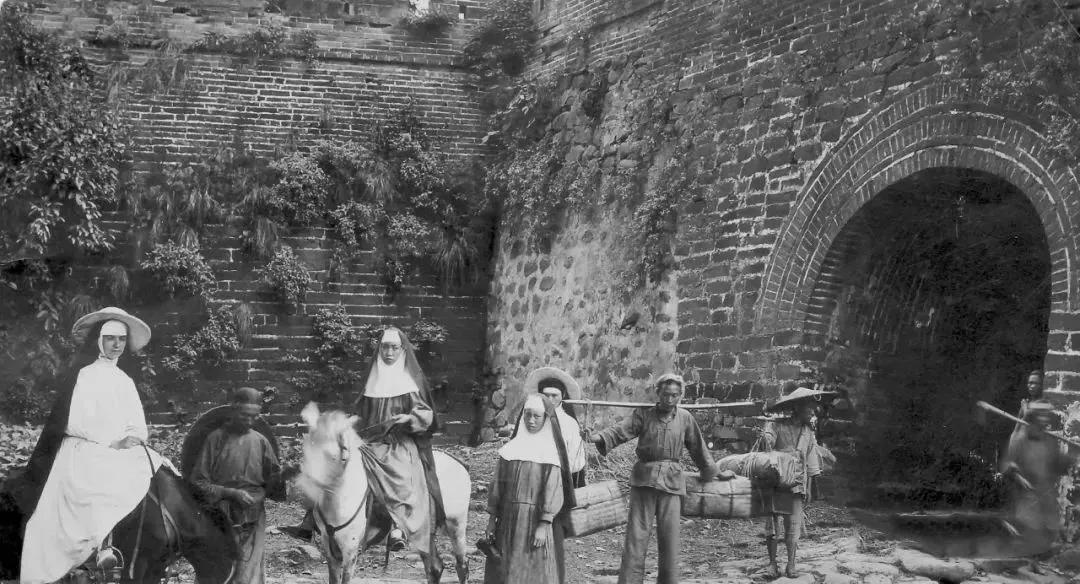
Catholic nuns, possibly French, at the South Gate of Kienchang, before 1949.

== See also ==
- Anglican Diocese of Szechwan
- Joche Albert Ly – Superior of the Marist Brothers at Xichang
- Juan Campos Rodríguez – Spanish Redemptorist missionary ministering in Xichang
