= Phasis (titular see) =

Roman Catholic titular see

Phasis was an ancient and early medieval city on the eastern Black Sea coast, near modern Poti in Georgia.

After the introduction of Christianity, Phasis was the see of a Greek diocese which one of its bishops, Cyrus, became a Patriarch of Alexandria between AD 630 and 641.

== Titular see ==
In 1929, the diocese was nominally restored as a Latin titular archbishopric of the highest (Metropolitan) rank.

It is vacant since decades, having had the following archiepiscopal incumbents:

- Constantino Ajutti (1925.05.28 – death 1928.07.29) as papal diplomat: Apostolic Delegate (below embassy level) to (then French) Indochina (1925.05.28 – 1928.07.29)
- William Mark Duke (1928.08.10 – 1931.10.05) as Coadjutor Archbishop of Vancouver (British Columbia, Canada) (1928.08.10 – 1931.10.05), later succeeded as Metropolitan Archbishop of Vancouver (1931.10.05 – 1964.03.11), emeritate as Titular Archbishop of Seleucia in Isauria (1964.03.11 – 1971.08.31)
- Geevarghese Ivanios Giorgio Tommaso Panickerveetil, Order of the Imitation of Christ (O.I.C.) (1932.02.13 – 1932.06.11) as former Founder (1919) and first Superior General of Order of the Imitation of Christ (1919 – 1932.02.13); next first Metropolitan of Trivandrum of the Syro-Malankars (southern India, Syro-Malankar Rite) (1932.06.11 – death 1953.07.15)
- Jacques Leen, Holy Ghost Fathers (C.S.Sp.) (1933.08.01 – death 1949.12.19), as personal promotion and on emeritate as former Titular Bishop of Hippo Diarrhytus (1925.07.15 – 1926.04.16) and Coadjutor Bishop of Port-Louis (Mauritius) (1925.07.15 – 1926.04.16), succeeding as Bishop of Port-Louis (1926.04.16 – 1949.12.19), then Archbishop ad personam (1933.08.01 – 1949.12.19)
- Louis-Gabriel-Xavier Jantzen (尚唯善), Paris Foreign Missions Society (M.E.P.) (1950.10.24 – death 1953.08.28); emeritate as former Titular Bishop of Tremithus (1926.02.16 – 1946.04.11) and last Apostolic Vicar of Chungking 重慶 (China) (1926.02.16 – 1946.04.11) promoted as first Metropolitan Archbishop of Chungking 重慶 (1946.04.11 – 1950.10.24)
- Henri Audrain (1954.02.03 – 1955.03.02) as Coadjutor Archbishop of Auch (France) (1954.02.03 – 1955.03.02), succeeded as Metropolitan Archbishop of Auch (1955.03.02 – 1968.04.16), emeritate as Titular Archbishop of Mimiana (1968.04.16 – resigned 1970.12.10), died 1982; previously Titular Bishop of Arsinoë in Arcadia (1938.10.22 – 1954.02.03) as Auxiliary Bishop of Versailles (France) (1938.10.22 – 1954.02.03)
- Arturo Mery Beckdorf (1955.04.20 – death 1976.05.28), first as Coadjutor Archbishop of Santiago (Chile) (1955.04.20 – 1961.05.14), then as Auxiliary Bishop of La Serena (Chile) (1961.05.14 – 1963), next as Coadjutor Archbishop of La Serena (1963 – 1976.05.28); previously Titular Bishop of Parnassus (1941.03.22 – 1944.07.29) as Auxiliary Bishop of Antofagasta (Chile) (1941.03.22 – 1944.07.29)
