= Diocese of Wanxian =

Roman Catholic diocese in China

Diocese of Wanxian Dioecesis Uanscienensis 天主教萬縣教區 天主教万县教区

Location
- Country: China
- Ecclesiastical province: Chongqing
- Metropolitan: Chongqing

Statistics
- Area: 20,000 km^{2} (7,700 sq mi)
- Population: Total; Catholics: (as of 2009); 1,700,000; 60,000 (3.5%)

Information
- Denomination: Catholic Church
- Sui iuris church: Latin Church
- Rite: Roman Rite
- Established: August 2, 1929 (as apostolic vicariate)
- Cathedral: Cathedral of the Immaculate Conception, Wanzhou

Current leadership
- Pope: Leo XIV
- Bishop: Paul He Zeqing
- Metropolitan Archbishop: Sede vacante

Map
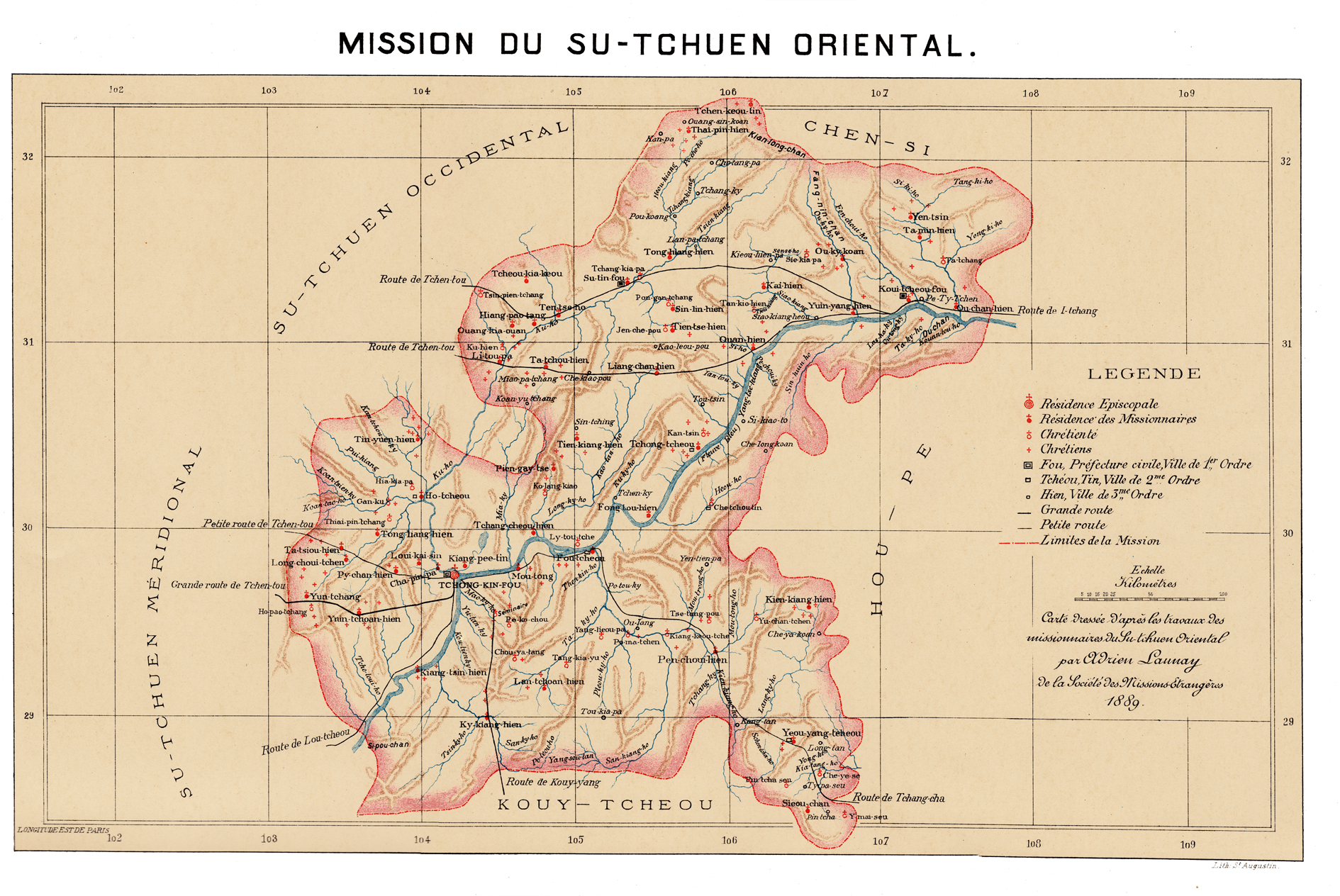
- Wanxian (Ouan-hien) was part of the Eastern Szechwan Mission. Map prepared by Adrien Launay, 1889.

The Diocese of Wanxian (formerly spelled Wanhsien; Latin: Dioecesis Uanscienensis; Chinese: 天主教萬縣教區), also known as Diocese of Wanzhou, is a Latin Catholic diocese located in Wanzhou District (formerly Wanxian), Chongqing in the ecclesiastical province of Chongqing, in the easternmost part of western China. It was established on August 2, 1929 as the Apostolic Vicariate of Wanhsien for the Mission of Sichuan (Szechwan).

== Territory ==
The Diocese of Wanxian covers Wanzhou District (Ouan-hien) and eight counties in the mountainous area of northern Chongqing, namely, Chengkou, Fengjie, Kaixian, Liangping, Wushan, Wuxi, Yunyang and Zhongxian, totaling approximately 20,000 square kilometers. It is bordered by the Diocese of Shunqing to the west, Diocese of Shinan to the east, Apostolic Prefecture of Xing'anfu to the north, and Archdiocese of Chongqing to the south and southwest.

== History ==
- August 2, 1929: Established as Apostolic Vicariate of Wanhsien (Ouan-hien) from the Apostolic Vicariate of Chungking (Chongqing; Tchong-kin-fou)
- April 11, 1946: Promoted as Diocese of Wanhsien

== Special churches ==
- Sacred Heart Church at Longbao (龍寶鎭聖心堂), a town located in the suburbs of Wanxian.

== Bishops ==
Vicar Apostolic of Wanhsien

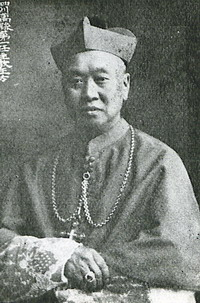
Francis Xavier Wang Zepu, first Vicar Apostolic of Wanhsien

- Francis Xavier Wang Zepu (Wang Tse-pu) (December 16, 1929 – April 11, 1946)

Bishop of Wanhsien

- Francis Xavier Wang Zepu (Wang Tse-pu) (April 11, 1946 – July 3, 1947)

Bishops of Wanxian

- Matthias Duan Yinming (Tuan In-Min) (June 9, 1949 – January 10, 2001)
- Joseph Xu Zhixuan (Appointed Coadjutor Bishop July 31, 1989; succeeded as ordinary on Jan 10, 2001; died Dec 8, 2008)
- Paul He Zeqing (December 13, 2008 – Present)

== See also ==
- Anglican Diocese of Szechwan
