= Paul He Zeqing =

- Bishop of the Diocese of Wanxian
- Native name: 何泽清
- Province: Sichuan
- Installed: 2008
- Predecessor: Joseph Xu Zhixuan

Orders
- Ordination: 2005

Personal details
- Born: March 1968 (age 58) Wanzhou District, Chongqing, China
- Denomination: Roman Catholic

Chinese name
- Traditional Chinese: 何澤清
- Simplified Chinese: 何泽清
Transcriptions
Standard Mandarin
- Hanyu Pinyin: Hé Zéqīng

Paul He Zeqing (simplified Chinese: 何泽清; traditional Chinese: 何澤清; born March 1968) is a Sichuanese Roman Catholic Bishop of the Diocese of Wanxian, western China.

== Biography ==
He was born in 1968 in Wanzhou District of Chongqing. He was ordained a priest on November 30, 1993. He was ordained bishop of the Diocese of Wanxian in 2008. In 2016 he was elected vice president of the Bishops Conference of Catholic Church in China (BCCCC).

Catholic Church titles
Previous: Joseph Xu Zhixuan	Bishop of the Diocese of Wanxian; 2008	Incumbent
