= Diocese of Jiading =

Roman Catholic diocese in China

Diocese of Jiading Diocese of Leshan (according to Catholic Patriotic Association) Dioecesis Chiatimensis 天主教嘉定教區 天主教嘉定教区

Location
- Country: China
- Ecclesiastical province: Chongqing
- Metropolitan: Chongqing

Statistics
- Area: 27,000 km^{2} (10,000 sq mi)
- Population: Total: (as of 1950); 2,645,000

Information
- Denomination: Catholic Church
- Sui iuris church: Latin Church
- Rite: Roman Rite
- Established: July 10, 1929 (as apostolic prefecture)
- Cathedral: Sacred Heart of Jesus Cathedral, Leshan

Current leadership
- Pope: Leo XIV
- Bishop: Paul Lei Shiyin
- Metropolitan Archbishop: Sede vacante

Map
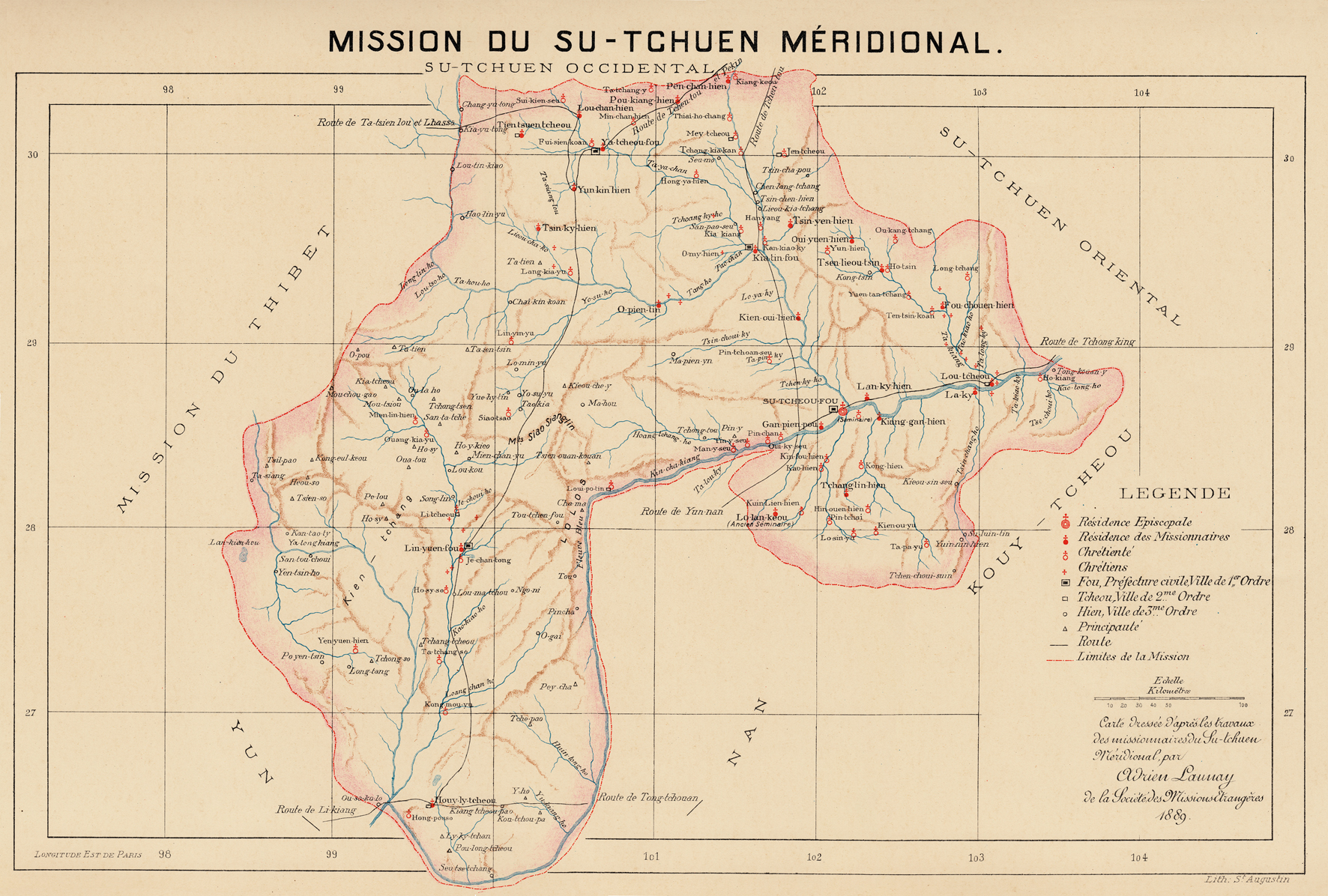
- Jiading (Kia-tin-fou) was part of the Southern Szechwan Mission. Map prepared by Adrien Launay, 1889.

The Diocese of Jiading (formerly spelled Kiating; Latin: Dioecesis Chiatimensis; simplified Chinese: 天主教嘉定教区; traditional Chinese: 天主教嘉定教區), also known as Diocese of Leshan (天主教乐山教区; 天主教樂山教區) according to the government controlled Catholic Patriotic Association, is a Latin Catholic diocese located in the city of Leshan (formerly Jiading Prefecture) in the ecclesiastical province of Chongqing in western China.

It was established on July 10, 1929 as the Apostolic Prefecture of Yachow for the Mission of Sichuan (Szechwan), its episcopal see was initially located in Yachow (present-day Ya'an).

== Territory ==
The Diocese of Jiading covers Leshan (Kia-tin-fou), Emeishan (O-my-hien), Meishan (Mey-tcheou), and Ya'an (Ya-tcheou-fou). It is bordered by the Diocese of Kangding to the west, Diocese of Ningyuan to the southwest, Diocese of Suifu to the south and east, and Diocese of Chengdu to the north.

== History ==
- July 10, 1929: Established as Apostolic Prefecture of Yachow (Ya-tcheou-fou) from the Apostolic Vicariate of Suifu (Su-tcheou-fou)
- March 3, 1933: Promoted as Apostolic Vicariate of Yachow
- February 9, 1938: Renamed as Apostolic Vicariate of Kiating (Kia-tin-fou)
- April 11, 1946: Promoted as Diocese of Kiating

== Bishops ==
Apostolic Prefect of Yachow

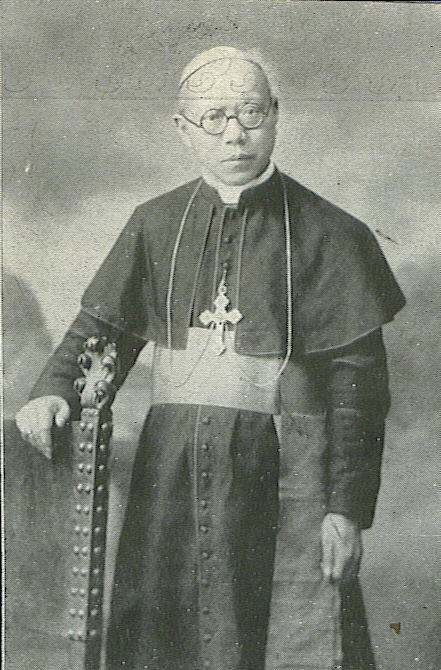
Matthias Li Jun-ho, first Apostolic Prefect of Yachow

- Matthias Li Jun-ho, October 22, 1929 – March 3, 1933

Apostolic Vicars of Yachow

- Matthias Li Jun-ho, March 3, 1933 – August 4, 1935
- Fabian Yu Yuwen, July 7, 1936 – February 9, 1938

Apostolic Vicar of Kiating

- Fabian Yu Yuwen, February 9, 1938 – March 6, 1943

Bishops of Kiating/Jiading

- Paul Deng Jizhou, June 9, 1949 – August 10, 1990
- Matthew Luo Duxi, September 21, 1993 – December 4, 2009
- Paul Lei Shiyin, June 29, 2011 –

== See also ==
- Anglican Diocese of Szechwan
