= Diocese of Suifu =

Roman Catholic diocese in China

Diocese of Suifu Dioecesis Siufuana 天主教叙府教區 天主教叙府教区
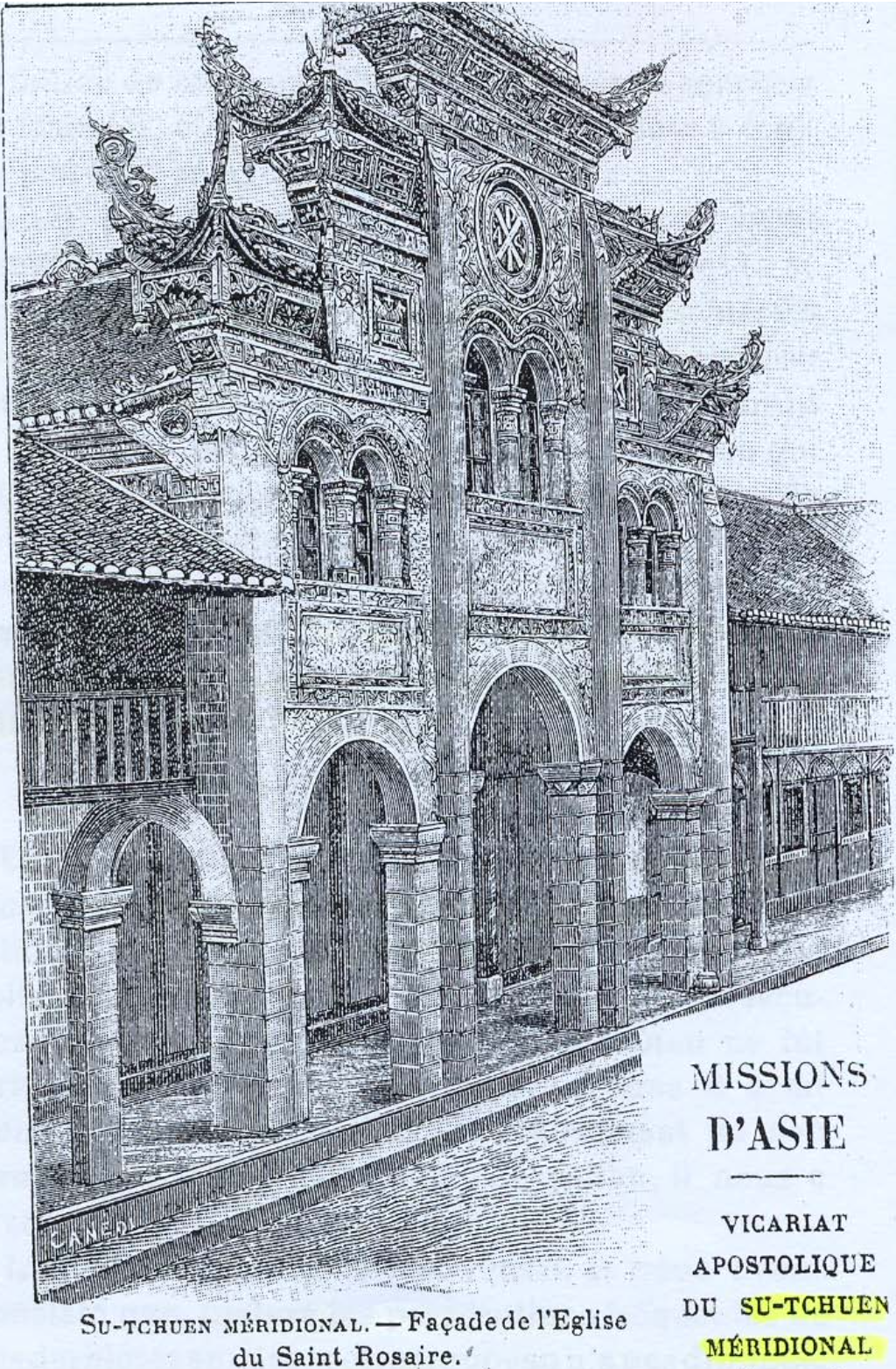
- Holy Rosary Church, Yibin, former seminary of the Southern Szechwan Mission

Location
- Country: China
- Ecclesiastical province: Chongqing
- Metropolitan: Chongqing

Information
- Denomination: Catholic Church
- Sui iuris church: Latin Church
- Rite: Roman Rite
- Established: January 24, 1860 (as apostolic vicariate)
- Cathedral: Blessed Sacrament Cathedral, Yibin

Current leadership
- Pope: Leo XIV
- Bishop: Peter Luo Xuegang
- Metropolitan Archbishop: Sede vacante

Map
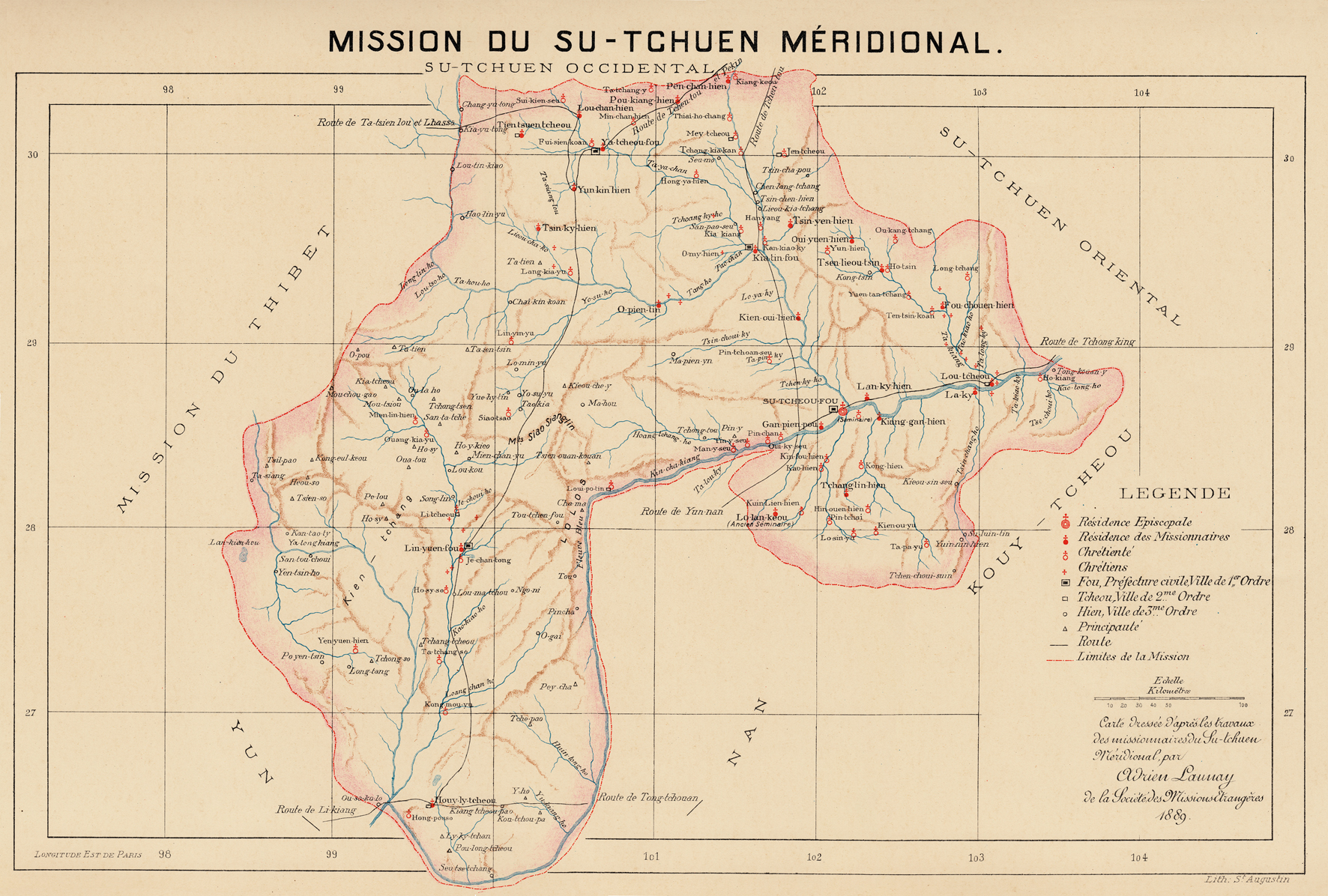
- Suifu (Su-tcheou-fou) was part of the Southern Szechwan Mission. Map prepared by Adrien Launay, 1889.

The Diocese of Suifu (Latin: Dioecesis Siufuana; Chinese: 天主教叙府教區), also known as Diocese of Yibin, is a Latin Catholic diocese located in the city of Yibin (formerly known as Suifu) in the ecclesiastical province of Chongqing in western China. It was established on January 24, 1860 as the Apostolic Vicariate of Southern Szechwan for the Mission of Sichuan (Szechwan). The area lies in the southern part of the mission territory, hence the designation of Southern Szechwan Mission.

== Territory ==
The Diocese of Suifu covers Luzhou (Lou-tcheou), Neijiang (Oui-yuen-hien), Yibin (Su-tcheou-fou) and Zigong (Tsen-lieou-tsin), totaling approximately 50,000 square kilometers. It is bordered by the Diocese of Jiading and Diocese of Ningyuan to the west, Archdiocese of Chongqing to the east, Diocese of Shunqing to the north, and Archdiocese of Kunming and Archdiocese of Guiyang to the south.

== History ==
- January 24, 1860: Established as Apostolic Vicariate of Southern Szechwan (Vicariatus Apostolicus Seciuensis Meridionalis) from the Apostolic Vicariate of Northwestern Szechwan
- December 3, 1924: Renamed as Apostolic Vicariate of Suifu (Vicariatus Apostolicus Siufuanus; Su-tcheou-fou)
- April 11, 1946: Promoted as Diocese of Suifu (Dioecesis Siufuana)

== Bishops ==
Vicars Apostolic of Southern Szechwan

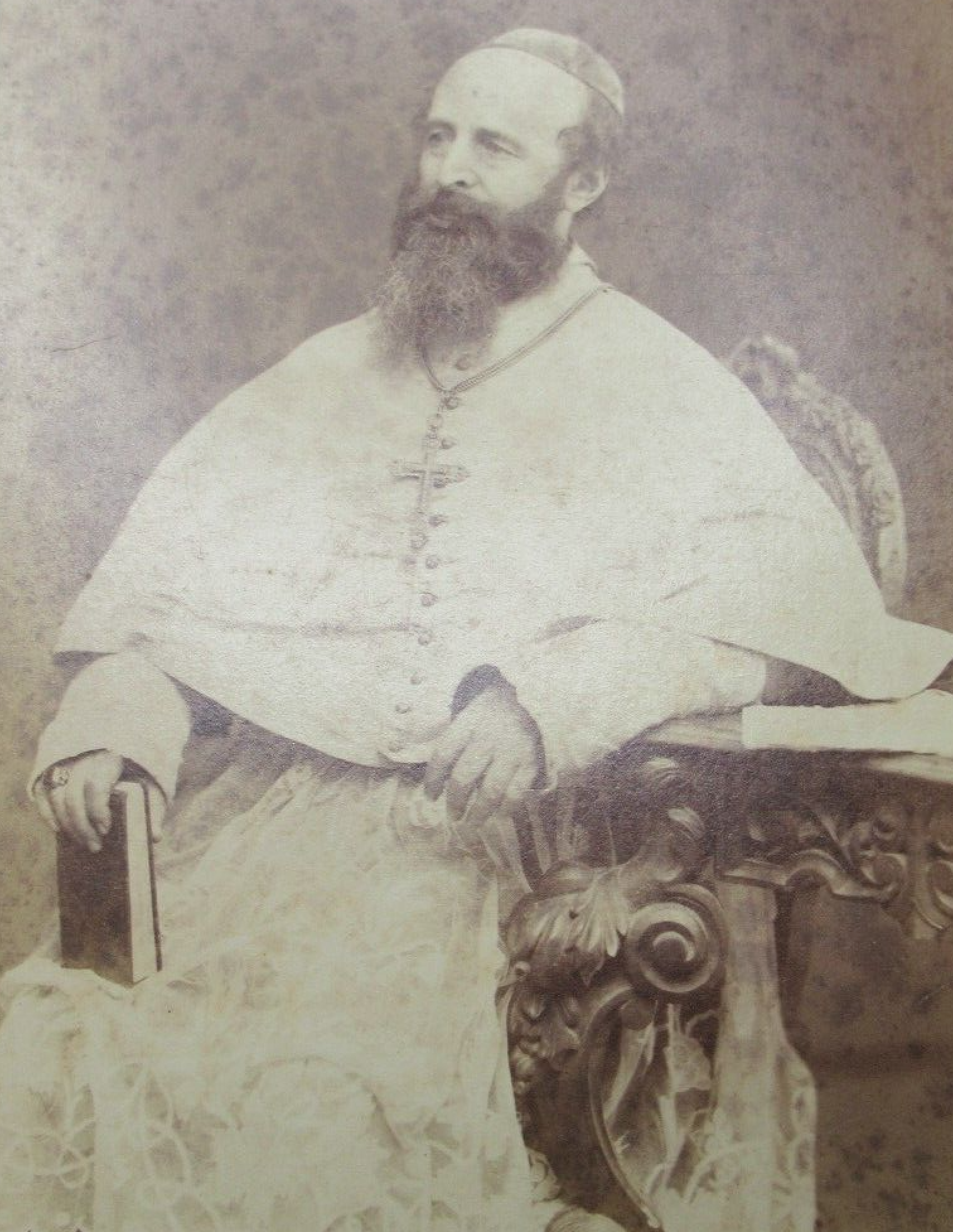
Pierre-Julien Pichon, first Vicar Apostolic of Southern Szechwan

- Pierre-Julien Pichon, M.E.P. (January 24, 1860 – March 12, 1871)
- Jules Lepley, M.E.P. (December 22, 1871 – March 6, 1886)
- Marc Chatagnon, M.E.P. (January 25, 1887 – November 26, 1920)

Vicars Apostolic of Suifu

- Jean-Pierre-Marie Fayolle, M.E.P. (November 26, 1920 – October 19, 1931)
- Louis-Nestor Renault, M.E.P. (October 19, 1931 – October 28, 1943)
- René-Désiré-Romain Boisguérin, M.E.P. (January 10, 1946 – April 11, 1946)

Bishops of Suifu

- René-Désiré-Romain Boisguérin, M.E.P. (April 11, 1946 – February 13, 1983)
- John Chen Shi-zhong (1985 – 2012)
- Peter Luo Xuegang (December 16, 2012 – present)

== See also ==
- Anglican Diocese of Szechwan
