= Paul Lei Shiyin =

- Bishop of Jiading (Leshan)
- Native name: 雷世银
- Church: Catholic Church
- Diocese: Diocese of Jiading (Leshan)
- Installed: 29 June 2011
- Predecessor: Matthew Luo Duxi

Orders
- Ordination: 30 November 1991
- Consecration: 29 June 2011 by John Fang Xingyao

Personal details
- Born: 13 October 1963 (age 62)
- Coat of arms

Paul Lei Shiyin (simplified Chinese: 雷世银; traditional Chinese: 雷世銀; born 13 October 1963) is the current Sichuanese Roman Catholic bishop of the Diocese of Jiading (Leshan).

== Biography ==
Ordained priest on 30 November 1991, Lei quickly became one of the leading members of the Catholic Church in Sichuan, which led him to hold several posts: he was chosen as one of the treasurers of the Catholic Church in Sichuan, then becomes one of the vice presidents of the Catholic Patriotic Association. His conciliatory attitude toward the Chinese Communist Party (he is also a member of the Chinese People's Political Consultative Conference) and the influence of his brother in economic circles lead the Communist Party to support him when it comes in 2010 to replace Bishop Matthew Luo Duxi, who died at the age of 90 as bishop of Leshan. He was thus elected bishop by an ecclesiastical college by 27 votes out of 31.

The Holy See refused to validate his election and told the Chinese authorities that it was impossible to recognize him as a bishop. Officials from the state-sanctioned Catholic Patriotic Association, however, said they acknowledged the election of Lei. He was therefore consecrated bishop on 29 June 2011, in the church of Emeishan in the presence of several government officials, and with the participation of several Catholic bishops in communion with the pope, which embarrassed the Vatican.

On 4 July the Vatican spokesman announced that the episcopal consecration of Lei was "illegitimate" and contrary to canon law, which in fact provoked the excommunication latae sententiae of Lei. Speaking about this affair, Benedict XVI said he was "deeply saddened by this unilateral act that sows divisions".

On 22 September 2018, Pope Francis lifted the excommunication of Paul Lei Shiyin and other bishops previously appointed by the Chinese government without a pontifical mandate.
