= John Chen Shi-zhong =

- Bishop of Suifu (Yibin)
- Native name: 陳適中
- Church: Catholic Church
- Diocese: Diocese of Suifu (Yibin)
- In office: 14 June 1985 – 16 December 2012
- Predecessor: Wang Ju-guang
- Successor: Peter Luo Xuegang

Orders
- Ordination: February 1943
- Consecration: 14 June 1985 by Matthias Duan Yinming

Personal details
- Born: 26 December 1917 I-pin, Szechwan, Republic of China
- Died: 16 December 2012 (aged 94) Yibin, Sichuan, China

John Chen Shi-zhong (Chinese: 陳適中; pinyin: Chén Shìzhōng; Wade–Giles: Chʻen Shih-chung; 26 December 1917 – 16 December 2012 in Yibin, Sichuan, China) was the Roman Catholic bishop of the Diocese of Suifu (Yibin), western China.

Born in 1917 to a Chinese Catholic family and raised in Yibin, Bishop Chen was ordained to the priesthood in 1947.

Chen was imprisoned twice, first time during the 1950s and again during the Cultural Revolution in the 1960s. He was rehabilitated in 1981 and was named bishop in 1985. He was recognized by the Holy See and the People's Republic of China as bishop. In 1988 to 1989 he was briefly rector of the regional seminary in Szechwan, before returning to his diocese in Yibin, due to ill health. In 2011, Peter Luo Xuegang was consecrated as coadjutor bishop of Yibin (Suifu) to assist Shizhong.

== See also ==
- Catholic Church in Sichuan
