= Matthias Duan Yinming =

- Bishop of the Diocese of Wanxian
- Native name: 段荫明
- Province: Sichuan
- Installed: 1949
- Term ended: 2001
- Predecessor: Francis Xavier Wang Zepu
- Successor: Joseph Xu Zhixuan

Orders
- Ordination: 1953

Personal details
- Born: February 22, 1908 Dachuan District, Dazhou, Sichuan, Qing dynasty
- Died: January 10, 2001 (aged 92) Beijing, China
- Denomination: Roman Catholic
- Education: Pontifical Urban University

Chinese name
- Traditional Chinese: 段蔭明
- Simplified Chinese: 段荫明
Transcriptions
Standard Mandarin
- Hanyu Pinyin: Duàn Yīnmíng

Matthias Duan Yinming (simplified Chinese: 段荫明; traditional Chinese: 段蔭明; 22 February 1908 - 10 January 2001) was a Sichuanese Roman Catholic Bishop of the Diocese of Wanxian, western China.

== Biography ==
Duan was born in Dachuan District, Dazhou, Sichuan, on February 22, 1908, to a Catholic family, during the late Qing dynasty. He went to study at Pontifical Urban University in Rome in 1935. He was ordained a priest in 1938.

In 1944, he was appointed president of the Shiguang Catholic Church. On June 9, 1949, Pope Pius XII appointed Duan as bishop of the Diocese of Wanxian. He was ordained bishop on October 18 of that same year.

After the establishment of the Communist State, he successively served as director of the Sichuan Catholic Partnership, member of the China Catholic Partnership, vice-chairman of Sichuan Catholic Partnership.

In 1998, Pope John Paul II invited Duan to attend the special session of bishops in Asia. He could not travel without a passport.

He died on January 10, 2001.

Catholic Church titles
Previous: Francis Xavier Wang Zepu	Bishop of the Diocese of Wanxian; 1949-2001	Next: Joseph Xu Zhixuan
