= Dachuan, Dazhou =

Dachuan 达川区
- District
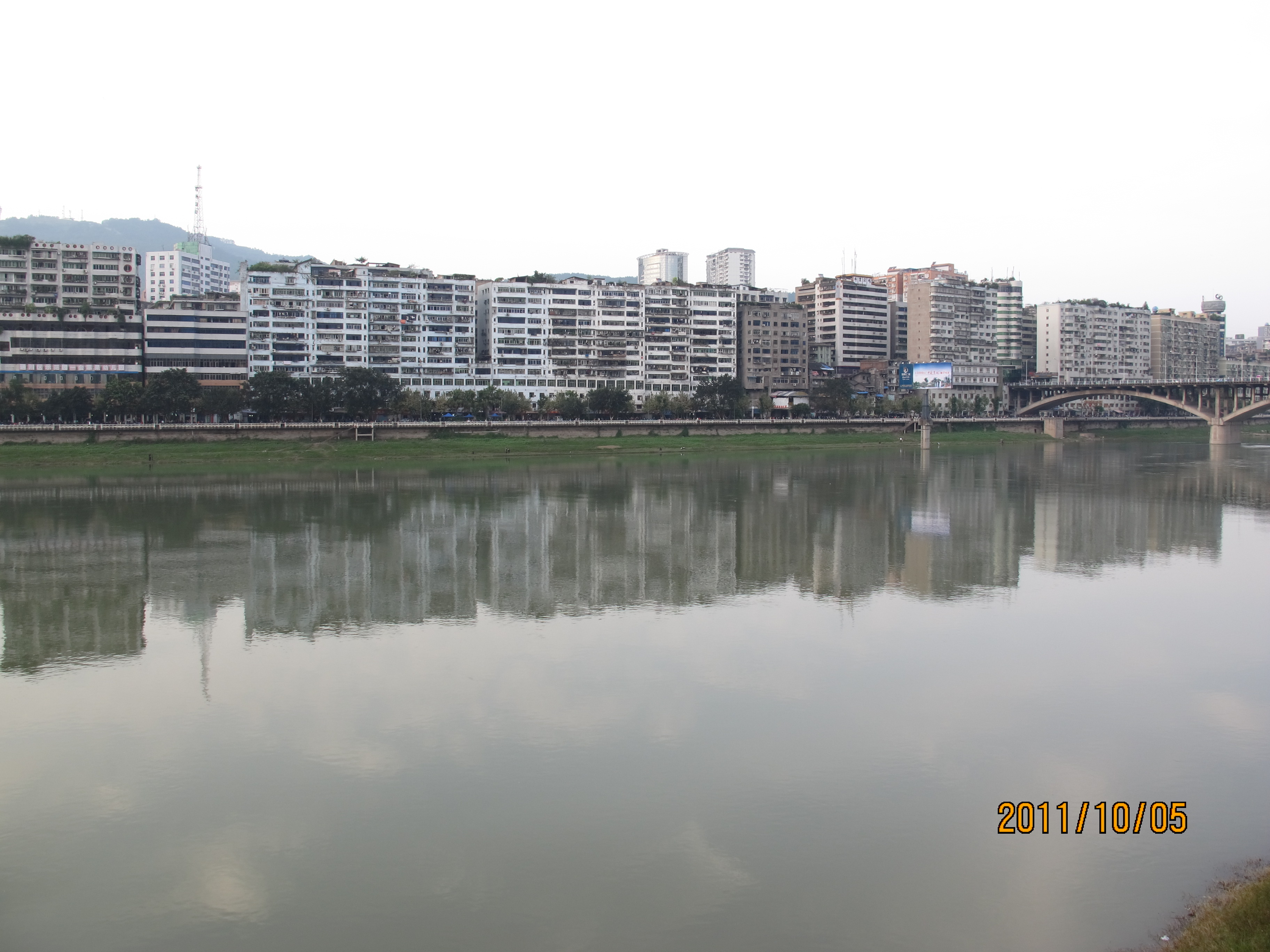

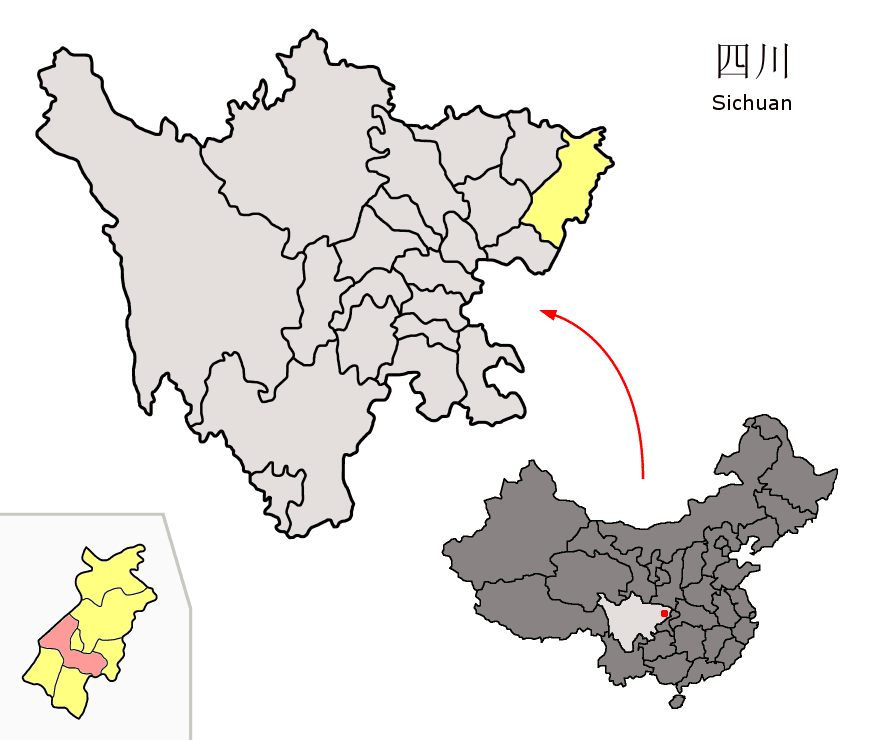
- Location of Dachuan District (red) in Dazhou (yellow) and Sichuan

- Location of the county seat in Sichuan
- Coordinates: 31°12′N 107°31′E
- Country: China
- Province: Sichuan
- Prefecture-level city: Dazhou
- County seat: Sanliping Subdistrict

Area
  - Total: 2,688 km^{2} (1,038 sq mi)
- Elevation: 312 m (1,024 ft)

Population (2020 census)
  - Total: 945,191
  - Density: 351.6/km^{2} (910.7/sq mi)
- Time zone: UTC+8 (China Standard)
- Postal code: 635000
- Area code: 0818
- Website: www.dachuan.gov.cn

Dachuan District (simplified Chinese: 达川区; traditional Chinese: 達川區; pinyin: Dáchuān Qū) is a district of Dazhou in northeastern Sichuan province. In 2020, it had a population of 945,191 inhabitants residing in an area of 2,688 square kilometres (1,038 sq mi). It was called Da County (达县; 達縣; Dá Xiàn) or Daxian, until July 2013, when it renamed to Dachuan District.

== Administrative divisions ==
Dachuan District administers 6 subdistricts, 22 towns and 5 townships.

Subdistricts

- Sanliping (三里坪街道)
- Cuiping (翠屏街道)
- Shiban (石板街道)
- Binlang (斌郎街道)
- Mingyuejiang (明月江街道)
- Yanliu (杨柳街道)

Towns

- Tingzi (亭子镇)
- Fushan (福善镇)
- Maliu (麻柳镇)
- Dashu (大树镇)
- Nanqiu (南岳镇
- Wanjia (万家镇)
- Jingshi (景市镇)
- Baijie (百节镇)
- Zhaojia (赵家镇)
- Heshi (河市镇)
- Jinya (金垭镇)
- Dushi (渡市镇)
- Guancun (管村镇)
- Shiti (石梯镇)
- Shiqiao (石桥镇)
- Baozi (堡子镇)
- Pingtan (平滩镇)
- Shuangmiao (双庙镇)
- Zhaogu (赵固镇)
- Qiaowan (桥湾镇)
- Dayan (大堰镇)
- Guanzi (罐子镇)

Townships

- Anren (安仁乡)
- Yaotang (幺塘乡)
- Longhui (龙会乡)
- Hurang (虎让乡)
- Micheng (米城乡)

== Transport ==
- Dazhou Jinya Airport
