= Archdiocese of Chongqing =

Roman Catholic archdiocese in China

Coordinates: 29.5604°N 106.5660°E

Archdiocese of Chongqing Archidioecesis Ciomchimensis 天主教重慶總教區 天主教重庆总教区
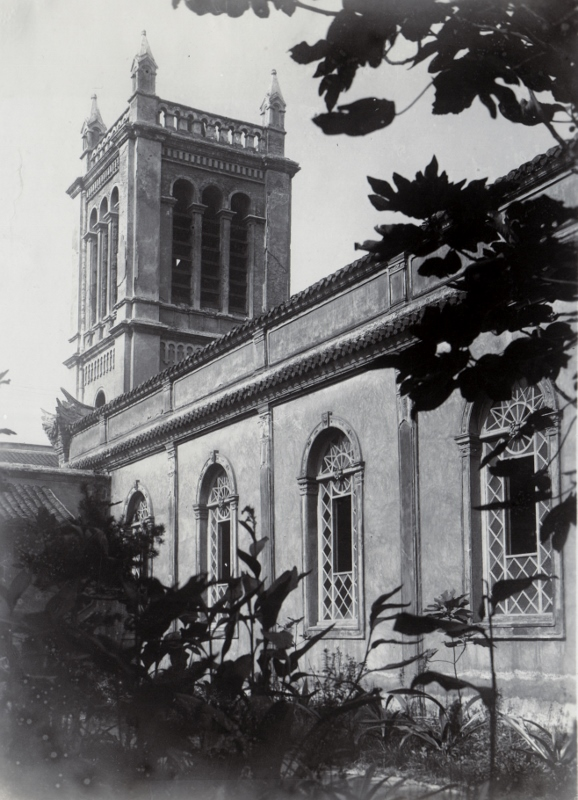
- St. Joseph's Cathedral, Chongqing

Location
- Country: China
- Ecclesiastical province: Chongqing

Statistics
- Area: 350,000 km^{2} (140,000 sq mi)
- Population: Total; Catholics: (as of 1950); 11,500,000; 37,608 (0.3%)

Information
- Denomination: Catholic Church
- Sui iuris church: Latin Church
- Rite: Roman Rite
- Established: 2 April 1856 (as apostolic vicariate)
- Cathedral: St. Joseph's Cathedral, Chongqing

Current leadership
- Pope: Leo XIV
- Metropolitan Archbishop: Andrew Ding Yang

Map
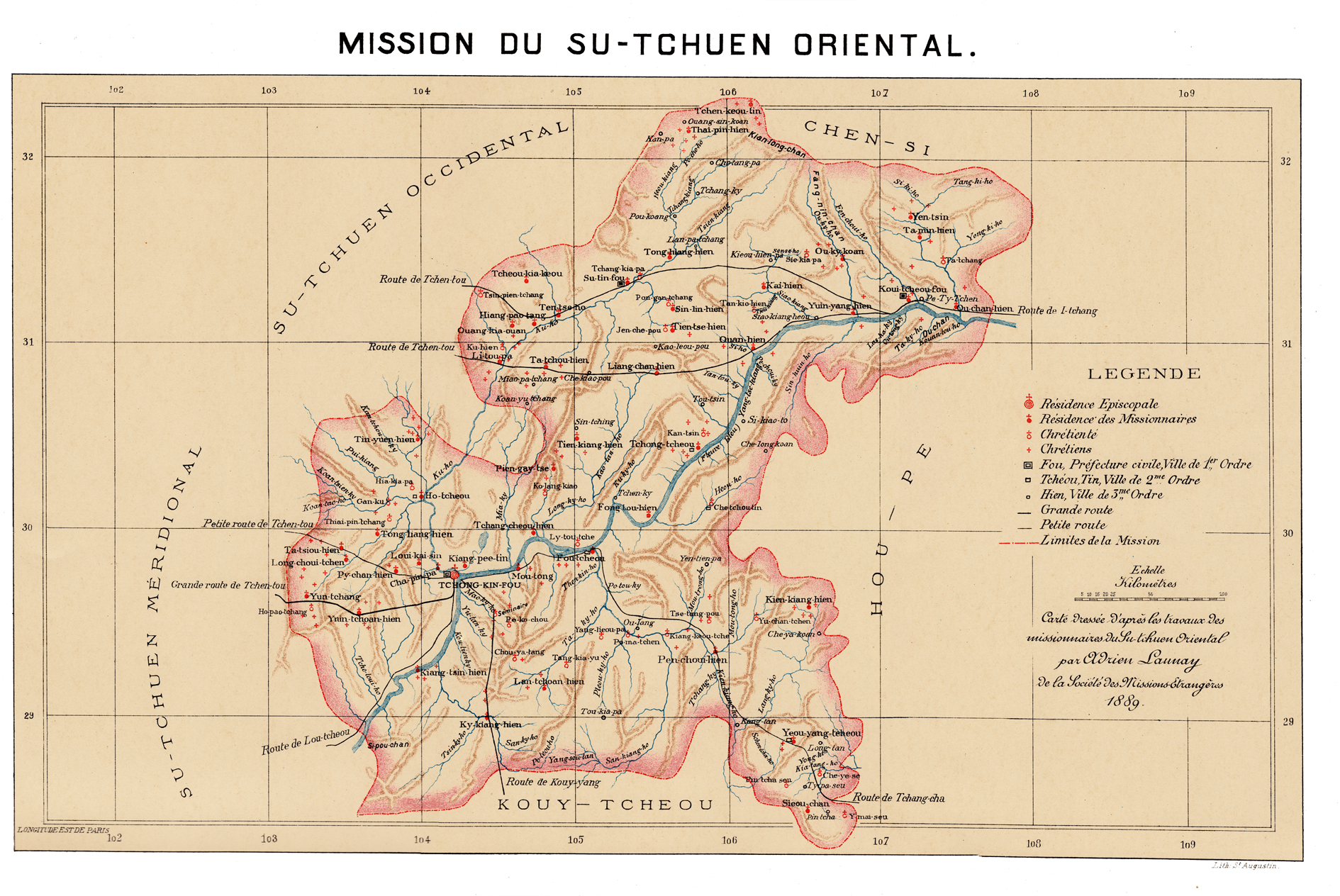
- Chongqing (Tchong-kin-fou) was part of the Eastern Szechwan Mission. Map prepared by Adrien Launay, 1889.

The Metropolitan Archdiocese of Chongqing (formerly spelt Chungking) (Latin: Archidioecesis Ciomchimensis; Chinese: 天主教重慶總教區) is a Latin Church Metropolitan archdiocese of the Catholic Church located in southwestern China, yet still depends on the missionary Roman Congregation for the Evangelization of Peoples. The Archbishop of Chongqing is the primate of the Catholic Church in Sichuan (Szechwan).

Established on 2 April 1856 as the Apostolic Vicariate of Southeastern Szechwan, its archiepiscopal see is the Cathedral of St. Joseph, located in the provincial-level city of Chongqing, which lies in the eastern part of the mission territory, hence the designation of Eastern Szechwan Mission. The archdiocese has been vacant without an apostolic administrator since 2001.

== Statistics and extent ==
The archdiocese covers the southern part of Chongqing (Tchong-kin-fou), while the north, including 1 district and 8 counties, is under the jurisdiction of the Bishop of Wanxian (Ouan-hien). It is bordered by the Diocese of Suifu (its suffragan) to the west, Diocese of Shunqing (its suffragan) to the northwest, Diocese of Wanxian (its suffragan) to the northeast, Diocese of Shinan to the east, Diocese of Yuanling to the southeast, Apostolic Prefecture of Shiqian and Metropolitan Archdiocese of Guiyang to the south.

In 1950, it pastorally served 37,608 Catholics (0.3%) on 135,187 square miles in 42 parishes with 85 diocesan priests and 120 religious (only 6 males).

== Ecclesiastical province ==
Its suffragan sees are:

- Diocese of Chengdu
- Diocese of Jiading
- Diocese of Kangding
- Diocese of Ningyuan
- Diocese of Shunqing
- Diocese of Suifu
- Diocese of Wanxian, its daughter

== History ==
- Established on 2 April 1856 as Apostolic Vicariate of Southeastern Szechwan (Vicariatus Apostolicus Seciuensis Meridio-Orientalis), renamed on 24 January 1860 as Apostolic Vicariate of Eastern Szechwan (Vicariatus Apostolicus Seciuensis Orientalis), on territory split off from the Apostolic Vicariate of Szechwan (Sichuan), separating it from North-western Szechwan and its first name was South-eastern Szechwan. There were nine European and ten native priests, the mission being confided to Paris Foreign Missions Society. Eugène-Jean-Claude-Joseph Desflèches (1844–87), Titular Bishop of Sinita, was elected as the first apostolic vicar. Missionaries and Christians were subject to imperial persecutions, but after the Sino-French War of 1860, they obtained entire freedom to preach. In 1860 the mission was divided into two apostolic vicariates: Eastern and Southern Szechwan. The missionaries obtained from Chinese officials a piece of ground in the city of Chongqing (Chungking), as compensation for the losses undergone by the mission. New persecutions broke out: at You-yang, Jean-Honoré Eyraud was put in jail and François Mabileau and Jean-François Rigaud were murdered; at Kien-Kiang, Jean Hue and Michel Tay were killed in 1873; on 8 March 1876, the settlements of the Christians were pillaged at Kiang-pe. Eugène-Paul Coupat, elected coadjutor in 1882, in 1888 succeeded Bishop Desflèches, who was 'promoted' Titular Archbishop of Claudiopolis in Honoriade. In 1886 the buildings of the mission at Chongqing were pillaged and destroyed, the bishop and missionaries had to retire into the Chinese tribunal. In 1891, Célestin Chouvellon, titular Bishop of Dausara, succeeded Bishop Coupat. In 1898, François Fleury was captured by Yu Man-tse and held prisoner for months.
- Renamed on 3 December 1924 after its see as Apostolic Vicariate of Chungking (Vicariatus Apostolicus Ciomchimensis; in French: Tchong-kin-fou).
- Lost territory on 2 August 1929 to establish the then Apostolic Vicariate of Wanhsien (Ouan-hien), now its suffragan
- Promoted on 11 April 1946 as Metropolitan Archdiocese of Chungking (Archidioecesis Ciomchimensis).

== Episcopal ordinaries ==
All Roman Rite, so far members of a Latin missionary congregation.

Apostolic Vicar of Southeastern Szechwan

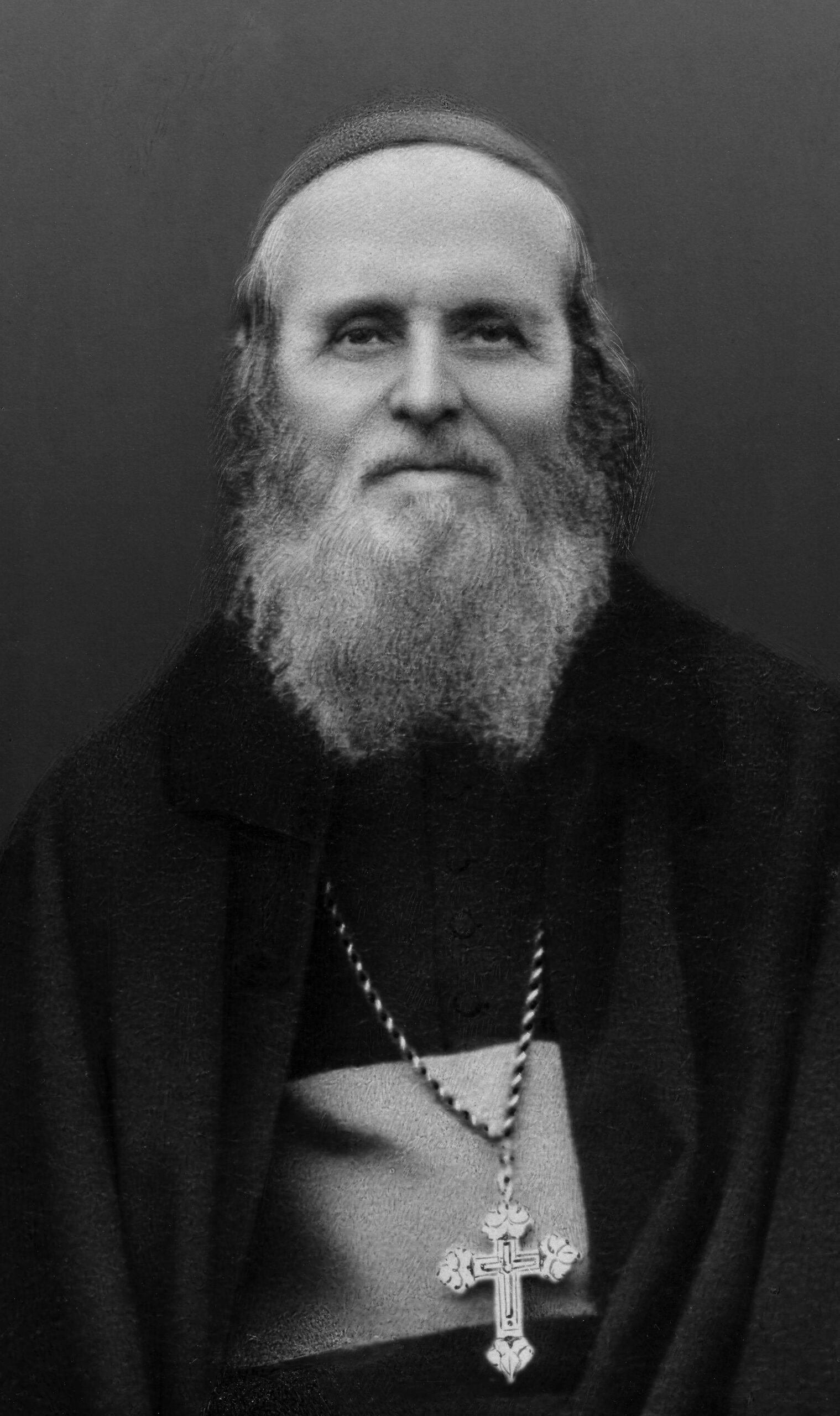
Joseph Desflèches, first Apostolic Vicar of Southeastern Szechwan.

- Eugène-Jean-Claude-Joseph Desflèches (Paris Foreign Missions Society, abbreviated M.E.P.) (born in France) (2 April 1856 – 24 January 1860); previously Titular Bishop of Sinita (1842.05.29 – 1883.02.20) as Coadjutor Apostolic Vicar of Szechwan (1844 – 1856.04.02); emeritate as Titular Archbishop of Claudiopolis in Honoriade (1883.02.20 – death 1887.11.07).

Apostolic Vicars of Eastern Szechwan

- Eugène-Jean-Claude-Joseph Desflèches, M.E.P. (born in France) (see above; 24 January 1860 – retired 20 February 1883)
- Eugène-Paul Coupat, M.E.P. (born in France) (20 February 1883 – death 26 January 1890), succeeding as former Coadjutor Vicar Apostolic of Eastern Szechwan (1882.08.28 – 1883.02.20) and Titular Bishop of Thagaste (1882.08.28 – 1890.01.26)
- Laurent Blettery, M.E.P. (born in France) (2 September 1890 – 17 August 1891 not possessed), Titular Bishop of Zela (1890.09.02 – 1891.08.17 not possessed); died 1898
- Célestin-Félix-Joseph Chouvellon, M.E.P. (born France) (25 September 1891 – death 11 May 1924), Titular Bishop of Dausara (1891.09.25 – 1924.05.11)

Apostolic Vicar of Chungking

- Louis-Gabriel-Xavier Jantzen, M.E.P. (last incumbent born in France) (16 February 1925 – 11 April 1946 see below), Titular Bishop of Tremithus (1926.02.16 – 1946.04.11)

Metropolitan Archbishop of Chungking

- Louis-Gabriel-Xavier Jantzen, M.E.P. (see above 11 April 1946 – retired 24 October 1950), emeritate as Titular Archbishop of Phasis (1950.10.24 – death 1953.08.28)

Metropolitan Archbishops of Chongqing

- uncanonical, i.e. without papal mandate: Shi Mingliang (1963 – ?), died 1978
- without papal mandate: Simon Liu Zongyu (1981 – 1992.09.30), died 1992
- Peter Luo Beizhan (1993 – death 2001.03.26)
- Andrew Ding Yang (Since 28 July 2026)

== See also ==
- Anglican Diocese of Szechwan
- List of Catholic dioceses in China

== Sources and external links ==
- "Metropolitan Archdiocese of Chongqing — data for all sections except statistics". gcatholic.org.
- "Archdiocese of Chongqing [Chungking] — statistics". catholic-hierarchy.org.

Attribution
