= List of Catholic dioceses =

As of June 21, 2024, the Catholic Church comprises 3,172 ecclesiastical jurisdictions worldwide, including over 652 archdioceses and 2,250 dioceses. It also includes various other jurisdictions such as apostolic vicariates, apostolic exarchates, apostolic administrations, apostolic prefectures, military ordinariates, personal ordinariates, personal prelatures, territorial prelatures, territorial abbacies, and missions sui juris.

In addition, there are 2,100 titular sees, encompassing bishoprics, archbishoprics, and metropolitanates.

This structural list outlines how each diocese is organized within its ecclesiastical province, under the framework of episcopal conferences, grouped by continent or region.

== Map ==
This map visualizes the provinces of the Catholic Church, as well as archdioceses (and other top-level entities) where provinces are not established, as of 2025

== Types of Catholic dioceses ==
This refers to Catholic dioceses in the world, of all Latin or Eastern churches, as of 5 October 2021.

| Type | Total | Filled | Vacant |
|---|---|---|---|
| Holy See: St. Peter's Chair in Rome (papacy) | 1 | 1 | 0 |
| Ancient Patriarchal Sees of the East (Patriarchates) | 9 | 9 | 0 |
| Major Archiepiscopal Sees (Major Archeparchies) | 4 | 4 | 0 |
| Latin Patriarchal Sees | 3 | 3 | 0 |
| Titular Patriarchal Sees | 4 | 3 | 1 |
| Metropolitan Sees (Archdioceses & Eastern Archeparchies) | 566 | 544 | 22 |
| Other Archiepiscopal Sees (Latin Archdioceses & Eastern Archeparchies) | 76 | 70 | 6 |
| Episcopal Sees (Latin Dioceses & Eastern Eparchies) | 2,244 | 2,029 | 215 |
| Titular Metropolitan Sees including Archeparchies | 92 | 14 | 78 |
| Titular Archiepiscopal Sees including Archeparchies | 91 | 6 | 85 |
| Titular Episcopal Sees including Eparchies | 1,913 | 1,059 | 854 |
| Territorial Prelatures | 40 | 36 | 4 |
| Territorial Abbacies (often Exempt) | 11 | 9 | 2 |
| Military Ordinariates (all Exempt) | 36 | 24 | 12 |
| Personal Prelature (exempt) | 1 | 1 | 0 |
| Apostolic Vicariates (generally Exempt, mission) | 84 | 75 | 9 |
| Apostolic Prefectures (generally Exempt, mission) | 39 | 14 | 25 |
| Apostolic Administrations | 8 | 7 | 1 |
| Independent Missions (Missions sui iuris) | 8 | 8 | 0 |

Additional types, exclusively for the Eastern Churches, Ordinariate Use and Extraordinary Form

| Type | Total | Filled | Vacant |
|---|---|---|---|
| Metropolitan Sees (Eastern Archeparchies, Sui Juris) | 5 | 5 | 0 |
| Apostolic Exarchates (Eastern mission, Exempt) | 13 | 11 | 2 |
| Ordinariates for the Faithful of the Eastern Churches (Eastern, Exempt) | 9 | 6 | 3 |
| Personal Ordinariates (Western Anglican Patrimony, Anglican/Ordinariate Use, Exempt) | 3 | 3 | 0 |
| Patriarchal Exarchates (Eastern missions) | 10 | 8 | 2 |
| Archiepiscopal Exarchates (Eastern) | 5 | 4 | 1 |
| Territories Dependent on the Patriarch (Eastern) | 5 | 4 | 1 |
| Personal Apostolic Administration (unique case, Exempt) | 1 | 1 | 0 |

== Exempt Catholic Dioceses (directly subject to the Holy See) ==
These (arch)dioceses are exempt from belonging to any ecclesiastical province, hence only the Vatican can exert the authority and coordinating functions normally falling to the Metropolitan Archbishop. They are grouped here geographically. Nevertheless, most belong to an episcopal conference, in which case the more relevant mention is in its geographical region, as exempt dioceses as such do not have specific ties with each other.

- Military ordinariates are in pastoral charge of the troops of a state, but may be vested in a Metropolitan Archbishop, typically in the national capital.
- Also generally exempt are the apostolic prefectures and apostolic vicariates, which tend to be temporary missionary dioceses, expected to become part of an ecclesiastical province when promoted to regular (arch- or suffragan) bishopric.
- The Personal Ordinariates for former Anglicans (who left the Anglican Communion for communion with the Holy See) are allowed to use the Ordinariate Use, which is counted as a variant usage of the Roman Rite (unlike the Eastern churches' five distinct rites).
- Eastern Ordinariates are in pastoral charge of all Eastern Churches, of only those of Byzantine Rite or even just of the Armenian Rite, in one or more states of various Catholic churches without any proper diocese there, but are usually vested in a Latin Catholic Metropolitan Archbishop, often in the capital.
- Disregarded are many episcopal or archiepiscopal prelates in the Roman Curia, as their dicasteries don't constitute dioceses, although many posts there require by law or custom a bishop or an archbishop (usually titular), just as the Vatican's diplomatic posts in nearly every national capital.

=== Universal or transcontinental exempt dioceses (not counting minor dependencies) ===
- The personal prelature (a unique status) of Opus Dei, with a cathedral see (Santa Maria della Pace ai Parioli) in Rome, ranking as bishopric.
- The transcontinental Apostolic Administration of the Caucasus covering both Georgia (including breakaway self-declared states Abkhazia and South Ossetia) and Armenia, with cathedral see at Tbilisi (Georgia).
- The Personal Ordinariate of Our Lady of the Southern Cross (for former Anglicans in Australia and Japan).

=== European exempt dioceses ===
- in Italy:
  - some (arch)bishoprics under the papal Metropolitan see at Rome, including
  - Military Ordinariate of Italy, cumulated with varying sees
  - Archdiocese of Lucca
  - Territorial Abbey of Montecassino, whose cathedral see is a minor basilica
  - Territorial Abbacy of Monte Oliveto Maggiore, with cathedral see in Siena, seat of the abbot-general of the Olivetans (a Benedictine congregation)
  - formerly the Territorial Abbey of San Paolo fuori le Mura (since 2005, just an abbey, territory incorporated into the diocese of Rome)
  - Territorial Abbacy of Subiaco, whose cathedral see and co-cathedral are minor basilicas
  - Italo-Albanese Territorial Abbacy of Santa Maria di Grottaferrata, only non-Latin Church territorial abbey: Italo-Albanese Catholic rite
  - Italo-Albanese Diocese of Piana degli Albanesi, with cathedral see at Palermo, on Sicily
  - Italo-Albanese Diocese of Lungro, with cathedral see at Lungro, near Cosenza in Calabria
- in Austria:
  - Ordinariate for Byzantine-rite Catholics in Austria, vested in the Metropolitan Archbishop of capital Vienna
  - Military Ordinariate of Austria, not vested in any see
- in Belgium: Military Ordinariate of Belgium, vested in the primatial Metropolitan Archbishop of Mechelen-Brussels
- in Bosnia and Herzegovina: Military Ordinariate of Bosnia and Herzegovina, not vested in any see
- in Bulgaria:
  - Diocese of Nicopoli
  - Diocese of Sofia and Plovdiv
  - Eparchy of Saint John XXIII of Sofia
- in Croatia:
  - Archdiocese of Zadar
  - Military Ordinariate of Croatia, not vested in any see
- in the Czech Republic:
  - Ruthenian Apostolic Exarchate of Czech Republic
- in and for all Denmark: Diocese of Copenhagen, including its overseas territories Greenland and the Faroe Islands
- in and for all Estonia: Roman Catholic Diocese of Tallinn (at Tallinn),
- Finland, including the autonomous region of Åland: Diocese of Helsinki
- in France:
  - Military Ordinariate of France
  - Archdiocese of Strasbourg
  - Diocese of Metz
  - Ordinariate for Eastern Catholics in France, vested in the Metropolitan Archbishop of capital Paris, for remaining Eastern Churches
- in Germany
  - Military Ordinariate of Germany, cumulated with varying sees
  - Apostolic Exarchate in Germany and Scandinavia for the Ukrainians, with cathedral see in Munich (Bavaria); also for Nordic countries: Denmark, Finland, Norway and Sweden
- in and for all Gibraltar: Diocese of Gibraltar
- in Greece:
  - Archdiocese of Athens
  - Archdiocese of Rhodos
  - Archdiocese of Corfu, Zakynthos and Cephalonia, on the Ionian Islands
  - Apostolic Vicariate of Thessaloniki
  - Ordinariate for Armenian Catholics in Greece
  - Greek Catholic Apostolic Exarchate of Greece, with cathedral see in Athens, for the Greek Catholic particular Eastern church
- in Hungary:
  - Military Ordinariate of Hungary, not vested in any see
  - Territorial Abbacy of Pannonhalma, whose abbatial cathedral see is a minor basilica
- in and for all Iceland: Diocese of Reykjavík
- in Kosovo:
  - Diocese of Prizren-Priština, for all Kosovo
  - cfr. Serbia for the Catholics of Byzantine Rite
- in and for all the principality of Liechtenstein: Archdiocese of Vaduz
- in Lithuania: Military Ordinariate of Lithuania
- in and for all the Grand duchy of Luxemburg: Archdiocese of Luxembourg
- in and for all Moldova (Moldavia): Diocese of Chişinău
- in and for all the principality of Monaco: Archdiocese of Monaco
- in Montenegro: Archdiocese of Bar
- in the Netherlands: Military Ordinariate of the Netherlands, cumulated with varying sees
- in North Macedonia: Macedonian Catholic Eparchy of the Assumption of the Blessed Virgin Mary in Strumica-Skopje
- in Norway:
  - Diocese of Oslo for most of Norway
  - Territorial Prelature of Trondheim
  - Territorial Prelature of Tromsø
- in Poland:
  - Ordinariate for Eastern Catholics in Poland, for all Eastern Churches, vested in the Metropolitan Archbishop of capital Warszaw
  - Military Ordinariate of Poland
- in Portugal: Military Ordinariate of Portugal, not vested in any see
- in Romania:
  - Archdiocese of Alba Iulia
  - Ordinariate for Armenian Catholics in Romania
- in Russia (cfr. infra Eastern Europe & Asia):
  - Russian Catholic Apostolic Exarchate of Russia, vacant since 1951
- in Sweden: Diocese of Stockholm
- in Serbia: Byzantine Catholic Eparchy of Saint Nicholas of Ruski Krstur, for Catholics of Byzantine Rite in Serbia
- Military Ordinariate of Slovakia, not vested in any see
- Military Ordinariate of Spain, ranking as archbishop, cumulated with varying sees
- in Switzerland, all diocesan sees (joined in a national episcopal conference, without province):
  - Diocese of Basel
  - Diocese of Chur
  - Diocese of Lausanne, Geneva and Fribourg
  - Diocese of Lugano
  - Diocese of Sankt Gallen
  - Diocese of Sion (Sitten)
  - Territorial Abbacy of Maria Einsiedeln
  - Territorial Abbacy of Saint-Maurice d’Agaune
- in the UK:
  - Military Ordinariate of Great-Britain for UK-based troops, being joint for both UK provinces England & Wales and Scotland
  - Personal Ordinariate of Our Lady of Walsingham (for former Anglicans in England and Wales and in Scotland)
  - Syro-Malabar Catholic Eparchy of Great Britain (England, Scotland & Wales)
- Ordinariate for Armenian Catholics in Eastern Europe, actually only for Armenia, Georgia (country), Russia and Ukraine
- in Ukraine: Mukachevo (Munkách) Ruthenian Greek-Catholic Eparchy

=== Asian exempt dioceses ===
- Latin Patriarchate of Jerusalem, for all of the Holy Land (Palestine & Israel), Jordan and Cyprus
- Apostolic Vicariate of Aleppo, for all of Syria
- Apostolic Vicariate of Beirut, for all of Lebanon
- Apostolic Vicariate of Northern Arabia, in Kuwait City, for all of Kuwait, Bahrain, Saudi Arabia and Qatar
- Apostolic Vicariate of Southern Arabia, in Abu Dhabi (UAE), for all of Oman, United Arab Emirates and Yemen
- Roman Catholic Archdiocese of Baghdad, covering Iraq
- Apostolic Vicariate of Brunei Darussalam, covering Brunei
- all dioceses in Cambodia (joined in a common episcopal conference with Laos):
  - Apostolic Vicariate of Phnom Penh
  - Apostolic Prefecture of Battambang
  - Apostolic Prefecture of Kompong Cham
- in China:
  - Diocese of Macau
  - Apostolic Prefecture of Baoqing (Paoking/ Shaoyang)
  - Apostolic Prefecture of Guilin (Kweilin)
  - Apostolic Prefecture of Hainan
  - Apostolic Prefecture of Haizhou (Donghai/ Haichow)
  - Apostolic Prefecture of Jiamusi (Kiamusze)
  - Apostolic Prefecture of Jian’ou (Jianning/ Kienning/ Kienow)
  - Apostolic Prefecture of Lindong (Lintung)
  - Apostolic Prefecture of Linqing (Lintsing)
  - Apostolic Prefecture of Lixian (Lizhou/ Lichow)
  - Apostolic Prefecture of Qiqihar (Tsitsikar)
  - Apostolic Prefecture of Shaowu
  - Apostolic Prefecture of Shashi (Shasi)
  - Apostolic Prefecture of Shiqian (Shihtsien)
  - Apostolic Prefecture of Suixian (Suihsien)
  - Apostolic Prefecture of Tongzhou (Tungchow)
  - Apostolic Prefecture of Tunxi (Tunki)
  - Apostolic Prefecture of Weihai (Weihaiwei)
  - Apostolic Prefecture of Xiangtan (Siangtan)
  - Apostolic Prefecture of Xing’anfu (Ankang/ Hinganfu)
  - Apostolic Prefecture of Xining (Sining)
  - Apostolic Prefecture of Xinjiang (Jiangzhou/ Kiangchow)
  - Apostolic Prefecture of Xinjiang-Urumqi (Urumqi/ Sinkiang/ Xinjiang)
  - Apostolic Prefecture of Xinxiang (Sinsiang)
  - Apostolic Prefecture of Yangzhou (Yangchow)
  - Apostolic Prefecture of Yiduxian (Iduhsien)
  - Apostolic Prefecture of Yixian (Yihsien)
  - Apostolic Prefecture of Yongzhou (Lingling/ Yungchow)
  - Apostolic Prefecture of Yueyang (Yuezhou/ Yochow)
  - Apostolic Prefecture of Zhaotong (Chaotung)
  - Russian Catholic Apostolic Exarchate of Harbin, with former cathedral see in Harbin
- in India:
  - Syro-Malankara Catholic Eparchy of Gurgaon, see located near Delhi, serving 22 states of India
- in Indonesia: Military Ordinariate of Indonesia
- in and for all Iran (Persia): Archdiocese of Teheran-Isfahan
- Personal Ordinariate of Our Lady of the Southern Cross (for former Anglicans in Australia and Japan).
- in Korea (North and South):
  - Military Ordinariate of South Korea
  - Territorial Abbacy of Tŏkwon, alias Tŏkugen abbey, with a cathedral see, in North Korea
- all dioceses in Laos (joined in a common episcopal conference with Cambodia):
  - Apostolic Vicariate of Luang Prabang
  - Apostolic Vicariate of Pakse
  - Apostolic Vicariate of Savannakhet
  - Apostolic Vicariate of Vientiane
- in the Philippines:
  - Military Ordinariate of the Philippines
  - Apostolic Vicariate of Bontoc-Lagawe
  - Apostolic Vicariate of Jolo
  - Apostolic Vicariate of Puerto Princesa
  - Apostolic Vicariate of San Jose in Mindoro
  - Apostolic Vicariate of Tabuk
  - Apostolic Vicariate of Taytay
- in Pakistan: Apostolic Vicariate of Quetta
- in Russia (cfr. Europe): Apostolic Prefecture of Yuzhno Sakhalinsk, on Sakhalin island off eastern Siberia
- in and for all Singapore: Archdiocese of Singapore
- in Turkey:
  - Greek Catholic Apostolic Exarchate of Istanbul, with see in Istanbul, for all Turkey

=== New World exempt dioceses ===
- in Argentina:
  - Military Ordinariate of Argentina
  - Ordinariate for Eastern Catholics in Argentina, for all Eastern Churches, vested in the Latin Church Metropolitan Archbishop of capital Buenos Aires
- in Australia:
  - Military Ordinariate of Australia
  - Archdiocese of Canberra and Goulburn
  - Archdiocese of Hobart
  - Personal Ordinariate of Our Lady of the Southern Cross (for former Anglicans in Australia and Japan, with cathedral see in Melbourne, Australia).
- in Bolivia:
  - Military Ordinariate of Bolivia
  - Apostolic Vicariate of Camiri
  - Apostolic Vicariate of El Beni
  - Apostolic Vicariate of Ñuflo de Chávez
  - Apostolic Vicariate of Pando
  - Apostolic Vicariate of Reyes
- in Brazil:
  - Military Ordinariate of Brazil
  - Ordinariate for Eastern Catholics in Brazil, for all Eastern Churches, cumulated with various Latin Church Metropolitan sees
  - Personal Apostolic Administration of São João Maria Vianney, cumulated with Diocese of Campos
- in Canada:
  - Military Ordinariate of Canada
  - Archdiocese of Winnipeg
  - Syriac Catholic Apostolic Exarchate of Canada (Antiochian Rite), with cathedral see at Montréal, Québec
- in Chile:
  - Military Ordinariate of Chile
  - Apostolic Vicariate of Aysén
- in Colombia:
  - Military Ordinariate of Colombia
  - Apostolic Vicariate of Guapi
  - Apostolic Vicariate of Inírida
  - Apostolic Vicariate of Leticia
  - Apostolic Vicariate of Mitú
  - Apostolic Vicariate of Puerto Carreño
  - Apostolic Vicariate of Puerto Leguízamo–Solano
  - Apostolic Vicariate of Puerto Carreño
  - Apostolic Vicariate of San Andrés y Providencia
  - Apostolic Vicariate of San Vicente del Caguán
  - Apostolic Vicariate of Tierradentro
  - Apostolic Vicariate of Trinidad
- in Dominican Republic: Military Ordinariate of Dominican Republic
- in Ecuador:
  - Military Ordinariate of Ecuador
  - Apostolic Vicariate of Aguarico
  - Apostolic Vicariate of Esmeraldas
  - Apostolic Vicariate of Galápagos
  - Apostolic Vicariate of Méndez
  - Apostolic Vicariate of Napo
  - Apostolic Vicariate of Puyo
  - Apostolic Vicariate of San Miguel de Sucumbíos
  - Apostolic Vicariate of Zamora in Ecuador
- in El Salvador: Military Ordinariate of El Salvador
- Apostolic Prefecture of Falkland Islands, for the Southern Atlantic UK overseas territories Falkland Islands (Malvinas) and South Georgia and the South Sandwich Islands
- in New Zealand: Military Ordinariate of New Zealand
- in Paraguay:
  - Military Ordinariate of Paraguay
  - Apostolic Vicariate of Chaco Paraguayo
  - Apostolic Vicariate of Pilcomayo
- in Peru:
  - Military Ordinariate of Peru
  - Apostolic Vicariate of Iquitos
  - Apostolic Vicariate of Jaén in Peru
  - Apostolic Vicariate of Pucallpa
  - Apostolic Vicariate of Puerto Maldonado
  - Apostolic Vicariate of Requena
  - Apostolic Vicariate of San José de Amazonas
  - Apostolic Vicariate of San Ramón
  - Apostolic Vicariate of Yurimaguas
- in Tonga:
  - Diocese of Tonga
- in the United States:
  - Military ordinariate of the United States: Archdiocese for the Military Services, USA
  - Personal Ordinariate of the Chair of Saint Peter, with see in Houston, Texas (for former Anglicans in the United States and in Canada)
  - Romanian Catholic Eparchy of St George's in Canton, bishopric for the diaspora in North America (also Canada), with cathedral see in Canton, Ohio (U.S.)
  - Syro-Malankara Catholic Eparchy of St. Mary, Queen of Peace, of the United States of America and Canada, with cathedral see at Elmont, New York
  - Maronite Eparchies of St. Maron of Brooklyn and of Our Lady of Lebanon of Los Angeles
- in Venezuela:
  - Military Ordinariate of Venezuela
  - Apostolic Vicariate of Caroní
  - Apostolic Vicariate of Puerto Ayacucho
  - Apostolic Vicariate of Tucupita
  - Melkite Greek Catholic Apostolic Exarchate of Venezuela (Byzantine Rite), with cathedral see in Caracas
  - Syriac Catholic Apostolic Exarchate of Venezuela (Antiochian Rite), with cathedral see at Maracay, Aragua

=== African exempt dioceses ===
- in Algeria: Diocese of Laghouat
- in Chad: Apostolic Vicariate of Mongo
- in Cape Verde:
  - Diocese of Mindelo
  - Diocese of Santiago de Cabo Verde
- in and for all the Comoros, also for Mayotte: Apostolic Vicariate of Comoros Archipelago
- in and for all Djibouti: Diocese of Djibouti
- in Ethiopia, where all Latin circonscriptions are missionary:
  - Apostolic Vicariate of Awasa
  - Apostolic Vicariate of Gambella
  - Apostolic Vicariate of Harar
  - Apostolic Vicariate of Hosanna
  - Apostolic Vicariate of Jimma-Bonga, at Jimma
  - Apostolic Vicariate of Meki
  - Apostolic Vicariate of Nekemte
  - Apostolic Vicariate of Soddo
  - Apostolic Prefecture of Robe
- in Gabon: Apostolic Vicariate of Makokou
- in and for all The Gambia: Diocese of Banjul
- in Guinea-Bissau:
  - Diocese of Bafatá
  - Diocese of Bissau
- in Kenya:
  - Military Ordinariate of Kenya
  - Apostolic Vicariate of Isiolo
- in Libya:
  - Apostolic Vicariate of Benghazi
  - Apostolic Vicariate of Derna
  - Apostolic Vicariate of Tripoli
  - Apostolic Prefecture of Misurata
- in and for all Mauritania: Diocese of Nouakchott
- on and for all Mauritius: Diocese of Port-Louis
- in Morocco:
  - Archdiocese of Rabat
  - Archdiocese of Tanger
- on and for all the French territory Réunion: Diocese of Saint-Denis-de-La Réunion
- in Nigeria:
  - Maronite Apostolic Exarchate of Western and Central Africa, with cathedral see Church of Our Lady of the Annunciation, in Ibadan, Oyo state
- in and for all São Tomé and Príncipe: Diocese of São Tomé and Príncipe
- on and for all the Seychelles: Diocese of Port Victoria o Seychelles
- in and for all Somalia: Diocese of Mogadiscio
- in South Africa:
  - Military Ordinariate of South Africa
  - Apostolic Vicariate of Ingwavuma
- in and for all Tunisia: Archdiocese of Tunis
- in Uganda: Military Ordinariate of Uganda
- in and for all Western Sahara: Apostolic Prefecture of Western Sahara

== Europe (Latin and Eastern Churches) ==
There are also 'meetings of episcopal conferences' for the (arch)bishops from countries belonging to:

- European Union
- Council of Europe

=== Exempt dioceses in European countries without ecclesiastical province or national conference ===
Exempt (arch)dioceses, directly subject to the Holy See, each for a whole small country

- Archdiocese of Vaduz (1997), for Liechtenstein
- Archdiocese of Luxembourg (1870), for Luxembourg
- Archdiocese of Monaco (1887), for Monaco
- Apostolic Administration of Estonia (at Tallinn), for all Estonia
- Diocese of Chişinău (2001), for all Moldova (Moldavia)
- Diocese of Prizren-Pristina (2018), for all Kosovo & Preševo Valley

=== Episcopal Conference of Austria ===
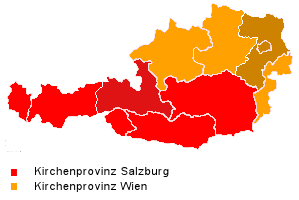

Exempt dioceses, immediately subject to the Holy See

- Military Ordinariate of Austria (1986), not vested in any see
- Territorial Abbacy of Wettingen-Mehrerau
- Ordinariate for Byzantine-rite Catholics in Austria (1956), vested in the (Latin Church) Metropolitan Archbishop of capital Vienna, for Byzantine Rite Eastern Catholic churches

Ecclesiastical Province of Salzburg

- Metropolitan Archdiocese of Salzburg (739), primatial see of Austria, a former prince-bishopric
  - Diocese of Feldkirch (1968)
  - Diocese of Graz-Seckau (1218)
  - Diocese of Gurk (1072)
  - Diocese of Innsbruck (1964)

Ecclesiastical Province of Vienna

- Metropolitan Archdiocese of Vienna (1469)
  - Diocese of Eisenstadt (1960)
  - Diocese of Linz (1785)
  - Diocese of Sankt Pölten (1785)

=== Episcopal Conference of Belgium ===
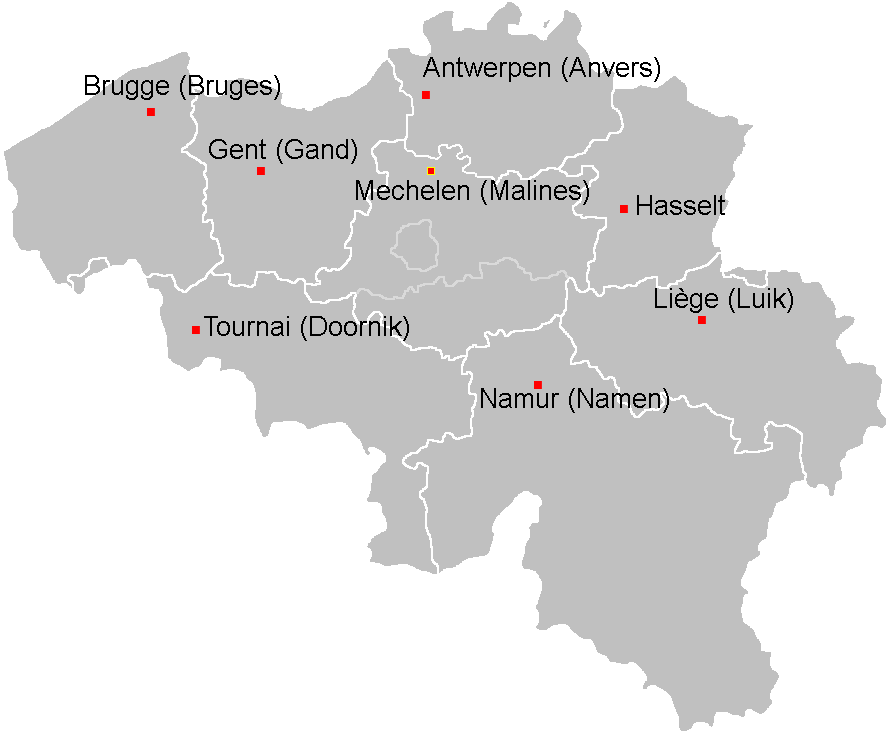

Exempt, immediately subject to the Holy See

- Military Ordinariate of Belgium (1986), ranking as bishopric, vested in the primatial Metropolitan see of Mechelen-Brussels
- For the Ukrainian Catholics, see France

Ecclesiastical Province of Mechelen–Brussels, covering Belgium

- Metropolitan Archdiocese of Mechelen–Brussels (1559), primatial see of Belgium
  - Diocese of Antwerp (1961)
  - Diocese of Bruges (1559)
  - Diocese of Ghent (1559)
  - Diocese of Hasselt (1967)
  - Diocese of Liège (4th century)
  - Diocese of Namur (1559)
  - Diocese of Tournai (1146)

=== Episcopal Conference of England and Wales (parts of the UK) ===
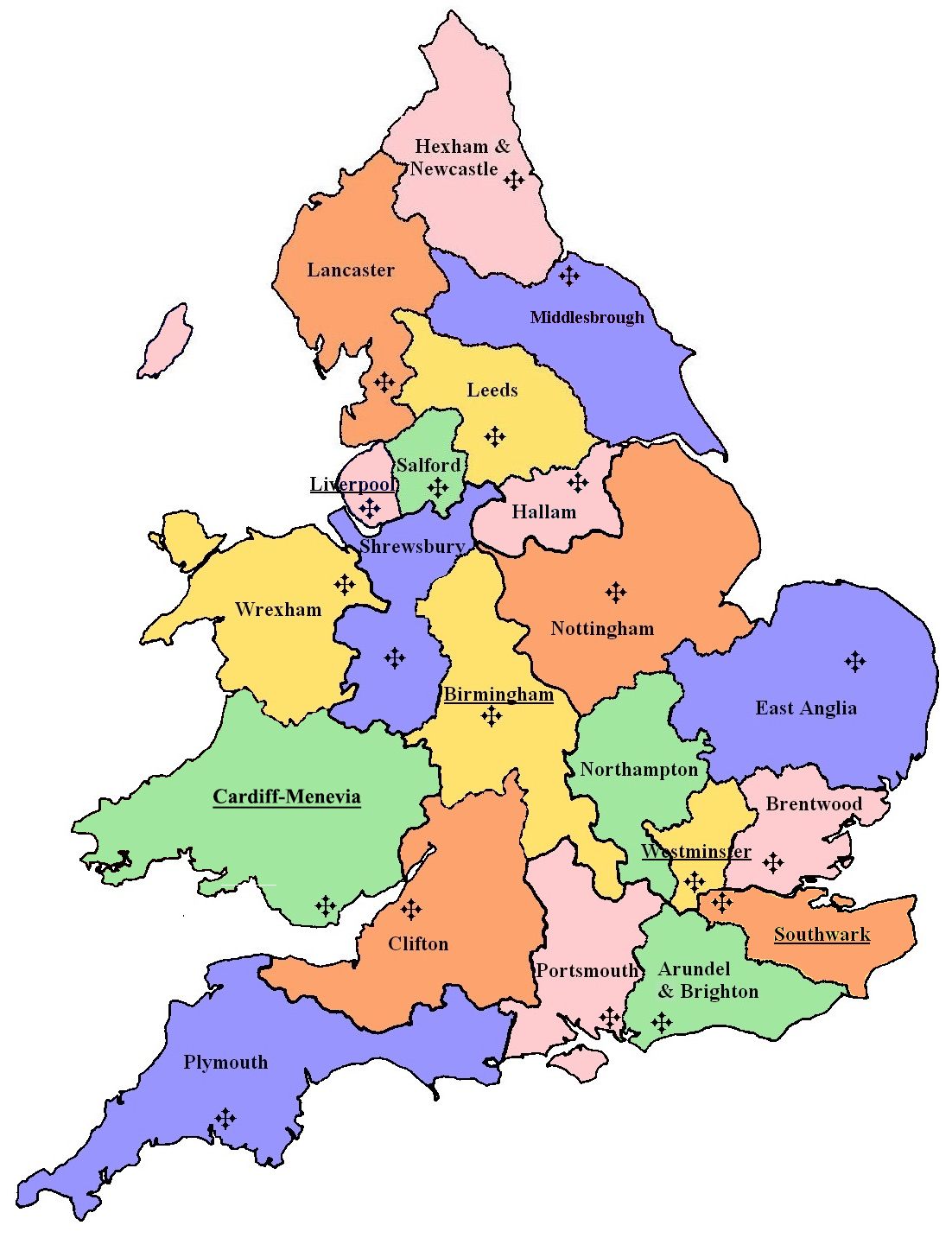
Dioceses in England and Wales

also comprises - without separate dioceses - three European insular crown dependencies of the Isle of Man, Jersey and Guernsey

Exempt dioceses

- the Bishopric of the Forces in Great Britain (1986) (for UK-based troops, joint with Scotland)
- Personal Ordinariate of Our Lady of Walsingham (2011) (for former Anglicans in England and Wales and in Scotland)
- Ukrainian Catholic Eparchy of the Holy Family of London (2013) (for the Ukrainian Catholics in Great Britain, with cathedral see in London, for the whole UK, including Scotland)
- Syro-Malabar Catholic Eparchy of Great Britain (2016) (for the Syro-Malabar Catholics in Great Britain, with cathedral see in Preston, for the whole UK, without Northern Ireland)
- Diocese of Gibraltar (1910), for Gibraltar (British crown colony)
- Apostolic Prefecture of Falkland Islands, for the Southern Atlantic UK overseas territories Falkland Islands and South Georgia and the South Sandwich Islands
  - Mission sui juris of Saint Helena, Ascension and Tristan da Cunha; vested in the exempt, South American Apostolic Prefecture of the Falkland Islands

Ecclesiastical province of Birmingham

- Metropolitan Archdiocese of Birmingham (1850)
  - Diocese of Clifton (1850)
  - Diocese of Shrewsbury (1850)

Ecclesiastical province of Cardiff, for Wales

- Metropolitan Archdiocese of Cardiff-Menevia (1850) (including Herefordshire in England; merged with Diocese of Menevia)
  - Diocese of Wrexham (1987)

Ecclesiastical province of Liverpool

- Metropolitan Archdiocese of Liverpool (1850), also covers the isle of Man crown dependency
  - Diocese of Hallam (1980)
  - Diocese of Hexham and Newcastle (1850)
  - Diocese of Lancaster (1924)
  - Diocese of Leeds (1878)
  - Diocese of Middlesbrough (1878)
  - Diocese of Salford (1850)

Ecclesiastical province of Southwark

- Metropolitan Archdiocese of Southwark (1850)
  - Diocese of Arundel and Brighton (1965)
  - Diocese of Plymouth (1850)
  - Diocese of Portsmouth (1882), also covers both Anglo-Norman Channel Islands crown dependencies: Jersey and Guernsey

Ecclesiastical province of Westminster

- Metropolitan Diocese of Westminster (1850)
  - Diocese of Brentwood (1917)
  - Diocese of East Anglia (1976)
  - Diocese of Northampton (1850)
  - Diocese of Nottingham (1850)

=== Episcopal Conference of France ===
(The ecclesiastical provinces' corresponding administrative regions are mentioned in parentheses) For overseas French dioceses, see under their continents and Episcopal conferences of Antilles (Central America) and Pacific (Oceania)

Exempt Latin dioceses, directly subject to the Holy See

- Military Ordinariate of France (1986)
- Archdiocese of Strasbourg (4th century)
- Diocese of Metz (4th century)

Eastern Church dioceses, directly subject to the Holy See (exempt) or to their particular church's Patriarch or Major Archbishop

- Armenian Catholic Diocese of Sainte-Croix-de-Paris (1986), Eparchy with cathedral see in Paris, in and for France, immediately subject to the Patriarch of Cilicia, but not part of his province
- Maronite Eparchy of Notre-Dame du Liban de Paris (2012), with cathedral see Cathédrale Notre-Dame du Liban, Paris, immediately subject to the Patriarch of Cilicia, but not part of his province; also Apostolic Visitor in Western and Northern Europe of the Maronites
- Ukrainian Catholic Eparchy of Saint Vladimir the Great of Paris (2013) (Ukrainian Catholic Byzantine Rite Eparchy in France), with cathedral see in Paris, directly subject to the Major Archbishop, for France, Belgium, Luxembourg, the Netherlands and Switzerland
- Ordinariate for Eastern Catholics in France, exempt, vested in the Metropolitan Archbishop of capital Paris, for Eastern Rites without proper ordinary

Catholic dioceses of metropolitan France. Provinces are demarcated by bold lines and their sees (Metropolitan archdioceses) written in bold letters.

Ecclesiastical Province of Besançon (Franche-Comté and part of Lorraine)

- Metropolitan Archdiocese of Besançon (4th century)
  - Diocese of Belfort-Montbéliard (1979)
  - Diocese of Nancy (1777)
  - Diocese of Saint-Claude (1742)
  - Diocese of Saint-Dié (1777)
  - Diocese of Verdun (4th century)

Ecclesiastical Province of Bordeaux (Aquitaine)

- Metropolitan Archdiocese of Bordeaux (3rd century)
  - Diocese of Agen (4th century)
  - Diocese of Aire and Dax (5th century)
  - Diocese of Bayonne (5th century)
  - Diocese of Périgueux (4th century)

Ecclesiastical Province of Clermont (Auvergne)

- Metropolitan Archdiocese of Clermont (3rd century)
  - Diocese of Le Puy-en-Velay (4th century)
  - Diocese of Moulins (1822)
  - Diocese of Saint-Flour (1317)

Ecclesiastical Province of Dijon (Burgundy)

- Metropolitan Archdiocese of Dijon (1731)
  - Archdiocese of Sens (4th century)
  - Diocese of Autun (3rd century)
  - Diocese of Nevers (5th century)
  - Territorial prelature of the Mission de France at Pontigny

Ecclesiastical Province of Lille (Nord-Pas-de-Calais)

- Metropolitan Archdiocese of Lille
  - Archdiocese of Cambrai
  - Diocese of Arras

Ecclesiastical Province of Lyon (Rhône-Alpes)

- Metropolitan Archdiocese of Lyon, primatial see
  - Archdiocese of Chambéry
  - Diocese of Annecy (includes territory in Switzerland)
  - Diocese of Belley-Ars
  - Diocese of Grenoble-Vienne
  - Diocese of Saint-Étienne
  - Diocese of Valence
  - Diocese of Viviers

Ecclesiastical Province of Marseille (Provence-Alpes-Côte-d'Azur and Corsica)

- Metropolitan Archdiocese of Marseille
  - Archdiocese of Aix
  - Archdiocese of Avignon
  - Diocese of Ajaccio, on Corsica (both départements)
  - Diocese of Digne
  - Diocese of Fréjus-Toulon
  - Diocese of Gap
  - Diocese of Nice

Ecclesiastical Province of Montpellier (Languedoc-Roussillon)

- Metropolitan Archdiocese of Montpellier
  - Diocese of Carcassonne and Narbonne
  - Diocese of Mende
  - Diocese of Nîmes
  - Diocese of Perpignan-Elne (Rousillon)

Ecclesiastical Province of Paris (capital region Ile-de-France)

- Metropolitan Archdiocese of Paris
  - Diocese of Créteil
  - Diocese of Évry–Corbeil-Essonnes
  - Diocese of Meaux
  - Diocese of Nanterre
  - Diocese of Pontoise
  - Diocese of Saint-Denis
  - Diocese of Versailles

Ecclesiastical Province of Poitiers (Poitou-Charentes and Limousin)

- Metropolitan Archdiocese of Poitiers
  - Diocese of Angoulême
  - Diocese of La Rochelle, also covers the French Overseas Collectivity of Saint Pierre and Miquelon
  - Diocese of Limoges
  - Diocese of Tulle

Ecclesiastical Province of Reims (Champagne-Ardenne and Picardy)

- Metropolitan Archdiocese of Reims, primatial see
  - Diocese of Amiens
  - Diocese of Beauvais
  - Diocese of Châlons
  - Diocese of Langres
  - Diocese of Soissons
  - Diocese of Troyes

Ecclesiastical Province of Rennes (Brittany and Pays de la Loire)

- Metropolitan Archdiocese of Rennes
  - Diocese of Angers
  - Diocese of Laval
  - Diocese of Le Mans
  - Diocese of Luçon
  - Diocese of Nantes
  - Diocese of Quimper
  - Diocese of Saint-Brieuc
  - Diocese of Vannes

Ecclesiastical Province of Rouen (Upper - and Lower Normandy)

- Metropolitan Archdiocese of Rouen
  - Diocese of Bayeux
  - Diocese of Coutances
  - Diocese of Évreux
  - Diocese of Le Havre
  - Diocese of Séez

Eccleasiastical Province of Toulouse (Midi-Pyrénées)

- Metropolitan Archdiocese of Toulouse
  - Archdiocese of Albi
  - Archdiocese of Auch
  - Diocese of Cahors
  - Diocese of Montauban
  - Diocese of Pamiers
  - Diocese of Rodez
  - Diocese of Tarbes-et-Lourdes

Eccleasiastical Province of Tours (Centre-Val de Loire region)

- Metropolitan Archdiocese of Tours
  - Archdiocese of Bourges
  - Diocese of Blois
  - Diocese of Chartres
  - Diocese of Orléans

=== Episcopal Conference of Germany ===
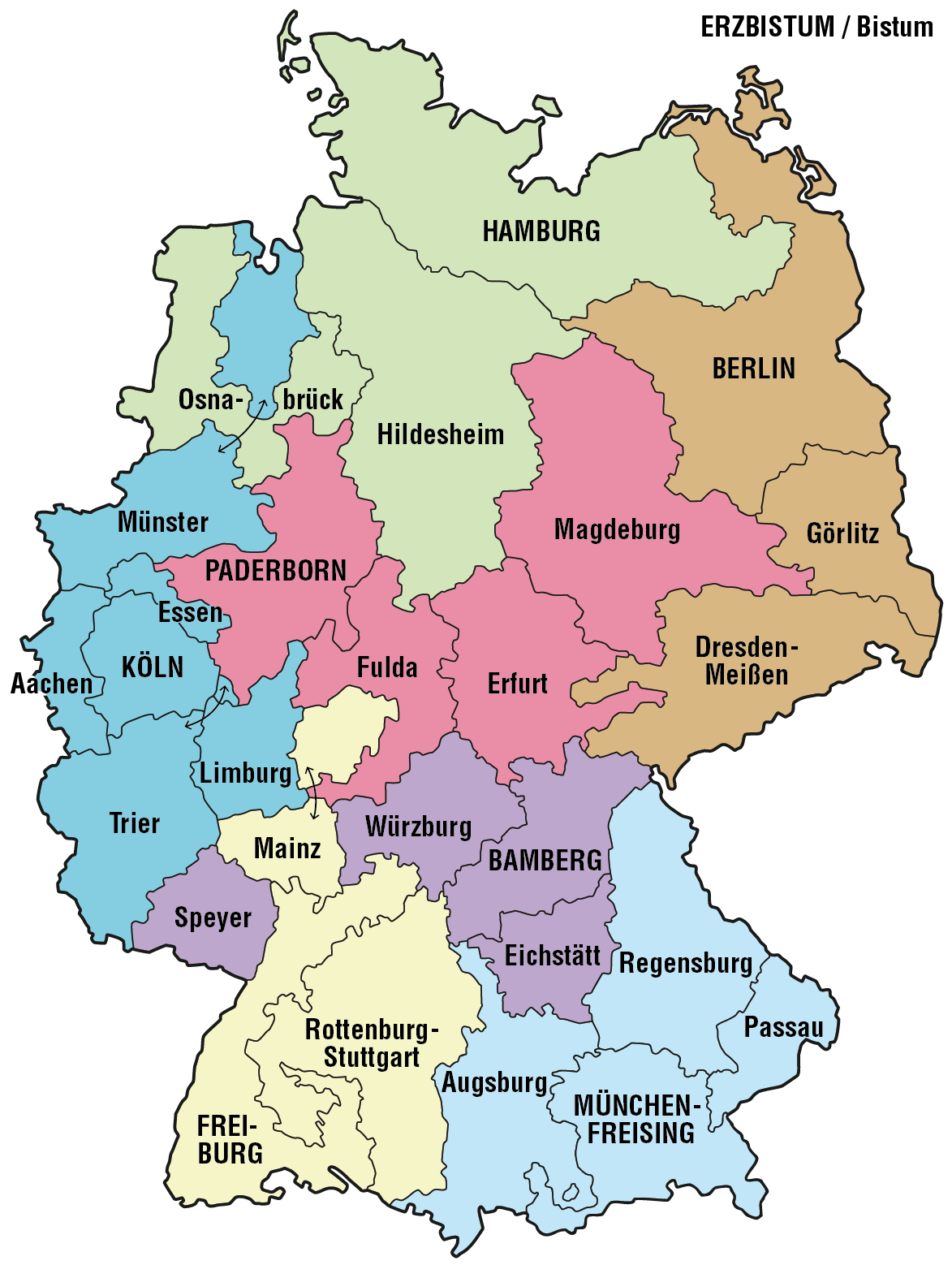
Provinces and Dioceses in Germany

Exempt, immediately subject to the Holy See

- Military Ordinariate in Germany (1986)
- Ukrainian Catholic Apostolic Exarchate of Germany and Scandinavia

Ecclesiastical province of Bamberg

- Metropolitan Archdiocese of Bamberg (1007)
  - Diocese of Eichstätt (745)
  - Diocese of Speyer (4th century)
  - Diocese of Würzburg (741)

Ecclesiastical province of Berlin

- Metropolitan Archdiocese of Berlin (1930)
  - Diocese of Dresden-Meissen (1921)
  - Diocese of Görlitz (1994)

[Lower] Rhenish ecclesiastical province (aka Ecclesiastical province of Cologne)

- Metropolitan Archdiocese of Cologne (4th century), formerly a prince-episcopal electorate
  - Diocese of Aachen (Aix-la-Chapelle) (1930)
  - Diocese of Essen (1958)
  - Diocese of Limburg (1827)
  - Diocese of Münster (800)
  - Diocese of Trier (3rd century), formerly a Metropolitan Archdiocese and prince-episcopal electorate

Upper Rhenish ecclesiastical province (aka Ecclesiastical province of Freiburg im Breisgau)

- Metropolitan Archdiocese of Freiburg (1821)
  - Diocese of Mainz (4th century), formerly a Metropolitan archdiocese and prince-episcopal electorate
  - Diocese of Rottenburg-Stuttgart (1821)

Northern German ecclesiastical province (aka Ecclesiastical province of Hamburg)

- Metropolitan Archdiocese of Hamburg (1994)
  - Diocese of Hildesheim (815)
  - Diocese of Osnabrück (772)

Ecclesiastical province of Munich and Freising, in Bavaria

- Metropolitan Archdiocese of Munich and Freising (739)
  - Diocese of Augsburg (4th century)
  - Diocese of Passau (739)
  - Diocese of Regensburg (739)

Central German ecclesiastical province (aka Ecclesiastical province of Paderborn)

- Metropolitan Archdiocese of Paderborn (799)
  - Diocese of Erfurt (1994)
  - Diocese of Fulda (1752)
  - Diocese of Magdeburg (1994)

=== Episcopal Conference of Ireland, i.e. the Republic of Ireland and Northern Ireland ===
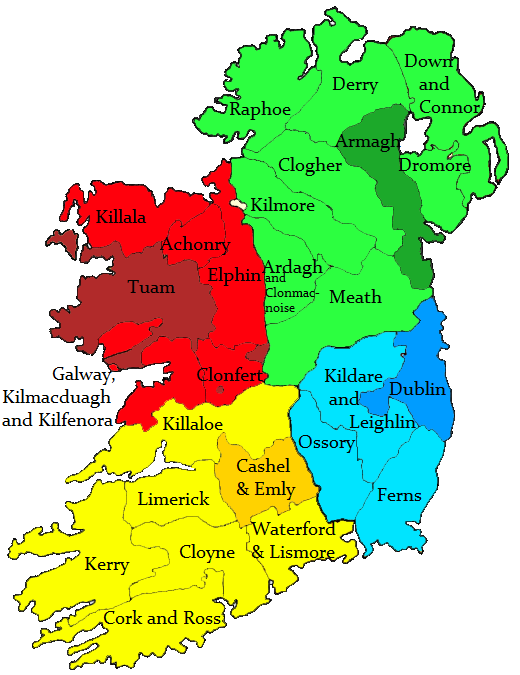
Catholic Dioceses in the island of Ireland. The colours indicate the ecclesiastical provinces, and the dark areas are archdioceses.

Ecclesiastical province of Armagh — covers all of Northern Ireland (part of the UK) and part of the Republic of Ireland

- Metropolitan Archdiocese of Armagh (5th century) (partly in Northern Ireland) Primatial See "of All Ireland"
  - Diocese of Ardagh and Clonmacnoise (9th century) (wholly in Republic of Ireland)
  - Diocese of Clogher (1111) (partly in Northern Ireland)
  - Diocese of Derry (1158) (mainly Northern Ireland)
  - Diocese of Down and Connor (5th century)(wholly in Northern Ireland)
  - Diocese of Dromore (wholly in Northern Ireland)
  - Diocese of Kilmore (mainly Republic of Ireland)
  - Diocese of Meath (wholly in Republic of Ireland)
  - Diocese of Raphoe (wholly in Republic of Ireland)

Ecclesiastical province of Cashel and Emly (Republic of Ireland)

- Metropolitan Archdiocese of Cashel and Emly
  - Diocese of Cloyne
  - Diocese of Cork and Ross
  - Diocese of Kerry
  - Diocese of Killaloe
  - Diocese of Limerick
  - Diocese of Waterford and Lismore

Ecclesiastical province of Dublin (Republic of Ireland)

- Metropolitan Archdiocese of Dublin, ranks below Armagh but Primatial See "of Ireland"
  - Diocese of Ferns
  - Diocese of Kildare and Leighlin
  - Diocese of Ossory

Ecclesiastical province of Tuam (Republic of Ireland)

- Metropolitan Archdiocese of Tuam
  - Diocese of Achonry
  - Diocese of Clonfert
  - Diocese of Elphin
  - Diocese of Galway and Kilmacduagh
  - Diocese of Killala

=== Episcopal Conference of Italy, including San Marino and Vatican City ===
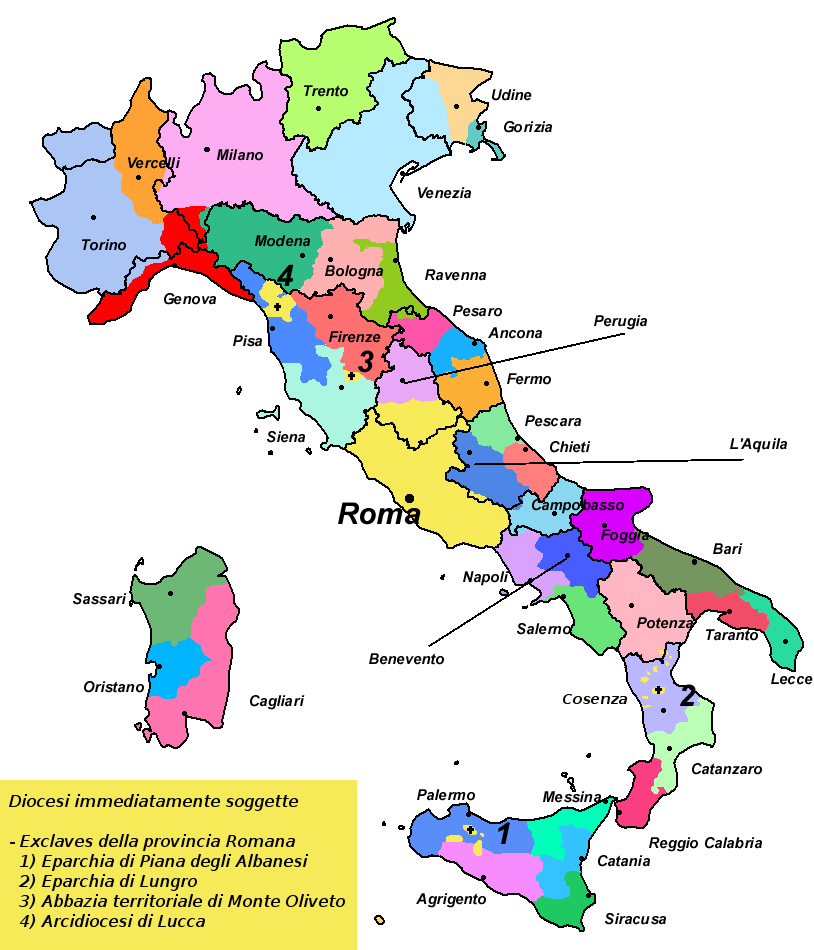
Catholic provinces in Italy

Ecclesiastical Province of Rome
See: Diocese of Rome § Suffragan sees

- Metropolitan Diocese of Rome (1st century) (includes the Vatican City State), whose suffragans are the seven suburbicarian sees, held by the six cardinal-bishops
  - Suburbicarian See of Ostia (3rd century), held besides another suburbicarian see by the cardinal-dean
  - Suburbicarian See of Albano
  - Suburbicarian See of Frascati (3rd century)
  - Suburbicarian See of Palestrina
  - Suburbicarian See of Porto-Santa Rufina
  - Suburbicarian See of Sabina-Poggio Mirteto
  - Suburbicarian See of Velletri-Segni

other exempt Italian (arch)dioceses, immediately subject to the Holy See but not part of the province of Rome

- Military Ordinariate of Italy
- Archdiocese of Gaeta (never Metropolitan)
- Archdiocese of Lucca (never Metropolitan)
- Archdiocese of Spoleto-Norcia (never Metropolitan)
- Diocese of Anagni-Alatri (5th century)
- Diocese of Civita Castellana
- Diocese of Civitavecchia-Tarquinia
- Diocese of Frosinone-Veroli-Ferentino
- Diocese of Latina-Terracina-Sezze-Priverno (4th century)
- Diocese of Orvieto-Todi
- Diocese of Rieti, united with the titular Territorial Abbacy of San Salvatore Maggiore
- Diocese of Sora-Cassino-Aquino-Pontecorvo
- Diocese of Terni-Narni-Amelia
- Diocese of Tivoli
- Diocese of Viterbo, united with the titular Territorial Abbacy of San Martino al Monte Cimino
- Italo-Albanese Territorial Abbacy of Santa Maria di Grottaferrata, only non-Latin Church territorial abbey: Italo-Albanese Catholic rite
- Italo-Albanese Diocese of Piana degli Albanesi, with cathedral see at Palermo, on Sicily
- Italo-Albanese Diocese of Lungro, with cathedral see at Lungro, near Cosenza in Calabria
- Ukrainian Catholic Apostolic Exarchate of Italy, with cathedral see at Rome
- Territorial Abbey of Montecassino
- Territorial Abbey of Monte Oliveto Maggiore
- Territorial Abbey of Subiaco

Ecclesiastical Province of Venice

- Patriarchate of Venice, as Metropolitan Archdiocese
  - Diocese of Adria-Rovigo
  - Diocese of Belluno-Feltre
  - Diocese of Chioggia
  - Diocese of Concordia-Pordenone
  - Diocese of Padua
  - Diocese of Treviso
  - Diocese of Verona
  - Diocese of Vicenza
  - Diocese of Vittorio Veneto

Ecclesiastical Province of Agrigento, on Sicily

- Metropolitan Archdiocese of Agrigento
  - Diocese of Caltanissetta
  - Diocese of Piazza Armerina

Ecclesiastical Province of Ancona-Osimo

- Metropolitan Archdiocese of Ancona-Osimo
  - Diocese of Fabriano-Matelica
  - Diocese of Iesi
  - Diocese of Senigallia
  - Territorial Prelature of Loreto

Ecclesiastical Province of Bari-Bitonto

- Metropolitan Archdiocese of Bari-Bitonto
  - Archdiocese of Trani-Barletta-Bisceglie (no longer Metropolitan)
  - Diocese of Altamura-Gravina-Acquaviva delle Fonti
  - Diocese of Andria
  - Diocese of Conversano-Monopoli
  - Diocese of Molfetta-Ruvo-Giovinazzo-Terlizzi

Ecclesiastical Province of Benevento

- Metropolitan Archdiocese of Benevento
  - Archdiocese of Sant'Angelo dei Lombardi-Conza-Nusco-Bisaccia (never Metropolitan)
  - Diocese of Ariano Irpino-Lacedonia
  - Diocese of Avellino
  - Diocese of Cerreto Sannita-Telese-Sant’Agata de’ Goti
  - Territorial Abbey of Montevergine

Ecclesiastical Province of Bologna

- Metropolitan Archdiocese of Bologna
  - Archdiocese of Ferrara-Comacchio (no longer Metropolitan; united with the now titular Territorial Abbacy of Pomposa)
  - Diocese of Faenza-Modigliana
  - Diocese of Imola

Ecclesiastical Province of Cagliari, on Sardinia

- Metropolitan Archdiocese of Cagliari
  - Diocese of Iglesias
  - Diocese of Lanusei
  - Diocese of Nuoro

Ecclesiastical Province of Campobasso-Boiano

- Metropolitan Archdiocese of Campobasso-Boiano
  - Diocese of Isernia-Venafro
  - Diocese of Termoli-Larino
  - Diocese of Trivento

Ecclesiastical Province of Catania, on Sicily

- Metropolitan Archdiocese of Catania
  - Diocese of Acireale
  - Diocese of Caltagirone

Ecclesiastical Province of Catanzaro-Squillace

- Metropolitan Archdiocese of Catanzaro-Squillace
  - Archdiocese of Crotone-Santa Severina (never Metropolitan)
  - Diocese of Lamezia Terme

Ecclesiastical Province of Chieti-Vasto

- Metropolitan Archdiocese of Chieti-Vasto
  - Archdiocese of Lanciano-Ortona (no longer Metropolitan)

Ecclesiastical Province of Cosenza-Bisignano

- Metropolitan Archdiocese of Cosenza-Bisignano
  - Archdiocese of Rossano-Cariati (never Metropolitan)
  - Diocese of Cassano all'Jonio
  - Diocese of San Marco Argentano-Scalea

Ecclesiastical Province of Fermo

- Metropolitan Archdiocese of Fermo
  - Archdiocese of Camerino-San Severino Marche (never Metropolitan)
  - Diocese of Ascoli Piceno
  - Diocese of Macerata-Tolentino-Recanati-Cingoli-Treia
  - Diocese of San Benedetto del Tronto-Ripatransone-Montalto

Ecclesiastical Province of Florence

- Metropolitan Archdiocese of Florence
  - Diocese of Arezzo-Cortona-Sansepolcro
  - Diocese of Fiesole
  - Diocese of Pistoia
  - Diocese of Prato
  - Diocese of San Miniato

Ecclesiastical Province of Foggia-Bovino

- Metropolitan Archdiocese of Foggia-Bovino
  - Archdiocese of Manfredonia-Vieste-S. Giovanni Rotondo (no longer Metropolitan)
  - Diocese of Cerignola-Ascoli Satriano
  - Diocese of Lucera-Troia
  - Diocese of San Severo

Ecclesiastical Province of Genoa

- Metropolitan Archdiocese of Genoa
  - Diocese of Albenga-Imperia
  - Diocese of Chiavari
  - Diocese of La Spezia-Sarzana-Brugnato
  - Diocese of Savona-Noli
  - Diocese of Tortona
  - Diocese of Ventimiglia-San Remo

Ecclesiastical Province of Gorizia

- Metropolitan Archdiocese of Gorizia
  - Diocese of Trieste

Ecclesiastical Province of L'Aquila

- Metropolitan Archdiocese of L'Aquila
  - Diocese of Avezzano
  - Diocese of Sulmona-Valva

Ecclesiastical Province of Lecce

- Metropolitan Archdiocese of Lecce
  - Archdiocese of Brindisi-Ostuni (no longer Metropolitan)
  - Archdiocese of Otranto (no longer Metropolitan)
  - Diocese of Nardò-Gallipoli
  - Diocese of Ugento-Santa Maria di Leuca

Ecclesiastical Province of Messina-Lipari-Santa Lucia del Mela, on Sicily

- Metropolitan Archdiocese of Messina-Lipari-Santa Lucia del Mela, united with the titular Territorial Abbacy of Santissimo Salvatore
  - Diocese of Nicosia
  - Diocese of Patti

Ecclesiastical Province of Milan

- Metropolitan Archdiocese of Milan - This archdiocese also uses the now strictly local, Latin Ambrosian rite (Italian language) rite besides the general Roman Rite
  - Diocese of Bergamo
  - Diocese of Brescia
  - Diocese of Como
  - Diocese of Crema
  - Diocese of Cremona
  - Diocese of Lodi
  - Diocese of Mantua
  - Diocese of Pavia
  - Diocese of Vigevano

Ecclesiastical Province of Modena-Nonantola

- Metropolitan Archdiocese of Modena-Nonantola
  - Diocese of Carpi
  - Diocese of Fidenza
  - Diocese of Parma, united with the titular Territorial Abbacy of Fontevivo
  - Diocese of Piacenza-Bobbio, united with the titular Territorial Abbacy of San Colombano
  - Diocese of Reggio Emilia-Guastalla

Ecclesiastical Province of Naples

- Metropolitan Archdiocese of Naples
  - Archdiocese of Capua (no longer Metropolitan)
  - Archdiocese of Sorrento-Castellammare di Stabia (no longer Metropolitan)
  - Diocese of Acerra
  - Diocese of Alife-Caiazzo
  - Diocese of Aversa
  - Diocese of Caserta
  - Diocese of Ischia
  - Diocese of Nola
  - Diocese of Pozzuoli
  - Diocese of Sessa Aurunca
  - Diocese of Teano-Calvi
  - Territorial Prelature of Pompei o Beatissima Vergine Maria del SS.mo Rosario (Pompei aka Blessed Virgin of the Most Sacred Rosary)

Ecclesiastical Province of Oristano

- Metropolitan Archdiocese of Oristano
  - Diocese of Ales-Terralba

Ecclesiastical Province of Palermo, on Sicily

- Metropolitan Archdiocese of Palermo
  - Archdiocese of Monreale (no longer Metropolitan; originally a territorial abbacy)
  - Diocese of Cefalu
  - Diocese of Mazara del Vallo
  - Diocese of Trapani

Ecclesiastical Province of Perugia-Città della Pieve

- Metropolitan Archdiocese of Perugia-Città della Pieve
  - Diocese of Assisi-Nocera Umbra-Gualdo Tadino
  - Diocese of Città di Castello
  - Diocese of Foligno
  - Diocese of Gubbio

Ecclesiastical Province of Pesaro

- Metropolitan Archdiocese of Pesaro
  - Archdiocese of Urbino-Urbania-Sant'Angelo in Vado (no longer Metropolitan)
  - Diocese of Fano-Fossombrone-Cagli-Pergola

Ecclesiastical Province of Pescara-Penne

- Metropolitan Archdiocese of Pescara-Penne
  - Diocese of Teramo-Atri

Ecclesiastical Province of Pisa

- Metropolitan Archdiocese of Pisa
  - Diocese of Livorno
  - Diocese of Massa Carrara-Pontremoli
  - Diocese of Pescia
  - Diocese of Volterra

Ecclesiastical Province of Potenza-Muro Lucano-Marsico Nuovo

- Metropolitan Archdiocese of Potenza-Muro Lucano-Marsico Nuovo
  - Archdiocese of Acerenza (no longer Metropolitan)
  - Archdiocese of Matera-Irsina (no longer Metropolitan), united with the titular Territorial Abbacy of San Michele Arcangelo di Montescaglioso
  - Diocese of Melfi-Rapolla-Venosa
  - Diocese of Tricarico
  - Diocese of Tursi-Lagonegro

Ecclesiastical Province of Ravenna-Cervia

- Metropolitan Archdiocese of Ravenna-Cervia
  - Diocese of Cesena-Sarsina
  - Diocese of Forli-Bertinoro
  - Diocese of Rimini
  - Diocese of San Marino-Montefeltro (includes the independent republic of San Marino but has its see in Pennabilli, in Italy's Province of Rimini

Ecclesiastical Province of Reggio Calabria-Bova

- Metropolitan Archdiocese of Reggio Calabria-Bova
  - Diocese of Locri-Gerace, united with the titular Territorial Abbacy of Santa Maria di Polsi
  - Diocese of Mileto-Nicotera-Tropea
  - Diocese of Oppido Mamertina-Palmi

Ecclesiastical Province of Salerno-Campagna-Acerno

- Metropolitan Archdiocese of Salerno-Campagna-Acerno
  - Archdiocese of Amalfi-Cava de' Tirreni (no longer Metropolitan)
  - Diocese of Nocera Inferiore-Sarno
  - Diocese of Teggiano-Policastro
  - Diocese of Vallo della Lucania
  - Territorial Abbey of Santissima Trinità di Cava de' Tirreni

Ecclesiastical Province of Sassari, on Sardinia

- Metropolitan Archdiocese of Sassari
  - Diocese of Alghero-Bosa
  - Diocese of Ozieri
  - Diocese of Tempio-Ampurias

Ecclesiastical Province of Siena-Colle di Val d'Elsa-Montalcino

- Metropolitan Archdiocese of Siena-Colle di Val d'Elsa-Montalcino
  - Diocese of Grosseto
  - Diocese of Massa Marittima-Piombino
  - Diocese of Montepulciano-Chiusi-Pienza
  - Diocese of Pitigliano-Sovana-Orbetello

Ecclesiastical Province of Siracusa, on Sicily

- Metropolitan Archdiocese of Siracusa
  - Diocese of Noto
  - Diocese of Ragusa

Ecclesiastical Province of Taranto

- Metropolitan Archdiocese of Taranto
  - Diocese of Castellaneta
  - Diocese of Oria

Ecclesiastical Province of Turin

- Metropolitan Archdiocese of Turin
  - Diocese of Acqui
  - Diocese of Alba Pompeia
  - Diocese of Aosta
  - Diocese of Asti
  - Diocese of Cuneo
  - Diocese of Fossano
  - Diocese of Ivrea
  - Diocese of Mondovi
  - Diocese of Pinerolo
  - Diocese of Saluzzo
  - Diocese of Susa

Ecclesiastical Province of Trento

- Metropolitan Archdiocese of Trento
  - Diocese of Bolzano-Brixen

Ecclesiastical Province of Udine

- Archdiocese of Udine (nominal Metropolitan, no suffragan)

Ecclesiastical Province of Vercelli

- Metropolitan Archdiocese of Vercelli
  - Diocese of Alessandria della Paglia
  - Diocese of Biella
  - Diocese of Casale Monferrato
  - Diocese of Novara

=== Episcopal Conference of Malta ===
Ecclesiastical Province of Malta

- Metropolitan Archdiocese of Malta (1st century)
  - Diocese of Gozo (1864)

=== Episcopal Conference of the Netherlands ===
Exempt, i.e. directly subject to the Holy See

- Military Ordinariate of the Netherlands
- For the Ukrainian Catholics, see France

Ecclesiastical Province of Utrecht, covering the Netherlands proper

- Metropolitan Archdiocese of Utrecht (1853)
  - Diocese of Breda (1853)
  - Diocese of Groningen-Leeuwarden (1956)
  - Diocese of Haarlem-Amsterdam (1853)
  - Diocese of Roermond (1853)
  - Diocese of Rotterdam (1955)
  - Diocese of 's-Hertogenbosch (1853)

=== Episcopal Conference of Portugal, incl. Azores and Madeira ===
Portuguese Catholic dioceses map

Exempt, i.e. directly subject to the Holy See

- Military Ordinariate of Portugal (the 'Army Bishopric')

Ecclesiastical Province of Lisboa (Lisbon)

- Patriarchate of Lisboa (1147), the province's Metropolitan Archdiocese at Lisbon
  - Diocese of Guarda (1199)
  - Diocese of Leiria-Fátima (1545)
  - Diocese of Portalegre-Castelo Branco (1550)
  - Diocese of Santarém (1975)
  - Diocese of Setúbal (1975)
  - Diocese of Angra (1534), on the Azores
  - Diocese of Funchal (1514), on and also known as Diocese of Madeira

Ecclesiastical Province of Braga

- Metropolitan Archdiocese of Braga (4th century), primatial see of “the Spains”
  - Diocese of Aveiro
  - Diocese of Bragança-Miranda
  - Diocese of Coimbra
  - Diocese of Lamego
  - Diocese of Porto
  - Diocese of Viana do Castelo
  - Diocese of Vila Real
  - Diocese of Viseu

Ecclesiastical Province of Évora

- Metropolitan Archdiocese of Évora
  - Diocese of Beja
  - Diocese of Faro, also known as Diocese of the Algarve

=== Episcopal Conference of Scandinavia ===
Scandinavian Bishops Conference

All exempt, each directly subject to the Holy See, no provincial or national conferences

- Diocese of Stockholm (1953), for all of Sweden
- Diocese of Copenhagen (1953), for all of Denmark and its overseas territories Greenland and the Faroe Islands
- Diocese of Oslo (1953), for most of Norway plus its Arctic territories Svalbard and Jan Mayen and uninhabited Bouvet Island
  - Territorial Prelature of Trondheim in Norway
  - Territorial Prelature of Tromsø in Norway

(and two more Nordic countries, not geographically part of Scandinavia proper, also both exempt)

- Diocese of Helsinki (1955), for all of Finland and the autonomous region of Åland
- Diocese of Reykjavík (1968), for all of Iceland

=== Episcopal Conference of Scotland (part of UK) ===
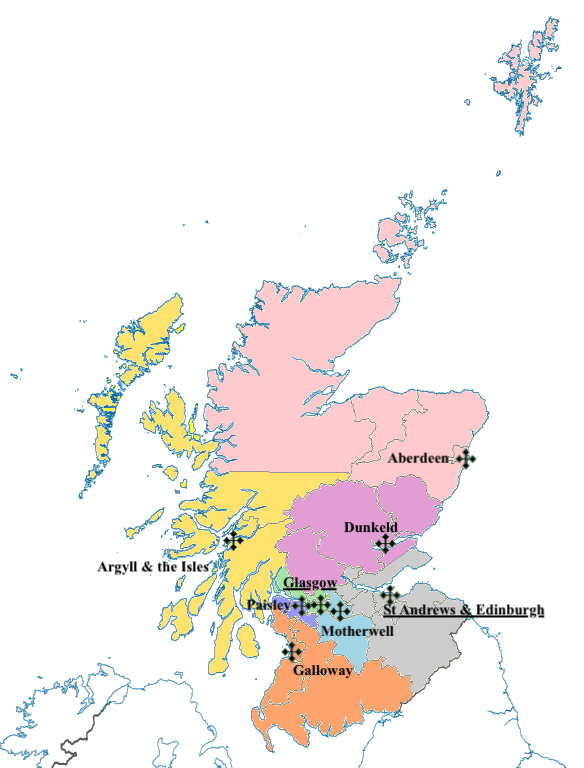
Map of Catholic dioceses in Scotland

the Military Ordinariate for Great-Britain for UK-based troops, being joint with England & Wales, is exempt, i.e. directly subject to the Holy See

Ecclesiastical province of Glasgow

- Metropolitan Archdiocese of Glasgow
  - Diocese of Motherwell
  - Diocese of Paisley

Ecclesiastical province of St Andrews and Edinburgh

- Metropolitan Archdiocese of St Andrews and Edinburgh
  - Diocese of Aberdeen
  - Diocese of Argyll and the Isles
  - Diocese of Dunkeld
  - Diocese of Galloway

Map of Dioceses of Spain

=== Episcopal Conference of Spain (incl. African territories) and Andorra ===
- Titular Patriarchate of the West Indies, indefinitely vacant

Exempt, i.e. directly subject to the Holy See

- Military Ordinariate of Spain (the 'Army Bishopric')
- Ordinariate for the Faithful of Eastern Rite in Spain

Ecclesiastical province of Barcelona

- Metropolitan Archdiocese of Barcelona (850)
  - Diocese of Sant Feliu de Llobregat (2004)
  - Diocese of Terrassa (2004)

Ecclesiastical province of Burgos

- Metropolitan Archdiocese of Burgos (1075)
  - Diocese of Bilbao (1949)
  - Diocese of Osma-Soria
  - Diocese of Palencia (1034)
  - Diocese of Vitoria (1861)

Ecclesiastical province of Granada

- Metropolitan Archdiocese of Granada (1437)
  - Diocese of Almería (1492)
  - Diocese of Cartagena (1250)
  - Diocese of Guadix (1492)
  - Diocese of Jaén
  - Diocese of Málaga, including the North African territory Melilla, a Spanish enclave in Morocco

Ecclesiastical province of Madrid

- Metropolitan Archdiocese of Madrid (1885)
  - Diocese of Alcalá de Henares (1991)
  - Diocese of Getafe (1991)

Ecclesiastical province of Mérida-Badajoz

- Metropolitan Archdiocese of Mérida-Badajoz (1225)
  - Diocese of Coria-Cáceres
  - Diocese of Plasencia

Ecclesiastical province of Oviedo

- Metropolitan Archdiocese of Oviedo (811)
  - Diocese of Astorga
  - Diocese of León
  - Diocese of Santander

Ecclesiastical province of Pamplona

- Metropolitan Archdiocese of Pamplona y Tudela
  - Diocese of Calahorra and La Calzada-Logroño
  - Diocese of Jaca
  - Diocese of San Sebastián

Ecclesiastical province of Santiago de Compostela

- Metropolitan Archdiocese of Santiago de Compostela
  - Diocese of Lugo
  - Diocese of Mondoñedo-Ferrol
  - Diocese of Ourense
  - Diocese of Tui-Vigo

Ecclesiastical province of Seville, mainly comprising Andalusia

- Metropolitan Archdiocese of Seville
  - Diocese of Cádiz and Ceuta, including the North African territory Ceuta, a Spanish enclave in Morocco
  - Diocese of the Canaries (1406) (at Las Palmas, on Gran Canaria), geographically African
  - Diocese of Córdoba
  - Diocese of Huelva
  - Diocese of Jerez de la Frontera
  - Diocese of San Cristóbal de La Laguna (1819) (on Tenerife), geographically African

Ecclesiastical province of Tarragona

- Metropolitan Archdiocese of Tarragona
  - Diocese of Girona
  - Diocese of Lleida
  - Diocese of Solsona
  - Diocese of Tortosa
  - Diocese of (Seo de) Urgell, including Andorra, where the bishop still shares the joint sovereign status of 'co-prince' with the French head of state, making him the last true prince-bishop besides the pope
  - Diocese of Vic

Ecclesiastical province of Toledo

- Metropolitan Archdiocese of Toledo, primatial see of Spain - This archdiocese is the only one using a now strictly local Latin liturgical rite besides the general Roman Rite - Mozarabic rite (Latin language)
  - Diocese of Albacete
  - Diocese of Ciudad Real
  - Diocese of Cuenca
  - Diocese of Sigüenza-Guadalajara

Ecclesiastical province of Valencia, including the Balearic Isles

- Metropolitan Archdiocese of Valencia (1238)
  - Diocese of Ibiza
  - Diocese of Mallorca
  - Diocese of Menorca
  - Diocese of Orihuela-Alicante
  - Diocese of Segorbe-Castellón

Ecclesiastical province of Valladolid

- Metropolitan Archdiocese of Valladolid (1595)
  - Diocese of Ávila
  - Diocese of Ciudad Rodrigo
  - Diocese of Salamanca
  - Diocese of Segovia
  - Diocese of Zamora

Ecclesiastical province of Zaragoza

- Metropolitan Archdiocese of Zaragoza
  - Diocese of Barbastro-Monzón
  - Diocese of Huesca
  - Diocese of Tarazona
  - Diocese of Teruel and Albarracín

=== Episcopal Conference of Switzerland ===
Swiss Bishops Conference

only exempt dioceses, each immediately subject to the Holy See

- Diocese of Basel (7th century)
- Diocese of Chur (5th century)
- Diocese of Lausanne, Geneva and Fribourg (6th century)
- Diocese of Lugano
- Diocese of Sankt Gallen
- Diocese of Sion (Sitten)
- Territorial Abbacy of Maria Einsiedeln
- Territorial Abbacy of Saint-Maurice d’Agaune
- part of the French diocese of Annecy (in the ecclesiastical province of Lyon) is also on Swiss territory

=== Episcopal Conference of Albania ===
Ecclesiastical province of Shkodër–Pult: Archdiocese of Shkodër–Pult Diocese of Sapë Diocese of Lezhë Ecclesiastical province of Tiranë-Durrës: Archdiocese of Tiranë–Durrës Diocese of Rrëshen Apostolic Administration of Southern Albania

Ecclesiastical Province of Shkodër-Pult (Latin Church)

- Metropolitan Archdiocese of Shkodër-Pult (Scutari-Pulati) (4th century)
  - Diocese of Lezhë (formerly Alessio)
  - Diocese of Sapë

Ecclesiastical Province of Tiranë-Durrës (mixed Churches)

- Metropolitan Archdiocese of Tiranë-Durrës
  - Diocese of Rrëshen
  - Apostolic Administration of Southern Albania, the Byzantine Rite Albanese Catholic Church's only proper diocese

=== Episcopal Conference of Saints Cyril and Methodius - for North Macedonia, Montenegro and Serbia ===
North Macedonia has

- the Latin Diocese of Skopje (1816), a suffragan in the province of the Bosnian Metropolitan Archdiocese of Vrhbosna
- the Eastern Catholic (Byzantine Rite) Macedonian Catholic Church, comprising only the exempt Macedonian Catholic Eparchy of the Assumption of the Blessed Virgin Mary in Strumica-Skopje, vested in the above Latin Church bishop of Skopje

Montenegro has no national level, but two Latin dioceses

- the exempt senior see: Archdiocese of Bar, directly subject to the Holy See
- Diocese of Kotor, suffragan in the ecclesiastical province of the Croatian Metropolitan Archdiocese of Split–Makarska

Ecclesiastical Province of Beograd (Belgrado), Latin, covering Serbia

- Metropolitan Archdiocese of Belgrade
  - Diocese of Subotica
  - Diocese of Srijem, suffragan in the ecclesiastical province of the Croatian Metropolitan Archdiocese of Đakovo-Osijek
  - Diocese of Zrenjanin

Byzantine Catholic Eparchy of Saint Nicholas of Ruski Krstur, for Catholics of Byzantine Rite in Serbia

=== Episcopal Conference of Belarus ===
The Belarusian Catholic Church (Byzantine Rite) has no proper diocese presently, only an apostolic visitor for Belarus and another for abroad, neither vested in any see

(Latin) Ecclesiastical Province of Miensk-Mahiloǔ

- Metropolitan Archdiocese of Minsk-Mohilev
  - Diocese of Grodno
  - Diocese of Pinsk
  - Diocese of Vitebsk

=== Episcopal Conference of Bosnia and Herzegovina ===
Latin Catholic dioceses in Bosnia and Herzegovina: Archdiocese of Vrhbosna Diocese of Banja Luka Diocese of Mostar-Duvno Diocese of Trebinje-Mrkan Diocese of Gospić-Senj (Zavalje parish) Diocese of Šibenik (village Uništa)

Exempt, i.e. directly subject to the Holy See

- Military Ordinariate of Bosnia and Herzegovina, not vested in any see

Ecclesiastical Province of Sarajevo, covering all Bosnia and Herzegovina and ...

- Metropolitan Archdiocese of Vrhbosna (1881)
  - Diocese of Banja Luka (1881)
  - Diocese of Mostar-Duvno (1881)
  - Diocese of Trebinje-Mrkan (1881)
- the province also comprises the Diocese of Skopje, which covers North Macedonia and belongs to the episcopal conference of Saints Cyril and Method (Montenegro, North Macedonia and Serbia)

Croatian Catholic Eparchy of Križevci, the Croatian proper diocese of the Byzantine rite Eastern Croatian Catholic Church, suffragan of the Metropolitan of Zagreb, also covers Catholics of Byzantine Rite in all of Slovenia and Bosnia and Herzegovina

=== Episcopal Conference of Bulgaria ===
Bulgaria has no ecclesiastical province, only exempt Ordinariates, immediately subject to the Holy See, of two Churches

- Latin Church:
  - Diocese of Nicopoli
  - Diocese of Sofia and Plovdiv
- Bulgarian Catholic Apostolic Exarchate of Sofia, the only proper ordinariate of the Byzantine Rite particular Bulgarian Byzantine Catholic Church

=== Episcopal Conference of Croatia ===
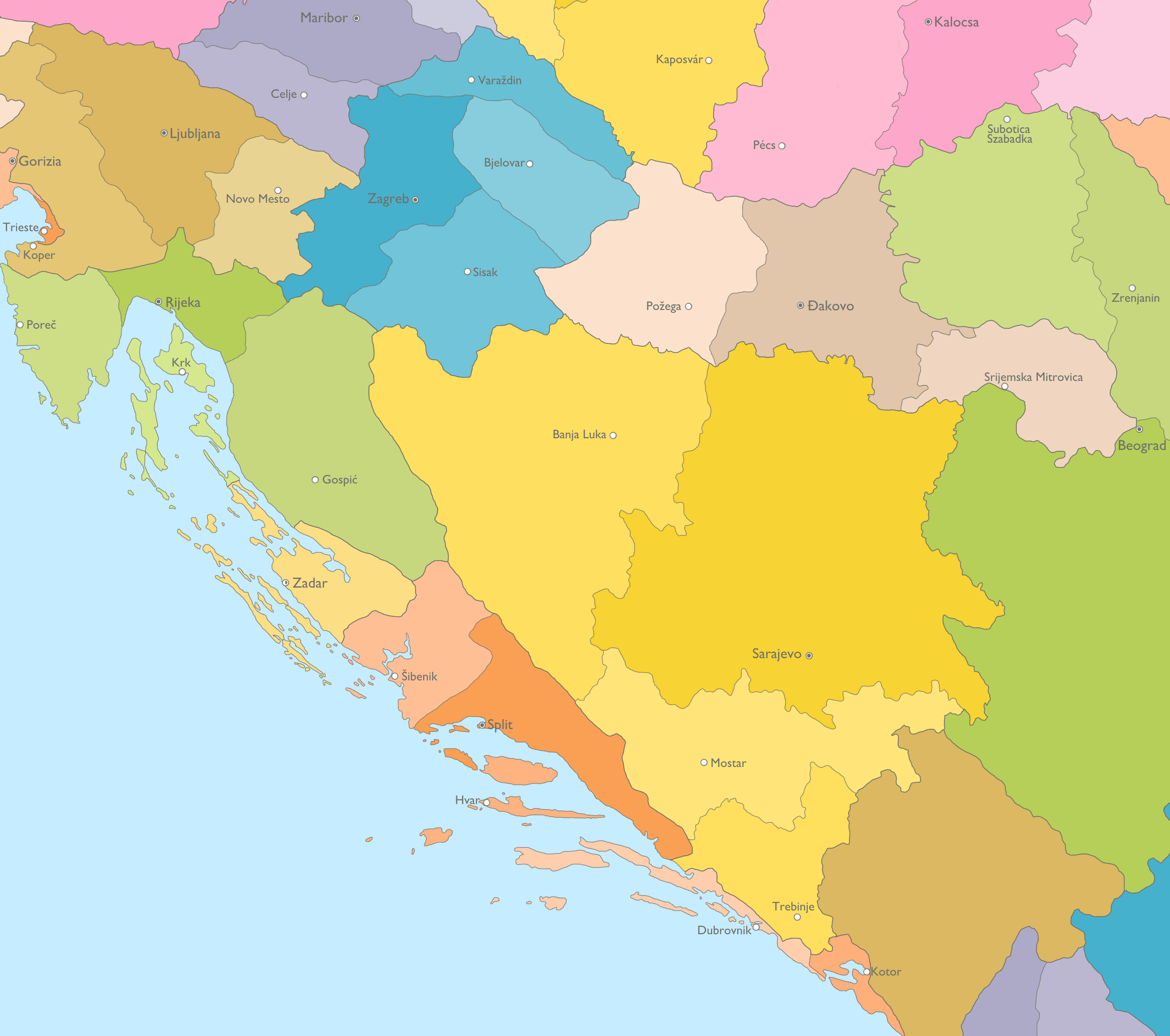
Ecclesiastical hierarchy and provinces in countries of Adriatic Sea: Croatia, Bosnia and Herzegovina, Slovenia, Montenegro

Exempt, immediately subject to the Holy See

- Military Ordinariate of Croatia, not vested in any see
- Archdiocese of Zadar (lost Metropolitan status)

Ecclesiastical Province of Đakovo-Osijek, also known as Simium (Sirmio)

- Metropolitan Archdiocese of Đakovo-Osijek
  - Diocese of Požega
- the province also comprises the Diocese of Srijem, which is in Serbia and hence belongs to the episcopal conference of Saints Cyril and Method (Montenegro, North Macedonia and Serbia)

Ecclesiastical Province of Rijeka

- Metropolitan Archdiocese of Rijeka
  - Diocese of Gospić–Senj
  - Diocese of Krk
  - Diocese of Poreč-Pula

Ecclesiastical Province of Split-Makarska

- Metropolitan Archdiocese of Split-Makarska
  - Diocese of Dubrovnik
  - Diocese of Hvar-Brač-Vis
  - Diocese of Šibenik
- the province also comprises the Diocese of Kotor, which is in and covers Montenegro and hence belongs to the episcopal conference of Saints Cyril and Method (Montenegro, North Macedonia and Serbia)

Ecclesiastical Province of Zagreb (Latin and Eastern Churches)

- Metropolitan Archdiocese of Zagreb (Roman Catholic)
  - Roman Catholic Diocese of Bjelovar-Križevci
  - Roman Catholic Diocese of Sisak
  - Roman Catholic Diocese of Varaždin
  - Croatian Catholic Eparchy of Križevci, the only proper diocese of the Byzantine rite Eastern Croatian Catholic Church, covering all of Croatia, Slovenia and Bosnia and Herzegovina

=== Episcopal Conference of the Czech Republic ===
Exempt, i.e. immediately subject to the Holy See

- Ruthenian Apostolic Exarchate of Czech Republic (Byzantine rite)

Ecclesiastical Province of Bohemia or Prague (after its Metropolitan see)

- Metropolitan Archdiocese of Prague
  - Diocese of České Budějovice
  - Diocese of Hradec Králové
  - Diocese of Litoměřice
  - Diocese of Plzeň

Ecclesiastical Province of Moravia or Olomouc (after its Metropolitan see)

- Metropolitan Archdiocese of Olomouc
  - Diocese of Brno
  - Diocese of Ostrava-Opava

=== Episcopal Conference of Greece ===
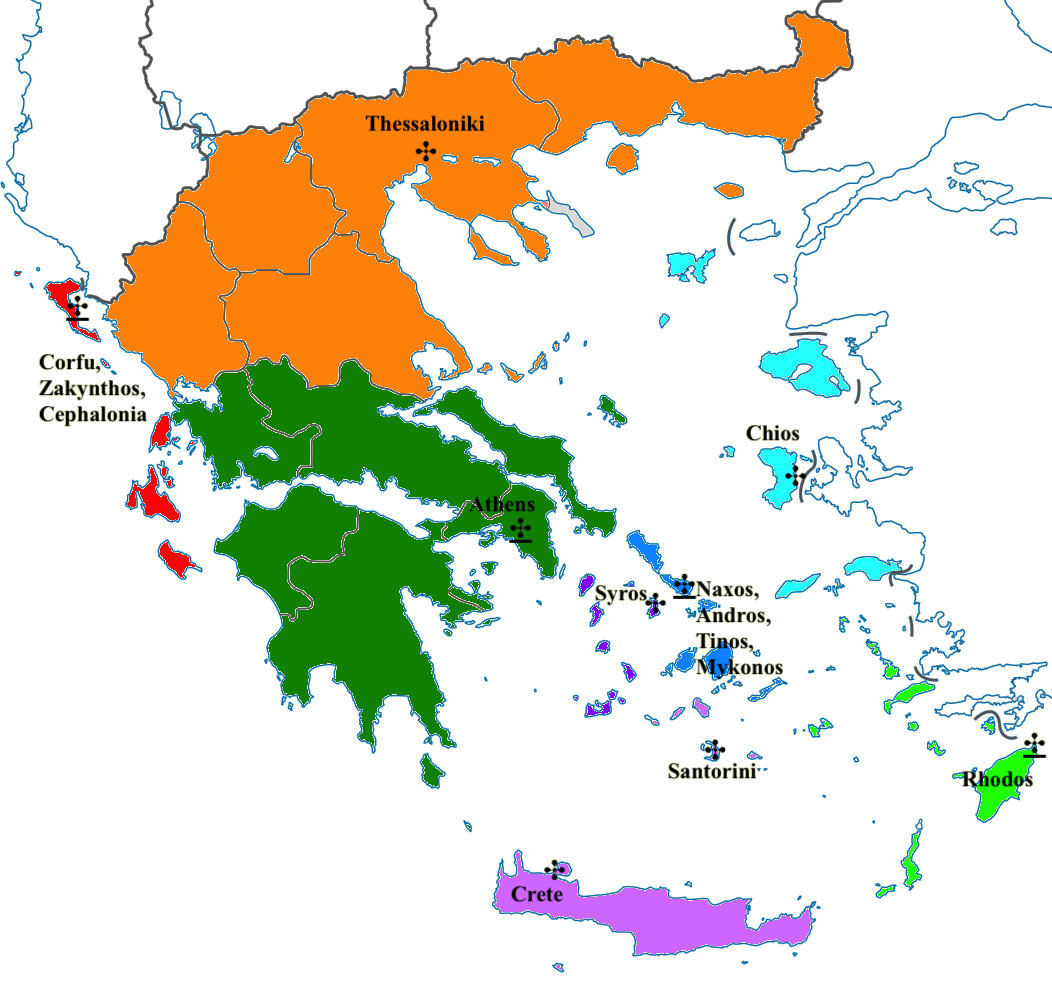
Catholic Dioceses in Greece

Exempt Latin (arch)dioceses, immediately depending from the Holy See

- Archdiocese of Athens (1875)
- Archdiocese of Rhodos (1928)
- Apostolic Vicariate of Thessaloniki

Exempt Eastern Catholic

- Armenian Catholic Ordinariate of Greece
- Greek Catholic Apostolic Exarchate of Greece, with cathedral see in Athens, for the Greek Catholic particular Eastern church

Ecclesiastical Province of Corfu, Zakynthos and Cephalonia (for Ionian islands)

- Archdiocese of Corfu, Zakynthos, and Cephalonia (nominal Metropolitan, no suffragan)

Ecclesiastical Province of Naxos, Andros, Tinos and Mykonos (for various Aegean islands)

- Metropolitan Archdiocese of Naxos, Andros, Tinos and Mykonos
  - Diocese of Chios
  - Diocese of Crete
  - Diocese of Santorini
  - Diocese of Syros and Milos

=== Episcopal Conference of Hungary (Latin and Eastern Churches) ===
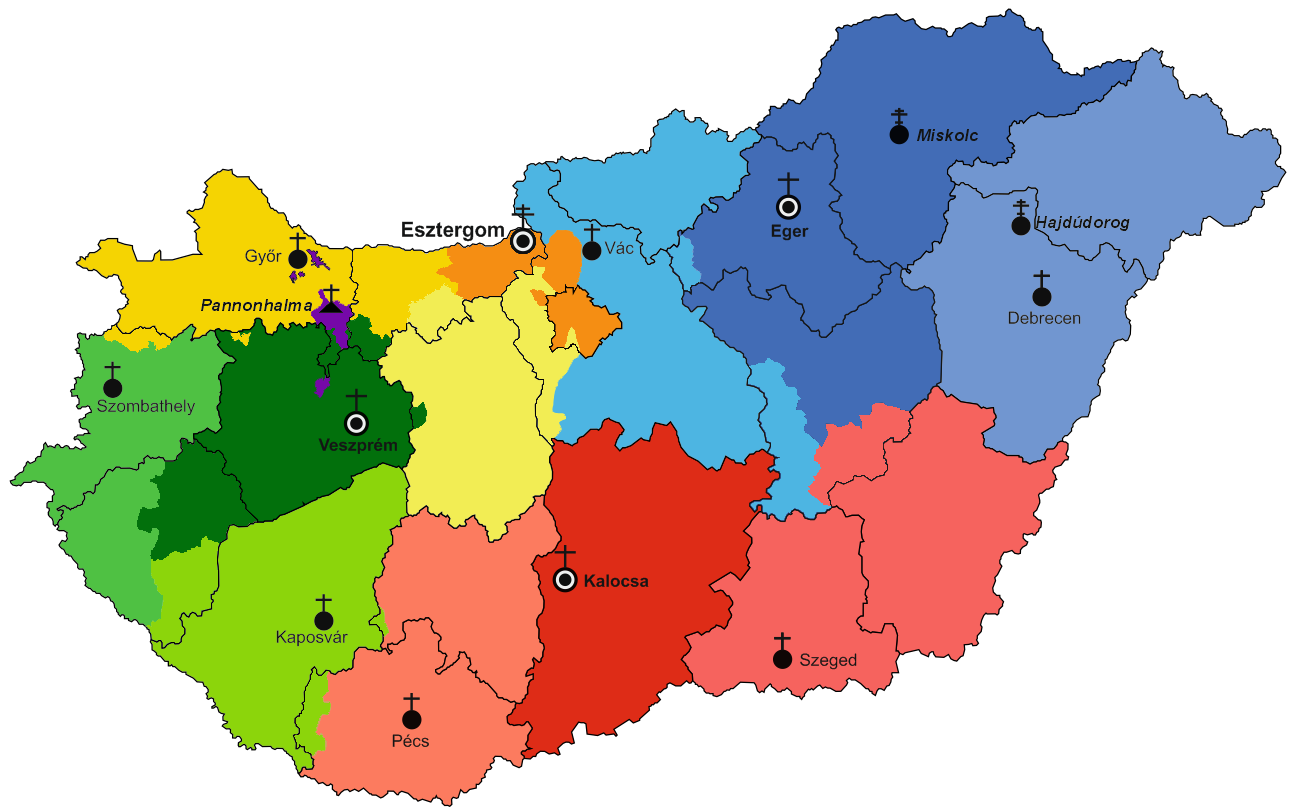
Map of the Catholic dioceses in Hungary

Exempt, i.e. immediately subject to the Holy See

- Military Ordinariate of Hungary, not vested in any see
- Territorial Abbacy of Pannonhalma, whose cathedral see is a minor basilica

Ecclesiastical Province of Eger

- Metropolitan Archdiocese of Eger
  - Diocese of Debrecen–Nyíregyháza
  - Diocese of Vác

Ecclesiastical Province of Esztergom-Budapest

- Metropolitan Archdiocese of Esztergom-Budapest
  - Diocese of Győr
  - Diocese of Székesfehérvár

Ecclesiastical Province of Kalocsa-Kecskemét

- Metropolitan Archdiocese of Kalocsa-Kecskemét
  - Diocese of Pécs
  - Diocese of Szeged–Csanád

Ecclesiastical Province of Veszprém

- Metropolitan Archdiocese of Veszprém
  - Diocese of Kaposvár
  - Diocese of Szombathely

Hungarian Catholic church Metropolitanate sui iuris

- Metropolitan Archeparchy of Hajdúdorog
  - Eparchy of Miskolc
  - Eparchy of Nyíregyháza

=== Episcopal Conference of Latvia ===
Ecclesiastical Province of Riga, covering Latvia

- Metropolitan Archdiocese of Riga
  - Diocese of Jelgava
  - Diocese of Liepāja
  - Diocese of Rēzekne–Aglona

=== Episcopal Conference of Lithuania ===
Exempt, i.e. immediately subject to the Holy See

- Military Ordinariate of Lithuania, not vested in any see

Ecclesiastical Province of Vilnius

- Metropolitan Archdiocese of Vilnius (1390)
  - Diocese of Kaišiadorys
  - Diocese of Panevėžys

Ecclesiastical Province of Kaunas

- Metropolitan Archdiocese of Kaunas
  - Diocese of Šiauliai
  - Diocese of Telšiai
  - Diocese of Vilkaviškis

=== Episcopal Conference of Poland ===
Exempt, i.e. directly subject to the Holy See

- Military Ordinariate of Poland
- Ordinariate for Eastern Catholics in Poland

Ecclesiastical province of Białystok

- Archdiocese of Białystok
  - Diocese of Drohiczyn
  - Diocese of Łomża

Ecclesiastical province of Częstochowa

- Archdiocese of Częstochowa
  - Diocese of Radom
  - Diocese of Sosnowiec

Ecclesiastical province of Gdańsk

- Archdiocese of Gdańsk
  - Diocese of Pelplin
  - Diocese of Toruń

Ecclesiastical province of Gniezno

- Archdiocese of Gniezno
  - Diocese of Bydgoszcz
  - Diocese of Włocławek

Ecclesiastical province of Katowice

- Archdiocese of Katowice
  - Diocese of Gliwice
  - Diocese of Opole

Ecclesiastical province of Kraków

- Archdiocese of Kraków
  - Diocese of Bielsko-Żywiec
  - Diocese of Kielce
  - Diocese of Tarnów

Ecclesiastical province of Łódź

- Archdiocese of Łódź
  - Diocese of Łowicz

Ecclesiastical province of Lublin

- Archdiocese of Lublin
  - Diocese of Sandomierz
  - Diocese of Siedlce

Ecclesiastical province of Poznań

- Archdiocese of Poznań
  - Diocese of Kalisz

Ecclesiastical province of Przemyśl

- Archdiocese of Przemyśl
  - Diocese of Rzeszów
  - Diocese of Zamość-Lubaczów

Ecclesiastical province of Szczecin-Kamień

- Archdiocese of Szczecin-Kamień
  - Diocese of Koszalin-Kołobrzeg
  - Diocese of Zielona Góra-Gorzów

Ecclesiastical province of Warmia

- Archdiocese of Warmia
  - Diocese of Elbląg
  - Diocese of Ełk

Ecclesiastical province of Warszawa

- Archdiocese of Warszawa
  - Diocese of Płock
  - Diocese of Warszawa-Praga

Ecclesiastical province of Wrocław

- Archdiocese of Wrocław
  - Diocese of Legnica
  - Diocese of Świdnica

Ukrainian Greek Catholic province of Przemyśl–Warszawa

- Metropolitan Ukrainian Catholic Archeparchy of Przemyśl–Warsaw
  - Ukrainian Catholic Eparchy of Olsztyn–Gdańsk
  - Ukrainian Catholic Eparchy of Wrocław-Koszalin

=== Episcopal Conference of Romania ===
Administrative map of the Latin and Armenian Catholic hierarchies in Romania

Exempt (immediately subject to Rome, no ecclesiastical province)

- Latin: Archdiocese of Alba Iulia/Gyulafehérvár
- Eastern Catholic: Armenian Catholic Ordinariate of Romania

Ecclesiastical Province of Bucharest (Latin)

- Metropolitan Archdiocese of Bucharest
  - Diocese of Iaşi
  - Diocese of Oradea Mare/Nagyvárad
  - Diocese of Satu Mare/Szatmár
  - Diocese of Timişoara/Temesvár

Eastern Catholic (Byzantine Rite) Major Archiepiscopal Romanian (Greek) Catholic Church's ecclesiastical (sole) province sui juris, covering Romania

- Romanian Greek Catholic Major Archeparchy of Făgăraș and Alba Iulia, the Major Archbishopric, with cathedral see at Blaj, Alba Julia
  - Romanian Catholic Eparchy of Oradea Mare
  - Romanian Catholic Eparchy of Cluj-Gherla
  - Romanian Catholic Eparchy of Lugos
  - Romanian Catholic Eparchy of Maramureș
  - Romanian Catholic Eparchy of Saint Basil the Great of Bucharest

=== Episcopal Conference of the Russian Federation ===
Exempt, i.e. directly subject to the Holy See

- Russian Catholic Apostolic Exarchate of Russia

Ecclesiastical Province of Moscow (partly in Asia- eastern Siberia)

- Archdiocese of Mother of God at Moscow, in Moscow
  - Diocese of Saint Clement at Saratov, at Saratov
  - Diocese of Transfiguration at Novosibirsk, in Novosibirsk (in western Siberia)
  - and an Asian diocese: Diocese of Saint Joseph at Irkutsk, at Irkutsk (in eastern Siberian Far East)

also includes, in Asia, one exempt diocese, immediately subject to the Holy See:

- Apostolic Prefecture of Yuzhno Sakhalinsk, on Sakhalin island off eastern Siberia

=== Episcopal Conference of Slovakia ===
Exempt, i.e. immediately subject to the Holy See

- Military Ordinariate of Slovakia, not vested in any see

Ecclesiastical Province of Bratislava (Latin)

- Metropolitan Archdiocese of Bratislava
  - Archdiocese of Trnava (not Metropolitan)
  - Diocese of Banská Bystrica
  - Diocese of Nitra
  - Diocese of Žilina

Ecclesiastical Province of Košice (Latin)

- Metropolitan Archdiocese of Košice
  - Diocese of Rožňava
  - Diocese of Spiš

Slovak Catholic Metropolitanate sui juris of Prešov (Eastern Catholic, Byzantine rite)

- Slovak Catholic Archeparchy of Prešov, the Metropolitan head of the particular church and its sole province's Metropolitan Archeparch (Archbishop), with suffragan Eparchies (bishoprics)
  - Slovak Catholic Eparchy of Bratislava
  - Slovak Catholic Eparchy of Košice

=== Episcopal Conference of Slovenia ===
Ecclesiastical Province of Ljubljana

- Metropolitan Archdiocese of Ljubljana
  - Diocese of Koper
  - Diocese of Novo Mesto

Ecclesiastical Province of Maribor

- Metropolitan Archdiocese of Maribor
  - Diocese of Celje
  - Diocese of Murska Sobota

Croatian Catholic Eparchy of Križevci, the Croatian proper diocese of the Byzantine rite Eastern Croatian Catholic Church, suffragan of the Metropolitan of Zagreb, also covers Catholics of Byzantine Rite in all of Slovenia and Bosnia and Herzegovina

=== Episcopal Conference of Ukraine ===
Roman Catholic Ecclesiastical province of Lviv, covering the Latin church in all Ukraine, including the Russian-annexed Crimea (Krym)

- Metropolitan Archdiocese of Lviv
  - Diocese of Kyiv-Zhytomyr
  - Diocese of Kamyanets-Podilskyi
  - Diocese of Lutsk
  - Diocese of Mukacheve
  - Diocese of Kharkiv-Zaporizhzhia
  - Diocese of Odesa-Simferopol

Armenian Catholic (Armenian rite)

- Armenian Catholic Archeparchy of Lviv, directly dependent on the Armenian Catholic Patriarchate of Cilicia

Ruthenian Catholic (Byzantine rite)

- Ruthenian Catholic Eparchy of Mukacheve, directly dependent to the Holy See. Is regarded as the maternal circumscription of the Ruthenian Catholic Church

Ukrainian Catholic (Byzantine rite) Metropolitanates

- Ukrainian Catholic Major Archeparchy of Kyiv–Halych, the Major Archeparchy and head of the particular church
  - Ukrainian Catholic Archeparchy of Kyiv, the proper Metropolitan Archeparchy, at Kyiv
  - Ukrainian Catholic Archiepiscopal Exarchate of Crimea (Krym), on the Russian-annexed Crimea, with cathedral see at Simferopol
  - Ukrainian Catholic Archiepiscopal Exarchate of Donetsk
  - Ukrainian Catholic Archiepiscopal Exarchate of Kharkiv
  - Ukrainian Catholic Archiepiscopal Exarchate of Lutsk
  - Ukrainian Catholic Archiepiscopal Exarchate of Odesa
- Ukrainian Catholic Archeparchy of Lviv (Metropolitan Archeparchy)
  - Ukrainian Catholic Eparchy of Stryi
  - Ukrainian Catholic Eparchy of Sambir–Drohobych
  - Ukrainian Catholic Eparchy of Sokal – Zhovkva
- Ukrainian Catholic Archeparchy of Ternopil – Zboriv (Metropolitan Archeparchy)
  - Ukrainian Catholic Eparchy of Buchach
  - Ukrainian Catholic Eparchy of Kamyanets-Podilskyi
- Ukrainian Catholic Archeparchy of Ivano-Frankivsk (Metropolitan Archeparchy)
  - Ukrainian Catholic Eparchy of Chernivtsi
  - Ukrainian Catholic Eparchy of Kolomyia

== North America (Latin and Eastern Churches) ==
=== Episcopal Conference of Canada ===
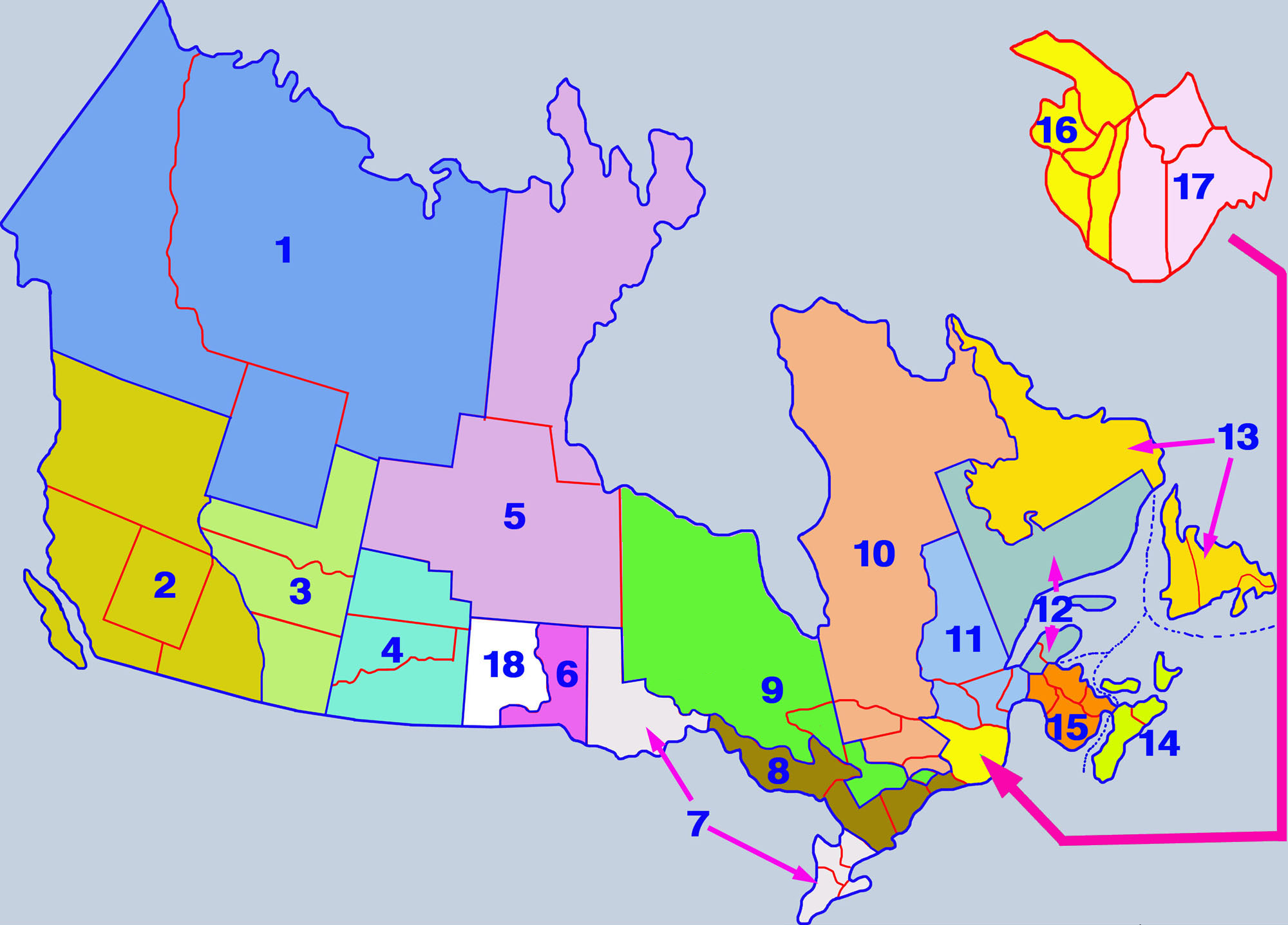
Map of Catholic dioceses in Canada

Exempt, i.e. immediately subject to the Holy See

- Military Ordinariate of Canada
- Archdiocese of Winnipeg (1915)

Ecclesiastical province of Edmonton, comprising most of the province of Alberta.

- Metropolitan Archdiocese of Edmonton (1871)
  - Diocese of Calgary (1912)
  - Diocese of Saint Paul, Alberta (1948)

Ecclesiastical province of Gatineau, comprising the western and northern parts of the province of Quebec.

- Metropolitan Archdiocese of Gatineau (1963)
  - Diocese of Amos (1938)
  - Diocese of Rouyn-Noranda (1973)

Ecclesiastical province of Grouard–McLennan, comprising the northernmost parts of the provinces of Alberta and British Columbia, as well as the Yukon and Northwest Territories.

- Metropolitan Archdiocese of Grouard-McLennan (1967)
  - Diocese of Mackenzie-Fort Smith (1967)
  - Diocese of Whitehorse (1967)

Ecclesiastical province of Halifax, comprising the provinces of Nova Scotia and Prince Edward Island.

- Metropolitan Archdiocese of Halifax-Yarmouth (1842)
  - Diocese of Antigonish (1844)
  - Diocese of Charlottetown (1829)

Ecclesiastical province of Keewatin-Le Pas, comprising the northern parts of the provinces of Saskatchewan, Manitoba, and Ontario, and the territory of Nunavut.

- Metropolitan Archdiocese of Keewatin–Le Pas (1967)
  - Diocese of Churchill-Hudson Bay (1967)

Ecclesiastical province of Kingston, comprising the central portions of the Canadian province of Ontario.

- Metropolitan Archdiocese of Kingston (1826)
  - Diocese of Peterborough (1882)
  - Diocese of Sault Sainte Marie (1904)

Ecclesiastical province of Moncton, comprising the province of New Brunswick.

- Metropolitan Archdiocese of Moncton (1936)
  - Diocese of Bathurst (in Canada) (1860)
  - Diocese of Edmundston (1944)
  - Diocese of Saint John, New Brunswick (1842)

Ecclesiastical province of Montréal, in Quebec, comprising the island of Montreal and surrounding areas to the north and south.

- Metropolitan Archdiocese of Montréal
  - Diocese of Joliette
  - Diocese of Saint-Jean-Longueuil
  - Diocese of Saint-Jérôme–Mont-Laurier (1951)
  - Diocese of Valleyfield

Ecclesiastical province of Ottawa, comprising the northeastern part of the province of Ontario and a small portion of Quebec.

- Metropolitan Archdiocese of Ottawa–Cornwall
  - Diocese of Hearst–Moosonee
  - Diocese of Pembroke
  - Diocese of Timmins

Ecclesiastical province of Québec, comprising only the central part of the province of Quebec, centering on the civil provincial capital Quebec City.

- Metropolitan Archdiocese of Québec (Quebec City) (1674)
  - Diocese of Chicoutimi
  - Diocese of Sainte-Anne-de-la-Pocatière
  - Diocese of Trois-Rivières

Ecclesiastical province of Regina, comprising the southern part of the province of Saskatchewan.

- Metropolitan Archdiocese of Regina
  - Diocese of Prince Albert
  - Diocese of Saskatoon

Ecclesiastical province of Rimouski, comprising the Gaspé Peninsula and the areas across the St. Lawrence River to the north, in the province of Quebec.

- Metropolitan Archdiocese of Rimouski
  - Diocese of Baie-Comeau
  - Diocese of Gaspé

Ecclesiastical province of Saint Boniface, comprising the southwest part of the province of Manitoba.

- Archdiocese of Saint Boniface (1847) (no suffragan)

Ecclesiastical province of St. John's, Newfoundland, comprising the province of Newfoundland and Labrador.

- Metropolitan Archdiocese of St. John's, Newfoundland
  - Diocese of Grand Falls
  - Diocese of Corner Brook and Labrador

Ecclesiastical province of Sherbrooke, comprising the part of the province of Quebec to the southeast of Montreal.

- Metropolitan Archdiocese of Sherbrooke
  - Diocese of Nicolet
  - Diocese of Saint-Hyacinthe

Ecclesiastical province of Toronto, comprising the southwest part of the province of Ontario, with the non-contiguous Diocese of Thunder Bay in western Ontario.

- Metropolitan Archdiocese of Toronto (1841)
  - Diocese of Hamilton, Ontario
  - Diocese of London, Ontario
  - Diocese of Saint Catharines
  - Diocese of Thunder Bay

Ecclesiastical province of Vancouver, comprising most of the province of British Columbia.

- Metropolitan Archdiocese of Vancouver
  - Diocese of Kamloops
  - Diocese of Nelson
  - Diocese of Prince George
  - Diocese of Victoria

Ukrainian Catholic province of Winnipeg

- Ukrainian Catholic Archeparchy of Winnipeg, Metropolitan Archdiocese of a Byzantine rite province in Canada
- Ukrainian Catholic Eparchy of Edmonton
- Ukrainian Catholic Eparchy of Toronto and Eastern Canada
- Ukrainian Catholic Eparchy of Saskatoon
- Ukrainian Catholic Eparchy of New Westminster

Other Eastern church dioceses in Canada, immediately subject to their particular churches

- Chaldean Catholic Eparchy of Mar Addai of Toronto, subject to the Patriarch of Babylon
- Maronite Diocese of Saint-Maron of Montréal, subject to the Maronite Catholic Patriarch of Antioch
- Melkite Greek Catholic Eparchy of Saint-Sauveur of Montréal, subject to the Melkite Catholic Patriarch of Antioch
- Exarchate of Saints Cyril and Methodius of Toronto, with cathedral see in Toronto, Ontario; territory Slovak Greek Catholics subject to the Ruthenian Greek Catholic Byzantine Catholic Archeparchy of Pittsburgh
- Syro-Malabar Catholic Eparchy of Mississauga, subject to the major archbishop of the syro malabar Major Archiépiscopal church in Kerala, India

See also USA for joint Armenian Catholic and Romanian Catholic dioceses and the personal ordinariate for former Anglicans

=== Episcopal Conference of Mexico ===
Ecclesiastical province of Acapulco

- Metropolitan Archdiocese of Acapulco (1958)
  - Diocese of Chilpancingo-Chilapa (1863)
  - Diocese of Ciudad Altamirano (1964)
  - Diocese of Tlapa

Ecclesiastical province of Tijuana (Baja California)

- Metropolitan Archdiocese of Tijuana
  - Diocese of Ensenada
  - Diocese of La Paz en la Baja California Sur
  - Diocese of Mexicali

Ecclesiastical province of Léon (Bajío)

- Metropolitan Archdiocese of León
  - Diocese of Celaya
  - Diocese of Irapuato
  - Diocese of Querétaro

Ecclesiastical province of Tuxtla Gutierrez (Chiapas)

- Metropolitan Archdiocese of Tuxtla Gutiérrez
  - Diocese of San Cristóbal de Las Casas
  - Diocese of Tapachula

Ecclesiastical province of Chihuahua

- Metropolitan Archdiocese of Chihuahua
  - Diocese of Ciudad Juárez
  - Diocese of Cuauhtémoc-Madera
  - Diocese of Nuevo Casas Grandes
  - Diocese of Parral
  - Diocese of Tarahumara

Ecclesiastical province of Durango

- Metropolitan Archdiocese of Durango
  - Diocese of Gómez Palacio
  - Diocese of Mazatlán
  - Diocese of Torreón
  - Territorial Prelature of El Salto

Ecclesiastical province of Guadalajara

- Metropolitan Archdiocese of Guadalajara
  - Diocese of Aguascalientes
  - Diocese of Autlán
  - Diocese of Ciudad Guzmán
  - Diocese of Colima
  - Diocese of San Juan de los Lagos
  - Diocese of Tepic
  - Territorial Prelature of Jesús María del Nayar

Ecclesiastical province of Hermosillo

- Metropolitan Archdiocese of Hermosillo
  - Diocese of Ciudad Obregón
  - Diocese of Culiacán
  - Diocese of Nogales

Ecclesiastical province of Tulancingo (Hidalgo)

- Metropolitan Archdiocese of Tulancingo
  - Diocese of Huejutla
  - Diocese of Tula

Ecclesiastical province of Jalapa (Xalapa)

- Metropolitan Archdiocese of Jalapa
  - Diocese of Coatzacoalcos
  - Diocese of Córdoba
  - Diocese of Orizaba
  - Diocese of Papantla
  - Diocese of San Andrés Tuxtla
  - Diocese of Tuxpan
  - Diocese of Veracruz

Ecclesiastical province of México

- Metropolitan Archdiocese of Mexico (1530)
  - Diocese of Azcapotzalco (2019)
  - Diocese of Iztapalapa (2019)
  - Diocese of Xochimilco (2019)

Ecclesiastical province of Monterrey

- Metropolitan Archdiocese of Monterrey
  - Diocese of Ciudad Victoria
  - Diocese of Linares
  - Diocese of Matamoros-Reynosa
  - Diocese of Nuevo Laredo
  - Diocese of Piedras Negras
  - Diocese of Saltillo
  - Diocese of Tampico

Ecclesiastical province of Morelia

- Metropolitan Archdiocese of Morelia
  - Diocese of Apatzingan
  - Diocese of Ciudad Lázaro Cárdenas
  - Diocese of Tacámbaro
  - Diocese of Zamora

Ecclesiastical province of (Antequera (de)) Oaxaca (Oaxaca)

- Metropolitan Archdiocese of (Antequera (de)) Oaxaca
  - Diocese of Puerto Escondido
  - Diocese of Tehuantepec
  - Diocese of Tuxtepec
  - Territorial Prelature of Huautla
  - Territorial Prelature of Mixes

Ecclesiastical province of Puebla (de los Angeles)

- Metropolitan Archdiocese of Puebla
  - Diocese of Huajuapan de León
  - Diocese of Tehuacán
  - Diocese of Tlaxcala

Ecclesiastical province of San Luis Potosí

- Metropolitan Archdiocese of San Luis Potosí
  - Diocese of Ciudad Valles
  - Diocese of Matehuala
  - Diocese of Zacatecas

Ecclesiastical province of Tlalnepantla

- Metropolitan Archdiocese of Tlalnepantla
  - Diocese of Cuautitlán
  - Diocese of Ecatepec
  - Diocese of Izcalli
  - Diocese of Netzahualcóyotl
  - Diocese of Teotihuacan
  - Diocese of Texcoco
  - Diocese of Valle de Chalco

Ecclesiastical province of Toluca

- Metropolitan Archdiocese of Toluca
  - Diocese of Atlacomulco
  - Diocese of Cuernavaca
  - Diocese of Tenancingo

Ecclesiastical province of Yucatán

- Metropolitan Archdiocese of Yucatán
  - Diocese of Campeche
  - Diocese of Tabasco
  - Diocese of Cancún-Chetumal

=== Episcopal Conference of Costa Rica ===
Ecclesiastical province of San José de Costa Rica

- Metropolitan Archdiocese of San José de Costa Rica (1850)
  - Diocese of Alajuela
  - Diocese of Cartago
  - Diocese of Ciudad Quesada
  - Diocese of Limón
  - Diocese of Puntarenas
  - Diocese of San Isidro de El General
  - Diocese of Tilarán-Liberia

=== Episcopal Conference of El Salvador ===
Exempt military ordinariate, immediately subject to the Holy See,

- Military Ordinariate of El Salvador

Ecclesiastical province of San Salvador, covering El Salvador

- Metropolitan Archdiocese of San Salvador (1842)
  - Diocese of Chalatenango
  - Diocese of San Miguel
  - Diocese of San Vicente
  - Diocese of Santa Ana
  - Diocese of Santiago de María
  - Diocese of Sonsonate
  - Diocese of Zacatecoluca

=== Episcopal Conference of Guatemala ===
Exempt dioceses, immediately subject to the Holy See

- Apostolic Vicariate of El Petén
- Apostolic Vicariate of Izabal

Ecclesiastical province of Santiago de Guatemala

- Metropolitan Archdiocese of Santiago de Guatemala (1534), in Ciudad de Guatemala
  - Diocese of Escuintla
  - Diocese of Jalapa
  - Diocese of San Francisco de Asís de Jutiapa
  - Diocese of Santa Rosa de Lima
  - Diocese of Verapaz, Cobán (1935)
  - Diocese of Zacapa y Santo Cristo de Esquipulas

Ecclesiastical province of Los Altos Quetzaltenango-Totonicapán

- Metropolitan Archdiocese of Los Altos Quetzaltenango-Totonicapán (1921)
  - Diocese of Huehuetenango
  - Diocese of Quiché
  - Diocese of San Marcos
  - Diocese of Sololá-Chimaltenango
  - Diocese of Suchitepéquez-Retalhuleu

=== Episcopal Conference of Honduras ===
Ecclesiastical province of Tegucigalpa, covering central and southern Honduras

- Metropolitan Archdiocese of Tegucigalpa
  - Diocese of Choluteca
  - Diocese of Comayagua
  - Diocese of Danlí
  - Diocese of Juticalpa

Ecclesiastical province of San Pedro Sula, covering northern and western Honduras

- Metropolitan Archdiocese of San Pedro Sula
  - Diocese of Gracias
  - Diocese of La Ceiba
  - Diocese of Santa Rosa de Copán
  - Diocese of Trujillo
  - Diocese of Yoro

=== Episcopal Conference of Nicaragua ===
Ecclesiastical province of Managua, covering Nicaragua

- Metropolitan Archdiocese of Managua
  - Diocese of Bluefields
  - Diocese of Estelí
  - Diocese of Granada
  - Diocese of Jinotega
  - Diocese of Juigalpa
  - Diocese of León in Nicaragua
  - Diocese of Matagalpa
  - Diocese of Siuna

=== Episcopal Conference of Panama ===
Exempt diocese, immediately subject to the Holy See

- Apostolic Vicariate of Darién

Ecclesiastical province of Panamá, covering Panama

- Metropolitan Archdiocese of Panamá (1513)
  - Diocese of Chitré
  - Diocese of Colón-Kuna Yala
  - Diocese of David
  - Diocese of Penonomé
  - Diocese of Santiago de Veraguas
  - Territorial Prelature of Bocas del Toro

=== Episcopal Conference of the (Lesser) Antilles (and Belize and Guyanas) ===
the Diocese of Saint-Thomas, with see in Charlotte Amalie, on St. Thomas, on and for the U.S. Virgin Islands, is a suffragan of the mainland-North American Metropolitan Archdiocese of Washington (D.C.)

Ecclesiastical province of Castries - comprising several current and former British colonies in the Lesser Antilles.

- Metropolitan Archdiocese of Castries (1956), with see at Castries on Saint Lucia
  - Diocese of Kingstown (1989), on and for Saint Vincent and Grenadines
  - Diocese of Roseau (1850), with see at Roseau on Dominica
  - Diocese of Saint George's in Grenada (1956), with see on Grenada
  - Diocese of Saint John's - Basseterre (1971), with see at Saint John on Antigua and Barbuda, also for Anguilla, the British Virgin Islands, Montserrat and Saint Kitts and Nevis

Ecclesiastical province of Fort-de-France - comprising the French territories in the Caribbean.

- Metropolitan Archdiocese of Fort-de-France (1850), on and for Martinique
  - Diocese of Basse-Terre(-Pointe-à-Pitre) (1850), on Guadeloupe, also for Saint-Barthélemy and Saint-Martin
  - Diocese of Cayenne (Cajenna) (1956), in and for French Guiana (in South America)

Ecclesiastical province of Kingston in (and covering) Jamaica, also comprising several other former and current British colonies in the Western Caribbean.

- Metropolitan Archdiocese of Kingston in Jamaica (1956), on Jamaica
  - Diocese of Mandeville (1997), also on Jamaica
  - Diocese of Montego Bay (1967), also on Jamaica
  - Mission Sui Iuris of Cayman Islands, on and for the Cayman Islands
  - Diocese of Belize City-Belmopan (1956), in and for Belize (in Central America, formerly British Honduras)

Ecclesiastical province of Nassau - comprising several current and former British territories to the north of the Caribbean.

- Metropolitan Archdiocese of Nassau (1960) on the Bahamas
  - Diocese of Hamilton (in Bermuda) (1967), on Bermuda
  - Mission Sui Iuris of Turks and Caicos, on and for the Turks and Caicos Islands

Ecclesiastical province of Port of Spain - comprising several former British or Dutch colonies in the southeastern Caribbean and northern South America.

- Metropolitan Archdiocese of Port of Spain (1850), on and for Trinidad and Tobago
  - Diocese of Bridgetown (1970), on and for Barbados
  - Diocese of Willemstad (1958), on Curaçao in the Netherlands Antilles, also for Aruba, Bonaire, Saba, Sint Eustatius and Sint Maarten
  - Diocese of Georgetown (1956), in Guyana (in South America, formerly British)
  - Diocese of Paramaribo (1958), in Suriname (in South America, formerly Dutch Guyana)

=== Episcopal Conference of Cuba ===
Ecclesiastical province of (San Cristóbal de) la Habana

- Metropolitan Archdiocese of (San Cristóbal de) la Habana (1787), at La Havana
  - Diocese of Matanzas (1912)
  - Diocese of Pinar del Río (1903)

Ecclesiastical province of Camagüey

- Metropolitan Archdiocese of Camagüey (1912)
  - Diocese of Ciego de Avila (1996)
  - Diocese of Cienfuegos (1903)
  - Diocese of Santa Clara (1995)

Ecclesiastical province of Santiago de Cuba

- Metropolitan Archdiocese of Santiago de Cuba (1518)
  - Diocese of Guantánamo-Baracoa (1998)
  - Diocese of Holguín (1979)
  - Diocese of Santísimo Salvador de Bayamo y Manzanillo (1995)

=== Episcopal Conference of the Dominican Republic ===
exempt, i.e. immediately subject to the Holy See, but often held by the capital's archbishop

- Military Ordinariate of Dominican Republic

Ecclesiastical province of Santo Domingo

- Metropolitan Archdiocese of Santo Domingo (1511), primatial see of America
  - Diocese of Baní
  - Diocese of Barahona
  - Diocese of Nuestra Señora de la Altagracia en Higüey
  - Diocese of San Juan de la Maguana
  - Diocese of San Pedro de Macorís
  - Diocese of Stella Maris

Ecclesiastical province of Santiago de los Caballeros

- Metropolitan Archdiocese of Santiago de los Caballeros
  - Diocese of La Vega
  - Diocese of Mao-Monte Cristi
  - Diocese of Puerto Plata
  - Diocese of San Francisco de Macorís

=== Episcopal Conference of Haiti ===
Ecclesiastical province of Cap-Haïtien

- Metropolitan Archdiocese of Cap-Haïtien
  - Diocese of Fort-Liberté
  - Diocese of Hinche
  - Diocese of Les Gonaïves
  - Diocese of Port-de-Paix

Ecclesiastical province of Port-au-Prince

- Metropolitan Archdiocese of Port-au-Prince
  - Diocese of Anse-à-Veau and Miragoâne
  - Diocese of Jacmel
  - Diocese of Jérémie
  - Diocese of Les Cayes

=== Episcopal Conference of Puerto Rico ===
Ecclesiastical province of San Juan de Puerto Rico, covering the Commonwealth of Puerto Rico

- Metropolitan Archdiocese of San Juan de Puerto Rico (1511)
  - Diocese of Arecibo
  - Diocese of Caguas
  - Diocese of Fajardo-Humacao
  - Diocese of Mayagüez
  - Diocese of Ponce

=== Episcopal Conference of the United States of America ===
Exempt, immediately subject to the holy See and not part of a Bishops' Region

- Military Ordinariate of Archdiocese for the Military Services of the United States
- Personal Ordinariate of the Chair of St. Peter (former Anglicans)

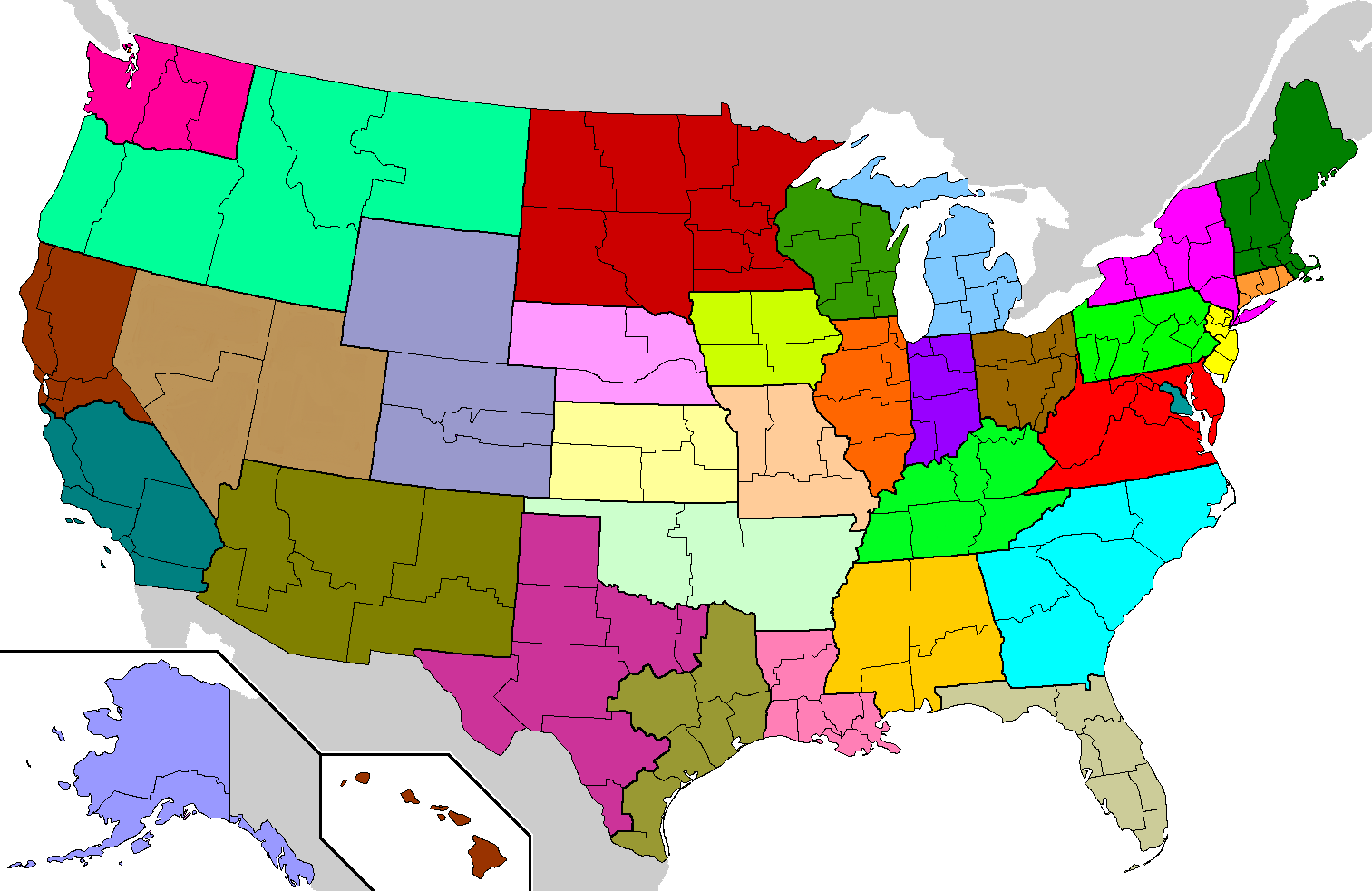
Provinces and dioceses of the Latin Church in the United States. Each color represents one of the 32 Latin-rite provinces. Not depicted are the U.S. Virgin Islands, which constitute the Diocese of St. Thomas, the sole suffragan diocese in the province of Washington, D.C.

Note: The United States Conference of Catholic Bishops (USCCB) divides the non-exempt dioceses of the United States (including Alaska, Hawaii, and the U.S. Virgin Islands) into fourteen geographical regions—termed "Bishops' Regions" for the Latin Church provinces—and a fifteenth "region" that consists of the Eastern Catholic eparchies. These regions are not the canonical "ecclesiastical regions" described in canon 433 and 434, but are operated by an elected regional chairman. However, the Ordinaries of Personal Ordinariates established under the auspices of Anglicanorum Coetibus are members of their respective Bishops’ Conferences, and the USCCB lists the exempt Personal Ordinariate of the Chair of St. Peter as a part of Bishops’ Region X.

Bishops' Region I
Ecclesiastical province of Boston, comprising the states of Maine, Massachusetts, New Hampshire and Vermont.

- Metropolitan Archdiocese of Boston (1808)
  - Diocese of Burlington (1853)
  - Diocese of Fall River (1904)
  - Diocese of Manchester (1884)
  - Diocese of Portland (1853)
  - Diocese of Springfield in Massachusetts (1870)
  - Diocese of Worcester (1950)

Ecclesiastical province of Hartford, comprising the states of Connecticut and Rhode Island, as well as Fishers Island in the state of New York.

- Metropolitan Archdiocese of Hartford (1843)
  - Diocese of Bridgeport (1953)
  - Diocese of Norwich (1953)
  - Diocese of Providence (1872)

Bishops' Region II
Ecclesiastical province of New York, comprising the state of New York except for Fishers Island.

- Metropolitan Archdiocese of New York (1808)
  - Diocese of Albany (1847)
  - Diocese of Brooklyn (1853)
  - Diocese of Buffalo (1847)
  - Diocese of Ogdensburg (1872)
  - Diocese of Rochester (1868)
  - Diocese of Rockville Centre (1957)
  - Diocese of Syracuse (1886)

Bishops' Region III
Ecclesiastical province of Newark, comprising the state of New Jersey.

- Metropolitan Archdiocese of Newark (1853)
  - Diocese of Camden (1937)
  - Diocese of Metuchen (1981)
  - Diocese of Paterson (1937)
  - Diocese of Trenton (1881)

Ecclesiastical province of Philadelphia, comprising the state of Pennsylvania.

- Metropolitan Archdiocese of Philadelphia (1808)
  - Diocese of Allentown (1961)
  - Diocese of Altoona-Johnstown
  - Diocese of Erie
  - Diocese of Greensburg
  - Diocese of Harrisburg (1868)
  - Diocese of Pittsburgh
  - Diocese of Scranton (1868)

Bishops' Region IV
Ecclesiastical province of Baltimore, comprising most of the state of Maryland as well as the states of Delaware, Virginia and West Virginia.

- Metropolitan Archdiocese of Baltimore (1789)
  - Diocese of Arlington
  - Diocese of Richmond (1820)
  - Diocese of Wheeling-Charleston (1850)
  - Diocese of Wilmington (1868)

Ecclesiastical province of Washington, comprising the District of Columbia, 5 counties in southern Maryland, and the United States Virgin Islands.

- Metropolitan Archdiocese of Washington (1939)
  - Diocese of Saint Thomas, with see in Charlotte Amalie, U.S. Virgin Islands (the bishops of the diocese are members of the USCCB and have observer status in the Antilles Episcopal Conference)

Bishops' Region V
Ecclesiastical province of Louisville, comprising the states of Kentucky and Tennessee.

- Metropolitan Archdiocese of Louisville (1808)
  - Diocese of Covington
  - Diocese of Knoxville
  - Diocese of Lexington
  - Diocese of Memphis
  - Diocese of Nashville
  - Diocese of Owensboro

Ecclesiastical province of Mobile, comprising the states of Alabama and Mississippi.

- Metropolitan Archdiocese of Mobile (1829)
  - Diocese of Biloxi
  - Diocese of Birmingham in Alabama
  - Diocese of Jackson

Ecclesiastical province of New Orleans, comprising the state of Louisiana.

- Metropolitan Archdiocese of New Orleans (1793)
  - Diocese of Alexandria in Louisiana
  - Diocese of Baton Rouge
  - Diocese of Houma-Thibodaux
  - Diocese of Lafayette in Louisiana
  - Diocese of Lake Charles
  - Diocese of Shreveport

Bishops' Region VI
Ecclesiastical province of Cincinnati, comprising the state of Ohio.

- Metropolitan Archdiocese of Cincinnati (1821)
  - Diocese of Cleveland (1847)
  - Diocese of Columbus (1868)
  - Diocese of Steubenville
  - Diocese of Toledo
  - Diocese of Youngstown

Ecclesiastical province of Detroit, comprising the state of Michigan.

- Metropolitan Archdiocese of Detroit (1833)
  - Diocese of Gaylord
  - Diocese of Grand Rapids
  - Diocese of Kalamazoo
  - Diocese of Lansing
  - Diocese of Marquette
  - Diocese of Saginaw

Bishops' Region VII
Ecclesiastical province of Chicago, comprising the state of Illinois.

- Metropolitan Archdiocese of Chicago (1843)
  - Diocese of Belleville
  - Diocese of Joliet in Illinois
  - Diocese of Peoria (1877)
  - Diocese of Rockford
  - Diocese of Springfield in Illinois

Ecclesiastical province of Indianapolis, comprising the state of Indiana.

- Metropolitan Archdiocese of Indianapolis (1834)
  - Diocese of Evansville
  - Diocese of Fort Wayne-South Bend
  - Diocese of Gary
  - Diocese of Lafayette in Indiana

Ecclesiastical province of Milwaukee, comprising the state of Wisconsin.

- Metropolitan Archdiocese of Milwaukee (1843)
  - Diocese of Green Bay
  - Diocese of La Crosse
  - Diocese of Madison
  - Diocese of Superior

Bishops' Region VIII
Ecclesiastical province of Saint Paul and Minneapolis, comprising the states of Minnesota, North Dakota and South Dakota.

- Metropolitan Archdiocese of Saint Paul and Minneapolis (1850)
  - Diocese of Bismarck
  - Diocese of Crookston
  - Diocese of Duluth
  - Diocese of Fargo
  - Diocese of New Ulm
  - Diocese of Rapid City
  - Diocese of Saint Cloud
  - Diocese of Sioux Falls
  - Diocese of Winona-Rochester

Bishops' Region IX
Ecclesiastical province of Dubuque, comprising the state of Iowa.

- Metropolitan Archdiocese of Dubuque (1837)
  - Diocese of Davenport
  - Diocese of Des Moines
  - Diocese of Sioux City

Ecclesiastical province of Kansas City, comprising the state of Kansas.

- Metropolitan Archdiocese of Kansas City in Kansas (1877)
  - Diocese of Dodge City
  - Diocese of Salina
  - Diocese of Wichita

Ecclesiastical province of Omaha, comprising the state of Nebraska.

- Metropolitan Archdiocese of Omaha (1888)
  - Diocese of Grand Island
  - Diocese of Lincoln

Ecclesiastical province of Saint Louis, comprising the state of Missouri.

- Metropolitan Archdiocese of St. Louis (1826)
  - Diocese of Jefferson City
  - Diocese of Kansas City-Saint Joseph
  - Diocese of Springfield-Cape Girardeau

Bishops' Region X
Ecclesiastical province of Galveston–Houston, comprising the east and southeast parts of the state of Texas.

- Metropolitan Archdiocese of Galveston–Houston (1847)
  - Diocese of Austin
  - Diocese of Beaumont
  - Diocese of Brownsville
  - Diocese of Corpus Christi
  - Diocese of Tyler
  - Diocese of Victoria in Texas

Ecclesiastical province of San Antonio, comprising the west and north of the state of Texas.

- Metropolitan Archdiocese of San Antonio (1874)
  - Diocese of Amarillo
  - Diocese of Dallas
  - Diocese of El Paso
  - Diocese of Fort Worth
  - Diocese of Laredo
  - Diocese of Lubbock
  - Diocese of San Angelo

Ecclesiastical province of Oklahoma City, comprising the states of Arkansas and Oklahoma.

- Metropolitan Archdiocese of Oklahoma City (1905)
  - Diocese of Little Rock
  - Diocese of Tulsa (1972)

Personal Ordinariate of the Chair of St. Peter, comprising former Anglicans throughout the United States (and Canada).

- Personal Ordinariate of the Chair of St. Peter

Bishops' Region XI
Ecclesiastical province of Los Angeles, comprising the southern part of the state of California.

- Metropolitan Archdiocese of Los Angeles (1840)
  - Diocese of Fresno
  - Diocese of Monterey in California
  - Diocese of Orange (county, L.A.) (1976)
  - Diocese of San Bernardino (1978)
  - Diocese of San Diego

Ecclesiastical province of San Francisco, comprising the northern part of the state of California and the state of Hawaii (in Oceania).

- Metropolitan Archdiocese of San Francisco (1853)
  - Diocese of Oakland
  - Diocese of Sacramento
  - Diocese of San Jose in California
  - Diocese of Santa Rosa in California
  - Diocese of Stockton
  - also Diocese of Honolulu, in Polynesia, i.e. in Oceania

Bishops' Region XII
Ecclesiastical province of Anchorage-Juneau, comprising the state of Alaska.

- Metropolitan Archdiocese of Anchorage-Juneau (1951)
  - Diocese of Fairbanks (1962)

Ecclesiastical province of Portland in Oregon, comprising the states of Idaho, Montana and Oregon, except for the parts of Yellowstone National Park in the states of Idaho and Montana.

- Metropolitan Archdiocese of Portland in Oregon (1846)
  - Diocese of Baker
  - Diocese of Boise
  - Diocese of Great Falls-Billings
  - Diocese of Helena

Ecclesiastical province of Seattle, comprising the state of Washington

- Metropolitan Archdiocese of Seattle (1850)
  - Diocese of Spokane (1913)
  - Diocese of Yakima (1951)

Bishops' Region XIII
Ecclesiastical province of Denver, comprising the states of Colorado and Wyoming, as well as the parts of Yellowstone National Park in the states of Idaho and Montana.

- Metropolitan Archdiocese of Denver (1887)
  - Diocese of Cheyenne
  - Diocese of Colorado Springs
  - Diocese of Pueblo

Ecclesiastical province of Santa Fe, comprising the states of Arizona and New Mexico.

- Archdiocese of Santa Fe (1853)
  - Diocese of Gallup
  - Diocese of Las Cruces
  - Diocese of Phoenix
  - Diocese of Tucson

Ecclesiastical province of Las Vegas, comprising the states of Nevada and Utah.

- Metropolitan Archdiocese of Las Vegas (1995)
  - Diocese of Reno (1931)
  - Diocese of Salt Lake City

Bishops' Region XIV
Ecclesiastical province of Miami, comprising the state of Florida.

- Metropolitan Archdiocese of Miami (1958)
  - Diocese of Orlando (1968)
  - Diocese of Palm Beach
  - Diocese of Pensacola-Tallahassee
  - Diocese of St. Augustine (1870)
  - Diocese of Saint Petersburg (1968)
  - Diocese of Venice in Florida

Ecclesiastical province of Atlanta, comprising the states of Georgia, North Carolina, and South Carolina.

- Metropolitan Archdiocese of Atlanta (1956)
  - Diocese of Charleston (1820)
  - Diocese of Charlotte
  - Diocese of Raleigh
  - Diocese of Savannah (1850)

Bishops' Region XV

This is not a geographical region and it does not consist of ecclesiastical provinces. Instead, it consists exclusively of US branches of various, generally Europe- or Asia-based, particular Eastern Catholic Churches. See the Eastern Catholic Churches section (below) for their particular hierarchies.

Antiochian rites
Maronite Church

- Eparchy of Brooklyn (NYC, New York)
- Eparchy of Our Lady of Lebanon (St. Louis, Missouri)

Syriac Catholic Church

- Syriac Catholic Eparchy of Our Lady of Deliverance of Newark

Syro-Malankara Catholic Church

- Syro-Malankara Catholic Eparchy of St. Mary, Queen of Peace, of the United States of America and Canada

Armenian rite
Armenian Catholic Church

- Armenian Catholic Eparchy of Our Lady of Nareg in the United States of America and Canada

Byzantine (Constantinopolitan) rites
Melkite Greek Catholic Church

- Eparchy of Newton

Romanian Catholic Church

- Eparchy of St. George's in Canton for Romanians

Ruthenian Greek Catholic Church (only sui iuris Church headquartered in the Americas)

Ecclesiastical province of the Ruthenian Catholic Metropolitan Church of Pittsburgh

- Metropolitan Archeparchy of Pittsburgh
  - Eparchy of Parma
  - Eparchy of Passaic
  - Holy Protection of Mary Eparchy of Phoenix

Ukrainian Greek Catholic Church

Ecclesiastical Province of Philadelphia

- Metropolitan Archeparchy of Philadelphia
  - Eparchy of Saint Nicholas in Chicago for Ukrainians
  - Eparchy of Saint Josaphat in Parma
  - Eparchy of Stamford

Syro-Oriental Rites
Chaldean Catholic Church

- Eparchy of St. Peter the Apostle of San Diego
- Eparchy of St. Thomas the Apostle of Detroit

Syro-Malabar Catholic Church

- St. Thomas Syro-Malabar Catholic Diocese of Chicago

== South America (Latin and Eastern Churches) ==
Exempt diocese, directly subject to the Holy See

- Apostolic Prefecture of Falkland Islands (Malvinas), for Falkland Islands (Malvinas) and South Georgia and the South Sandwich Islands (southern Atlantic UK overseas territories); part of the Episcopal Conference of England and Wales

=== Episcopal Conference of Argentina ===
(Latin and Eastern Churches)

exempt, immediately subject to the Holy See

- Military Ordinariate of Argentina
- Melkite Apostolic Exarchate of Argentina, a Byzantine rite, with cathedral see San Jorge in Cordoba
- Armenian Catholic Eparchy of San Gregorio de Narek in Buenos Aires, with cathedral see in Buenos Aires, Armenian Rite; presently vested in the Armenian Apostolic Exarchate of Latin America and Mexico
- Ordinariate for Eastern Catholics in Argentina, for all other Eastern particular churches (Byzantine and other rites), vested in the Latin Church Metropolitan Archbishop of capital Buenos Aires

Ecclesiastical province of Bahía Blanca

- Metropolitan Archdiocese of Bahía Blanca (1934)
  - Diocese of Alto Valle del Río Negro
  - Diocese of Comodoro Rivadavia
  - Diocese of Río Gallegos
  - Diocese of San Carlos de Bariloche
  - Diocese of Santa Rosa
  - Diocese of Viedma
  - Territorial Prelature of Esquel

Ecclesiastical province of Buenos Aires

- Metropolitan Archdiocese of Buenos Aires (1620)
  - Diocese of Avellaneda-Lanús
  - Diocese of Gregorio de Laferrère
  - Diocese of Lomas de Zamora
  - Diocese of Morón
  - Diocese of Quilmes
  - Diocese of San Isidro
  - Diocese of San Justo
  - Diocese of San Martín
  - Diocese of San Miguel
  - Maronite Catholic Eparchy of San Charbel in Buenos Aires, an Antiochene Rite eparchy (diocese)
  - Ukrainian Catholic Eparchy of Santa María del Patrocinio in Buenos Aires, Ukrainian Catholic eparchy for the Byzantine Rite Ukrainian Catholic Church in all Argentina, with cathedral see in Buenos Aires

Ecclesiastical province of Córdoba

- Metropolitan Archdiocese of Córdoba (1570)
  - Diocese of Cruz del Eje
  - Diocese of Villa de la Concepción del Río Cuarto
  - Diocese of San Francisco
  - Diocese of Villa María
  - Territorial Prelature of Deán Funes

Ecclesiastical province of Corrientes

- Metropolitan Archdiocese of Corrientes (1910)
  - Diocese of Goya
  - Diocese of Oberá
  - Diocese of Posadas
  - Diocese of Puerto Iguazú
  - Diocese of Santo Tomé

Ecclesiastical province of La Plata

- Metropolitan Archdiocese of La Plata (1897)
  - Diocese of Azul (1934)
  - Diocese of Chascomús
  - Diocese of Mar del Plata

Ecclesiastical province of Mendoza

- Metropolitan Archdiocese of Mendoza (1934)
  - Diocese of Neuquén
  - Diocese of San Rafael

Ecclesiastical province of Mercedes-Luján

- Archdiocese of Mercedes-Luján (1934)
  - Diocese of Merlo-Moreno
  - Diocese of Nueve de Julio
  - Diocese of Zárate-Campana

Ecclesiastical province of Paraná

- Metropolitan Archdiocese of Paraná (1859)
  - Diocese of Concordia
  - Diocese of Gualeguaychú

Ecclesiastical province of Resistencia

- Metropolitan Archdiocese of Resistencia
  - Diocese of Formosa
  - Diocese of San Roque de Presidencia Roque Sáenz Peña

Ecclesiastical province of Rosario

- Metropolitan Archdiocese of Rosario
  - Diocese of San Nicolás de los Arroyos (1947)
  - Diocese of Venado Tuerto

Ecclesiastical province of Salta

- Metropolitan Archdiocese of Salta (1806)
  - Diocese of Catamarca
  - Diocese of Jujuy
  - Diocese of Oran
  - Territorial Prelature of Cafayate
  - Territorial Prelature of Humahuaca

Ecclesiastical province of San Juan

- Metropolitan Archdiocese of San Juan de Cuyo (1834)
  - Diocese of La Rioja
  - Diocese of San Luis

Ecclesiastical province of Santa Fe

- Metropolitan Archdiocese of Santa Fe de la Vera Cruz (1897)
  - Diocese of Rafaela
  - Diocese of Reconquista

Ecclesiastical province of Tucumán

- Metropolitan Archdiocese of Tucumán (1897)
  - Diocese of Añatuya
  - Diocese of Concepción
  - Archdiocese of Santiago del Estero

=== Episcopal Conference of Bolivia ===
exempt, immediately subject to the Holy See

- Military Ordinariate of Bolivia
- Apostolic Vicariate of Camiri
- Apostolic Vicariate of El Beni
- Apostolic Vicariate of Ñuflo de Chávez
- Apostolic Vicariate of Pando
- Apostolic Vicariate of Reyes

Ecclesiastical province of Cochabamba

- Metropolitan Archdiocese of Cochabamba
  - Diocese of Oruro
  - Territorial Prelature of Aiquille

Ecclesiastical province of La Paz

- Metropolitan Archdiocese of La Paz (1605)
  - Diocese of Coroico
  - Diocese of El Alto
  - Territorial Prelature of Corocoro

Ecclesiastical province of Santa Cruz de la Sierra

- Metropolitan Archdiocese of Santa Cruz de la Sierra
  - Diocese of San Ignacio de Velasco

Ecclesiastical province of Sucre

- Metropolitan Archdiocese of Sucre (1552)
  - Diocese of Potosí
  - Diocese of Tarija

=== Episcopal Conference of Brazil ===
Catholic Ecclesiastical provinces of Brazil

Exempt, i.e. immediately subject to the Holy See

- Military Ordinariate of Brazil
- Personal Apostolic Administration of São João Maria Vianney, with cathedral see Igreja Principal do Imaculado Coração de Nossa Senhora do Rosário de Fátima, in Campos dos Goytacazes
- Armenian Catholic Apostolic Exarchate of Latin America and Mexico, with cathedral see in São Paulo; also covering Mexico and Uruguay (with co-cathedral in Montevideo)
- Ordinariate for Eastern Catholics in Brazil, for Eastern Catholics of all rites without proper see; cumulated with varying Latin Church Metropolitan sees

Ecclesiastical province of Aparecida

- Metropolitan Archdiocese of Aparecida
  - Diocese of Caraguatatuba
  - Diocese of Lorena
  - Diocese of São José dos Campos
  - Diocese of Taubaté

Ecclesiastical province of Aracaju

- Metropolitan Archdiocese of Aracaju
  - Diocese of Estância
  - Diocese of Propriá

Ecclesiastical province of Belém do Pará

- Metropolitan Archdiocese of Belém do Pará
  - Diocese of Abaetetuba
  - Diocese of Bragança do Pará
  - Diocese of Cametá
  - Diocese of Castanhal
  - Diocese of Macapá
  - Diocese of Marabá
  - Diocese of Ponta de Pedras
  - Diocese of (Santíssima) Conceição do Araguaia
  - Territorial Prelature of Marajó

Ecclesiastical province of Belo Horizonte

- Metropolitan Archdiocese of Belo Horizonte
  - Diocese of Divinópolis
  - Diocese of Luz
  - Diocese of Oliveira
  - Diocese of Sete Lagoas

Ecclesiastical province of Botucatu

- Metropolitan Archdiocese of Botucatu
  - Diocese of Araçatuba
  - Diocese of Assis
  - Diocese of Bauru
  - Diocese of Lins
  - Diocese of Marília
  - Diocese of Ourinhos
  - Diocese of Presidente Prudente

Ecclesiastical province of Brasília

- Metropolitan Archdiocese of Brasília
  - Diocese of Formosa
  - Diocese of Luziânia
  - Diocese of Uruaçu

Ecclesiastical province of Campinas

- Metropolitan Archdiocese of Campinas
  - Diocese of Amparo
  - Diocese of Bragança Paulista
  - Diocese of Limeira
  - Diocese of Piracicaba
  - Diocese of São Carlos

Ecclesiastical province of Campo Grande

- Metropolitan Archdiocese of Campo Grande
  - Diocese of Corumbá
  - Diocese of Coxim
  - Diocese of Dourados
  - Diocese of Jardim
  - Diocese of Naviraí
  - Diocese of Três Lagoas

Ecclesiastical province of Cascavel

- Metropolitan Archdiocese of Cascavel
  - Diocese of Foz do Iguaçu
  - Diocese of Palmas-Francisco Beltrão
  - Diocese of Toledo

Ecclesiastical province of Chapecó

- Metropolitan Archdiocese of Chapecó
  - Diocese of Caçador
  - Diocese of Joaçaba
  - Diocese of Lages

Ecclesiastical province of Cuiabá

- Metropolitan Archdiocese of Cuiabá
  - Diocese of Barra do Garças
  - Diocese of Diamantino
  - Diocese of Juína
  - Diocese of Primavera do Leste–Paranatinga
  - Diocese of Rondonópolis-Guiratinga
  - Diocese of São Luíz de Cáceres
  - Territorial Prelature of São Félix

Ecclesiastical province of Curitiba

- Metropolitan Archdiocese of Curitiba
  - Diocese of Guarapuava
  - Diocese of Paranaguá
  - Diocese of Ponta Grossa
  - Diocese of União da Vitória
  - Diocese of São José dos Pinhais

Ecclesiastical province of Diamantina

- Metropolitan Archdiocese of Diamantina
  - Diocese of Almenara
  - Diocese of Araçuaí
  - Diocese of Guanhães
  - Diocese of Teófilo Otoni

Ecclesiastical province of Feira de Santana

- Metropolitan Archdiocese of Feira de Santana
  - Diocese of Barra do Rio Grande
  - Diocese of Barreiras
  - Diocese of Bonfim
  - Diocese of Irecê
  - Diocese of Juazeiro
  - Diocese of Paulo Afonso
  - Diocese of Ruy Barbosa
  - Diocese of Serrinha

Ecclesiastical province of Florianópolis

- Metropolitan Archdiocese of Florianópolis
  - Diocese of Criciúma
  - Diocese of Tubarão

Ecclesiastical province of Fortaleza

- Metropolitan Archdiocese of Fortaleza
  - Diocese of Crateús
  - Diocese of Crato
  - Diocese of Iguatú
  - Diocese of Itapipoca
  - Diocese of Limoeiro do Norte
  - Diocese of Quixadá
  - Diocese of Sobral
  - Diocese of Tianguá

Ecclesiastical province of Goiânia

- Metropolitan Archdiocese of Goiânia
  - Diocese of Anápolis
  - Diocese of Goiás
  - Diocese of Ipameri
  - Diocese of Itumbiara
  - Diocese of Jataí
  - Diocese of Rubiataba-Mozarlândia
  - Diocese of São Luís de Montes Belos

Ecclesiastical province of Joinville

- Metropolitan Archdiocese of Joinville
  - Diocese of Blumenau
  - Diocese of Rio do Sul

Ecclesiastical province of Juiz de Fora

- Metropolitan Archdiocese of Juiz de Fora
  - Diocese of Leopoldina
  - Diocese of São João del Rei

Ecclesiastical province of Londrina

- Metropolitan Archdiocese of Londrina
  - Diocese of Apucarana
  - Diocese of Cornélio Procópio
  - Diocese of Jacarezinho

Ecclesiastical province of Maceió

- Metropolitan Archdiocese of Maceió
  - Diocese of Palmeira dos Índios
  - Diocese of Penedo

Ecclesiastical province of Manaus

- Metropolitan Archdiocese of Manaus
  - Diocese of Alto Solimões
  - Diocese of Borba
  - Diocese of Coari
  - Diocese of Parintins
  - Diocese of Roraima
  - Diocese of São Gabriel da Cachoeira
  - Territorial Prelature of Itacoatiara
  - Territorial Prelature of Tefé

Ecclesiastical province of Mariana

- Metropolitan Archdiocese of Mariana
  - Diocese of Caratinga
  - Diocese of Governador Valadares
  - Diocese of Itabira–Fabriciano

Ecclesiastical province of Maringá

- Metropolitan Archdiocese of Maringá
  - Diocese of Campo Mourão
  - Diocese of Paranavaí
  - Diocese of Umuarama

Ecclesiastical province of Montes Claros

- Metropolitan Archdiocese of Montes Claros
  - Diocese of Janaúba
  - Diocese of Januária
  - Diocese of Paracatu

Ecclesiastical province of Natal

- Metropolitan Archdiocese of Natal
  - Diocese of Caicó
  - Diocese of Mossoró

Ecclesiastical province of Niterói

- Metropolitan Archdiocese of Niterói (Nictheroy)
  - Diocese of Campos
  - Diocese of Nova Friburgo
  - Diocese of Petrópolis

Ecclesiastical province of Olinda e Recife

- Metropolitan Archdiocese of Olinda e Recife
  - Diocese of Afogados da Ingazeira
  - Diocese of Caruaru
  - Diocese of Floresta
  - Diocese of Garanhuns
  - Diocese of Nazaré
  - Diocese of Palmares
  - Diocese of Pesqueira
  - Diocese of Petrolina
  - Diocese of Salgueiro

Ecclesiastical province of Palmas

- Metropolitan Archdiocese of Palmas
  - Diocese of Cristalândia
  - Diocese of Miracema do Tocantins
  - Diocese of Porto Nacional
  - Diocese of Tocantinópolis

Ecclesiastical province of Paraíba

- Metropolitan Archdiocese of Paraíba
  - Diocese of Cajazieras
  - Diocese of Campina Grande
  - Diocese of Guarabira
  - Diocese of Patos

Ecclesiastical province of Passo Fundo

- Metropolitan Archdiocese of Passo Fundo
  - Diocese of Erexim
  - Diocese of Frederico Westphalen
  - Diocese of Vacaria

Ecclesiastical province of Pelotas

- Metropolitan Archdiocese of Pelotas
  - Diocese of Bagé
  - Diocese of Rio Grande

Ecclesiastical province of Porto Alegre

- Metropolitan Archdiocese of Porto Alegre
  - Diocese of Caxias do Sul
  - Diocese of Cruzeiro do Sul
  - Diocese of Montenegro
  - Diocese of Novo Hamburgo
  - Diocese of Osório

Ecclesiastical province of Porto Velho

- Metropolitan Archdiocese of Porto Velho
  - Diocese of Guajará-Mirim
  - Diocese of Humaitá
  - Diocese of Ji-Paraná
  - Diocese of Rio Branco
  - Territorial Prelature of Lábrea

Ecclesiastical province of Pouso Alegre

- Metropolitan Archdiocese of Pouso Alegre
  - Diocese of Campanha
  - Diocese of Guaxupé

Ecclesiastical province of Ribeirão Preto

- Metropolitan Archdiocese of Ribeirão Preto
  - Diocese of Franca
  - Diocese of Jaboticabal
  - Diocese of São João da Boa Vista

Ecclesiastical province of Santa Maria

- Metropolitan Archdiocese of Santa Maria
  - Diocese of Cachoeira do Sul
  - Diocese of Cruz Alta
  - Diocese of Santa Cruz do Sul
  - Diocese of Santo Ângelo
  - Diocese of Uruguaiana

Ecclesiastical province of Santarem

- Metropolitan Archdiocese of Santarém
  - Diocese of Óbidos
  - Diocese of Xingu-Altamira
  - Territorial Prelature of Alto Xingu-Tucumã
  - Territorial Prelature of Itaituba

Ecclesiastical province of São João Batista em Curitiba (Ukrainian Catholic, a Byzantine Rite)

- Metropolitan Archeparchy of São João Batista em Curitiba
  - Eparchy of Imaculada Conceição in Prudentópolis

Ecclesiastical province of São José do Rio Preto

- Metropolitan Archdiocese of São José do Rio Preto
  - Diocese of Barretos
  - Diocese of Catanduva
  - Diocese of Jales
  - Diocese of Votuporanga
Ecclesiastical province of São Luís do Maranhão

- Metropolitan Archdiocese of São Luís do Maranhão
  - Diocese of Bacabal
  - Diocese of Balsas
  - Diocese of Brejo
  - Diocese of Carolina
  - Diocese of Caxias do Maranhão
  - Diocese of Coroatá
  - Diocese of Grajaú
  - Diocese of Imperatriz
  - Diocese of Pinheiro
  - Diocese of Viana
  - Diocese of Zé-Doca

Ecclesiastical province of São Paulo (Roman and Byzantine rites)

- Metropolitan Archdiocese of São Paulo
  - Diocese of Campo Limpo
  - Diocese of Guarulhos
  - Diocese of Mogi das Cruzes
  - Diocese of Osasco
  - Diocese of Santo Amaro
  - Diocese of Santo André
  - Diocese of Santos
  - Diocese of São Miguel Paulista
  - Maronite Catholic Eparchy of Our Lady of Lebanon of São Paulo
  - Melkite Greek Catholic Eparchy of Nossa Senhora do Paraíso em São Paulo

Ecclesiastical province of São Salvador da Bahia

- Metropolitan Archdiocese of São Salvador da Bahia
  - Diocese of Alagoinhas
  - Diocese of Amargosa
  - Diocese of Camaçari
  - Diocese of Cruz das Almas
  - Diocese of Eunápolis
  - Diocese of Ilhéus
  - Diocese of Itabuna
  - Diocese of Teixeira de Freitas-Caravelas

Ecclesiastical province of São Sebastião do Rio de Janeiro

- Metropolitan Archdiocese of São Sebastião do Rio de Janeiro
  - Diocese of Barra do Piraí-Volta Redonda
  - Diocese of Duque de Caxias
  - Diocese of Itaguaí
  - Diocese of Nova Iguaçu
  - Diocese of Valença

Ecclesiastical province of Sorocaba

- Metropolitan Archdiocese of Sorocaba
  - Diocese of Itapetininga
  - Diocese of Itapeva
  - Diocese of Jundiaí
  - Diocese of Registro

Ecclesiastical province of Teresina

- Metropolitan Archdiocese of Teresina
  - Diocese of Bom Jesus do Gurguéia
  - Diocese of Campo Maior
  - Diocese of Floriano
  - Diocese of Oeiras
  - Diocese of Parnaíba
  - Diocese of Picos
  - Diocese of São Raimundo Nonato

Ecclesiastical province of Uberaba

- Metropolitan Archdiocese of Uberaba
  - Diocese of Ituiutaba
  - Diocese of Patos de Minas
  - Diocese of Uberlândia

Ecclesiastical province of Vitória

- Metropolitan Archdiocese of Vitória
  - Diocese of Cachoeiro de Itapemirim
  - Diocese of Colatina
  - Diocese of São Mateus

Ecclesiastical province of Vitória da Conquista

- Metropolitan Archdiocese of Vitória da Conquista
  - Diocese of Bom Jesus da Lapa
  - Diocese of Caetité
  - Diocese of Jequié
  - Diocese of Livramento de Nossa Senhora

=== Episcopal Conference of Chile ===
exempt, immediately subject to the Holy See

- Military Ordinariate of Chile
- Apostolic Vicariate of Aysén

Ecclesiastical province of Antofagasta

- Metropolitan Archdiocese of Antofagasta
  - Diocese of Arica
  - Diocese of Iquique
  - Diocese of Calama

Ecclesiastical province of Concepción

- Metropolitan Archdiocese of Concepción
  - Diocese of Chillán
  - Diocese of Los Ángeles
  - Diocese of Temuco
  - Diocese of Valdivia
  - Diocese of Villarrica

Ecclesiastical province of La Serena

- Metropolitan Archdiocese of La Serena
  - Diocese of Copiapó
  - Territorial Prelature of Illapel

Ecclesiastical province of Puerto Montt

- Metropolitan Archdiocese of Puerto Montt
  - Diocese of Osorno
  - Diocese of Punta Arenas
  - Diocese of San Carlos de Ancud

Ecclesiastical province of Santiago de Chile

- Metropolitan Archdiocese of Santiago de Chile
  - Diocese of Linares
  - Diocese of Melipilla
  - Diocese of Rancagua
  - Diocese of San Bernardo
  - Diocese of San Felipe
  - Diocese of Talca
  - Diocese of Valparaíso

=== Episcopal Conference of Colombia ===
exempt, immediately subject to the Holy See

- Military Ordinariate of Colombia
- Maronite Catholic Apostolic Exarchate of Colombia
- Apostolic Vicariate of Guapi
- Apostolic Vicariate of Inírida
- Apostolic Vicariate of Leticia
- Apostolic Vicariate of Mitú
- Apostolic Vicariate of Puerto Carreño
- Apostolic Vicariate of Puerto Gaitán
- Apostolic Vicariate of Puerto Leguízamo-Solano
- Apostolic Vicariate of San Andrés y Providencia
- Apostolic Vicariate of Tierradentro
- Apostolic Vicariate of Trinidad

Ecclesiastical province of Barranquilla

- Metropolitan Archdiocese of Barranquilla
  - Diocese of El Banco
  - Diocese of Riohacha
  - Diocese of Santa Marta
  - Diocese of Valledupar

Ecclesiastical province of Bogotá

- Metropolitan Archdiocese of Bogotá
  - Diocese of Engativá
  - Diocese of Facatativá
  - Diocese of Fontibón
  - Diocese of Girardot
  - Diocese of Soacha
  - Diocese of Zipaquirá

Ecclesiastical province of Bucaramanga

- Metropolitan Archdiocese of Bucaramanga
  - Diocese of Barrancabermeja
  - Diocese of Málaga-Soatá
  - Diocese of Socorro y San Gil
  - Diocese of Vélez

Ecclesiastical province of Cali

- Metropolitan Archdiocese of Cali
  - Diocese of Buenaventura
  - Diocese of Buga
  - Diocese of Cartago
  - Diocese of Palmira

Ecclesiastical province of Cartagena

- Metropolitan Archdiocese of Cartagena
  - Diocese of Magangué
  - Diocese of Montelibano
  - Diocese of Montería
  - Diocese of Sincelejo

Ecclesiastical province of Florencia

- Metropolitan Archdiocese of Florencia
  - Diocese of Mocoa–Sibundoy
  - Diocese of San Vicente del Caguán

Ecclesiastical province of Ibagué

- Metropolitan Archdiocese of Ibagué
  - Diocese of Espinal
  - Diocese of Garzón
  - Diocese of Líbano–Honda
  - Diocese of Neiva

Ecclesiastical province of Manizales

- Metropolitan Archdiocese of Manizales
  - Diocese of Armenia
  - Diocese of La Dorada-Guaduas
  - Diocese of Pereira

Ecclesiastical province of Medellín

- Metropolitan Archdiocese of Medellín
  - Diocese of Caldas
  - Diocese of Girardota
  - Diocese of Jericó
  - Diocese of Sonsón-Rionegro

Ecclesiastical province of Nueva Pamplona

- Metropolitan Archdiocese of Nueva Pamplona
  - Diocese of Arauca
  - Diocese of Cúcuta
  - Diocese of Ocaña
  - Diocese of Tibú

Ecclesiastical province of Popayán

- Metropolitan Archdiocese of Popayán
  - Diocese of Ipiales
  - Diocese of Pasto
  - Diocese of Tumaco

Ecclesiastical province of Santa Fe de Antioquia

- Metropolitan Archdiocese of Santa Fe de Antioquia
  - Diocese of Apartadó
  - Diocese of Ismina-Tadó
  - Diocese of Quibdó
  - Diocese of Santa Rosa de Osos

Ecclesiastical province of Tunja

- Metropolitan Archdiocese of Tunja
  - Diocese of Chiquinquirá
  - Diocese of Duitama-Sogamoso
  - Diocese of Garagoa
  - Diocese of Yopal

Ecclesiastical province of Villavicencio

- Metropolitan Archdiocese of Villavicencio
  - Diocese of Granada en Colombia
  - Diocese of San José del Guaviare

=== Episcopal Conference of Ecuador ===
exempt missionary circonscriptions, immediately subject to the Holy See

- Military Ordinariate of Ecuador
- Apostolic Vicariate of Aguarico
- Apostolic Vicariate of Esmeraldas
- Apostolic Vicariate of Galápagos
- Apostolic Vicariate of Méndez
- Apostolic Vicariate of Napo
- Apostolic Vicariate of Puyo
- Apostolic Vicariate of San Miguel de Sucumbíos
- Apostolic Vicariate of Zamora en Ecuador

Ecclesiastical province of Cuenca

- Metropolitan Archdiocese of Cuenca
  - Diocese of Azogues
  - Diocese of Loja
  - Diocese of Machala

Ecclesiastical province of Guayaquil

- Metropolitan Archdiocese of Guayaquil
  - Diocese of Babahoyo
  - Diocese of Daule
  - Diocese of San Jacinto
  - Diocese of Santa Elena

Ecclesiastical province of Portoviejo

- Metropolitan Archdiocese of Portoviejo
  - Diocese of Santo Domingo de los Colorados

Ecclesiastical province of Quito

- Metropolitan Archdiocese of Quito
  - Diocese of Ambato
  - Diocese of Guaranda
  - Diocese of Ibarra
  - Diocese of Latacunga
  - Diocese of Riobamba
  - Diocese of Tulcán

=== Episcopal Conference of Paraguay ===
exempt, immediately subject to the Holy See

- Military Ordinariate of Paraguay
- Apostolic Vicariate of Chaco Paraguayo
- Apostolic Vicariate of Pilcomayo

Ecclesiastical province of Asunción

- Metropolitan Archdiocese of Asunción (1547)
  - Diocese of Benjamín Aceval
  - Diocese of Caacupé
  - Diocese of Canindeyú
  - Diocese of Carapeguá
  - Diocese of Ciudad del Este
  - Diocese of Concepción en Paraguay
  - Diocese of Coronel Oviedo
  - Diocese of Encarnación
  - Diocese of San Juan Bautista de las Misiones
  - Diocese of San Lorenzo
  - Diocese of San Pedro
  - Diocese of Villarrica del Espíritu Santo

=== Episcopal Conference of Peru ===
exempt, immediately subject to the Holy See

- Military Ordinariate of Peru
- Apostolic Vicariate of Iquitos
- Apostolic Vicariate of Jaén en Perú
- Apostolic Vicariate of Pucallpa
- Apostolic Vicariate of Puerto Maldonado
- Apostolic Vicariate of Requena
- Apostolic Vicariate of San José de Amazonas
- Apostolic Vicariate of San Ramón
- Apostolic Vicariate of Yurimaguas

Ecclesiastical province of Arequipa

- Metropolitan Archdiocese of Arequipa
  - Diocese of Puno (1861)
  - Diocese of Tacna y Moquegua
  - Territorial Prelature of Ayaviri
  - Territorial Prelature of Chuquibamba
  - Territorial Prelature of Juli
  - Territorial Prelature of Santiago Apóstol de Huancané

Ecclesiastical province of Ayacucho

- Metropolitan Archdiocese of Ayacucho (1609)
  - Diocese of Huancavélica
  - Territorial Prelature of Caravelí

Ecclesiastical province of Cuzco

- Metropolitan Archdiocese of Cuzco (1536)
  - Diocese of Abancay
  - Diocese of Sicuani
  - Territorial Prelature of Chuquibambilla

Ecclesiastical province of Huancayo

- Metropolitan Archdiocese of Huancayo
  - Diocese of Huánuco
  - Diocese of Tarma

Ecclesiastical province of Lima

- Metropolitan Archdiocese of Lima (1541)
  - Diocese of Callao
  - Diocese of Carabayllo
  - Diocese of Chosica
  - Diocese of Huacho
  - Diocese of Ica
  - Diocese of Lurín
  - Territorial Prelature of Yauyos

Ecclesiastical province of Piura

- Metropolitan Archdiocese of Piura
  - Diocese of Chachapoyas
  - Diocese of Chiclayo
  - Diocese of Chulucanas
  - Territorial Prelature of Chota

Ecclesiastical province of Trujillo

- Metropolitan Archdiocese of Trujillo
  - Diocese of Cajamarca
  - Diocese of Chimbote
  - Diocese of Huaraz
  - Diocese of Huarí
  - Territorial Prelature of Huamachuco
  - Territorial Prelature of Moyobamba

=== Episcopal Conference of Uruguay ===
Ecclesiastical province of Montevideo

- Metropolitan Archdiocese of Montevideo (1878)
  - Diocese of Canelones
  - Diocese of Florida
  - Diocese of Maldonado-Punta del Este-Minas
  - Diocese of Melo
  - Diocese of Mercedes
  - Diocese of Salto
  - Diocese of San José de Mayo
  - Diocese of Tacuarembó

=== Episcopal Conference of Venezuela ===
Exempt, i.e. immediately subject to the Holy See

- Military Ordinariate of Venezuela
- Catholic missionary circonscriptions:
  - Apostolic Vicariate of Caroní
  - Apostolic Vicariate of Puerto Ayacucho
  - Apostolic Vicariate of Tucupita
- Eastern dioceses:
  - Melkite Greek Catholic Apostolic Exarchate of Venezuela (Byzantine Rite), with cathedral see in Caracas
  - Syriac Catholic Apostolic Exarchate of Venezuela (Antiochian Rite), with cathedral see at Maracay, Aragua

Ecclesiastical province of Barquisimeto

- Metropolitan Archdiocese of Barquisimeto
  - Diocese of Acarigua–Araure
  - Diocese of Carora
  - Diocese of Guanare
  - Diocese of San Felipe

Ecclesiastical province of Calabozo

- Metropolitan Archdiocese of Calabozo
  - Diocese of San Fernando de Apure
  - Diocese of Valle de la Pascua

Ecclesiastical province of Caracas, Santiago de Venezuela

- Metropolitan Archdiocese of Caracas, Santiago de Venezuela (1637)
  - Diocese of Guarenas
  - Diocese of La Guaira
  - Diocese of Los Teques
  - Diocese of Petare

Ecclesiastical province of Ciudad Bolívar

- Metropolitan Archdiocese of Ciudad Bolívar
  - Diocese of Ciudad Guayana
  - Diocese of Maturín

Ecclesiastical province of Coro

- Metropolitan Archdiocese of Coro
  - Diocese of Punto Fijo

Ecclesiastical province of Cumaná

- Metropolitan Archdiocese of Cumaná
  - Diocese of Barcelona
  - Diocese of Carúpano
  - Diocese of El Tigre
  - Diocese of Margarita

Ecclesiastical province of Maracaibo

- Metropolitan Archdiocese of Maracaibo
  - Diocese of Cabimas
  - Diocese of El Vigia-San Carlos del Zulia
  - Diocese of Machiques

Ecclesiastical province of Mérida in Venezuela

- Metropolitan Archdiocese of Mérida in Venezuela
  - Diocese of Barinas
  - Diocese of Guasdualito
  - Diocese of San Cristóbal de Venezuela
  - Diocese of Trujillo

Ecclesiastical province of Valencia en Venezuela

- Metropolitan Archdiocese of Valencia en Venezuela
  - Diocese of Maracay
  - Diocese of Puerto Cabello
  - Diocese of San Carlos de Venezuela

== Asia (Latin and Eastern Churches) ==
=== Exempt dioceses or mission sui juris in Asian countries without episcopal conferences or ecclesiastical provinces ===
exempt, nation-covering diocesan circonscriptions, often not called after the see, each immediately subject to the Holy See

- Apostolic Prefecture of Baku, in and for all Azerbaijan
- Apostolic Administration of Kyrgyzstan, in Bishkek, for all Kyrgyzstan
- Apostolic Vicariate of Nepal, in Kathmandu, for all Nepal
- Apostolic Administration of Uzbekistan, in Tashkent, for all Uzbekistan
- Apostolic Administration of Kazakhstan and Central Asia for Faithful of Byzantine Rite, in Karaganda, for Kazakhstan, Kyrgyzstan, Tajikistan, Turkmenistan and Uzbekistan

Missions sui juris (not requiring a prelate; just an ecclesiastical superior), immediately subject to the Holy See

- Mission sui juris of Afghanistan, in Kabul, for all Afghanistan
- Mission sui juris of Tajikistan, for all Tajikistan
- Mission sui juris of Turkmenistan, in Ashgabat, for all Turkmenistan

=== Episcopal conference of the Arab region Latin bishops (includes parts of North and Eastern Africa) ===
all Latin dioceses are exempt, i.e. no ecclesiastical province, but each immediately subject to the Holy See. They alone constitute the Episcopal conference proper, not the numerous Eastern Catholic Ordinaries, who are grouped in specific 'national' Assemblies below

in Asian Middle East:

- Latin Patriarchate of Jerusalem, no suffragan, for all of the Holy Land (Palestine & Israel), Jordan and Cyprus
- Archdiocese of Baghdad (1632), no suffragan, for all of Iraq
- Apostolic Vicariate of Aleppo, for all of Syria
- Apostolic Vicariate of Beirut, for all of Lebanon
- Apostolic Vicariate of Northern Arabia, in Kuwait City, for all of Kuwait, Bahrain, Saudi Arabia and Qatar
- Apostolic Vicariate of Southern Arabia, in Abu Dhabi (UAE), for all of Oman, United Arab Emirates and Yemen

in Africa: see there (for Egypt, Djibouti and Somalia)

==== Assembly of Catholic Ordinaries of Egypt ====
see Africa

==== Assembly of Catholic Ordinaries of the Holy Land (Palestine/Israel & Jordan) ====
- Syriac Catholic Patriarchal Exarchate of Jerusalem, with cathedral see in Jerusalem, for the Holy Land (Israel) and Jordan

==== Assembly of Catholic Ordinaries of Iraq ====
- Syriac Catholic Archeparchy of Baghdad, Archeparchy for central Iraq
- Syriac Catholic Patriarchal Exarchate of Basra and the Gulf, for southern Iraq and Kuwait
- Syriac Catholic Archeparchy of Mosul, Archeparchy for northern Iraq

==== Assembly of Catholic Ordinaries of Lebanon ====
- Syriac Catholic Patriarchate of Antioch, with a cathedral see in Beirut, for Lebanon
- Syriac Catholic Eparchy of Beirut

==== Assembly of Catholic Ordinaries in Syria ====
- Syriac Catholic Archeparchy of Aleppo, Archeparchy for part of Syria (cfr. infra)
- Syriac Metropolitan Archeparchy of Damascus
- Syriac Catholic Archeparchy of Hassaké–Nisibi, Archeparchy for part of Syria (cfr. infra)
- Syriac Metropolitan Archeparchy of Homs

=== Episcopal Conference of Iran ===
No ecclesiastical province, the Latin Church has only the exempt Roman Catholic Archdiocese of Teheran-Isfahan (1629), directly subject to the Holy See

The conference also includes Eastern Catholic bishops of two churches:

- Chaldean Rite - four dioceses - archdioceses Ahvaz, Tehran (Metropolitan), Urmyā (Shahpur) and its sole suffragan, Salmas
- Armenian Rite - diocese of Isfahan

=== Episcopal Conference of Kazakhstan ===
Ecclesiastical Province of Mary Most Holy in Astana, covering all Kazakhstan

- Metropolitan Archdiocese of Mary Most Holy in Astana (2003)
  - Diocese of Most Holy Trinity in Almaty (2003)
  - Diocese of Karaganda
  - Apostolic Administration of Atyrau

=== Episcopal Conference of Turkey ===
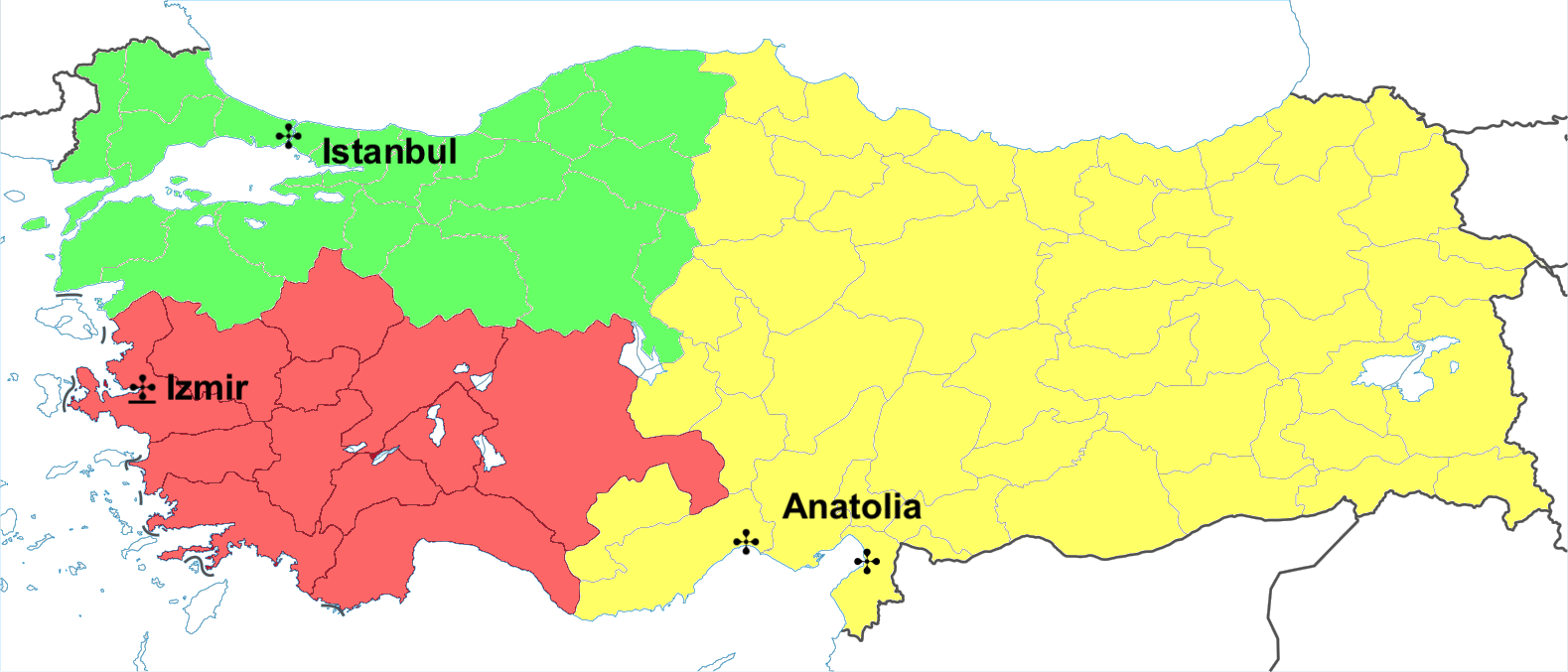
Latin Church dioceses in Turkey

covering transcontinental Turkey, which is not comprised in any Latin ecclesiastical province

- Archdiocese of İzmir (1818) (in Asia Minor), nominally Metropolitan but no suffragan

Exempt Latin dioceses, immediately subject to the Holy See

- Apostolic Vicariate of Istanbul, in Istanbul (formerly Constantinople), partly in and for European Turkey
- Apostolic Vicariate of Anatolia, in İskenderun

Eastern (arch)dioceses, directly subject to their Patriarchs

- Armenian Catholic Archeparchy of Istanbul, directly under the Armenian Catholic Patriarch of Cilicia, whose ancient see takes its title from a region in Turkey, yet his actual see is in Lebanon.
- Chaldean Catholic Archeparchy of Amida (Diyarbakır), immediately subject to the patriarch of Babylon
- Greek-Melkite Patriarchal Exarchate of Istanbul, directly subject to the Melkite Catholic Patriarch of Antioch (Byzantine Rite in Greek)
- Syriac Catholic Patriarchal Exarchate of Turkey, immediately under the Syriac Catholic Patriarch of Antioch (Antiochian Rite)

=== Episcopal Conference of Bangladesh ===
Catholic Bishops' Conference of Bangladesh

Ecclesiastical Province of Dhaka

- Metropolitan Archdiocese of Dhaka (1886)
  - Diocese of Dinajpur
  - Diocese of Mymensingh
  - Diocese of Rajshahi
  - Diocese of Sylhet (2011)

Ecclesiastical Province of Chittagong

- Metropolitan Diocese of Chittagong (1927)
  - Diocese of Barisal
  - Diocese of Khulna

=== Episcopal Conference of Myanmar ===
Ecclesiastical Province of Mandalay

- Metropolitan Archdiocese of Mandalay (1955)
  - Diocese of Banmaw
  - Diocese of Hakha
  - Diocese of Kalay
  - Diocese of Lashio
  - Diocese of Myitkyina

Ecclesiastical Province of Taunggyi

- Metropolitan Archdiocese of Taunggyi (1961)
  - Diocese of Kengtung
  - Diocese of Loikaw
  - Diocese of Pekhon
  - Diocese of Taungngu

Ecclesiastical Province of Yangon (Rangoon)

- Metropolitan Archdiocese of Yangon (Rangoon) (1955)
  - Diocese of Hpa-an
  - Diocese of Mawlamyine
  - Diocese of Pathein
  - Diocese of Pyay

=== Episcopal Conference of East Timor ===
- Metropolitan Archdiocese of Díli (1940)
  - Diocese of Baucau
  - Diocese of Maliana

=== Episcopal Conference of India, including Bhutan ===
Latin Church provinces and dioceses of the Catholic church in India. The dioceses making up a province have different shades of the same colour.

The Episcopal Conference of India includes dioceses in the country of Bhutan. Includes various Eastern Church dioceses, notably Syro-Malankara (an Antiochian Rite) and Syro-Malabar (a Syro-Oriental Rite), either in Eastern provinces of their own particular churches, exempt or (some Syro-Malabar) as suffragans of Latin Catholic Metropolitan Archbishops in their mixed-rite ecclesiastical provinces, are italicized..

Exempt Eastern Catholic eparchies (diocese), immediately subject to the Holy See

- Syro-Malankara Catholic Eparchy of Gurgaon, see located near Delhi, serving 22 states in India

Ecclesiastical Province of Agra

- Metropolitan Archdiocese of Agra (1886)
  - Diocese of Ajmer (1913)
  - Diocese of Allahabad (1886)
  - Diocese of Bareilly (1989)
  - Diocese of Jaipur (2005)
  - Diocese of Jhansi (1954)
  - Diocese of Lucknow (1946)
  - Diocese of Meerut (1956)
  - Diocese of Udaipur (1984)
  - Diocese of Varanasi (1970)

Ecclesiastical Province of Bangalore (entirely Latin Church)

- Metropolitan Archdiocese of Bangalore (1886)
  - Diocese of Belgaum
  - Diocese of Bellary
  - Diocese of Chikmagalur
  - Diocese of Gulbarga
  - Diocese of Karwar
  - Diocese of Mangalore
  - Diocese of Mysore
  - Diocese of Shimoga
  - Diocese of Udupi

Ecclesiastical Province of Bhopal

- Metropolitan Archdiocese of Bhopal (1963)
  - Diocese of Gwalior
  - Diocese of Indore
  - Diocese of Jabalpur
  - Diocese of Jhabua
  - Diocese of Khandwa,

Ecclesiastical Province of Bombay

- Metropolitan Archdiocese of Bombay (1886)
  - Diocese of Nashik
  - Diocese of Poona
  - Diocese of Vasai

Ecclesiastical Province of Calcutta (entirely Latin Church)

- Metropolitan Archdiocese of Calcutta (1886)
  - Diocese of Asansol
  - Diocese of Bagdogra
  - Diocese of Baruipur
  - Diocese of Darjeeling, including all Bhutan
  - Diocese of Jalpaiguri
  - Diocese of Krishnagar
  - Diocese of Raiganj

Ecclesiastical Province of Calicut (entirely Latin Church)

- Metropolitan Archdiocese of Calicut
  - Diocese of Kannur
  - Diocese of Sultanpet

Ecclesiastical Province of Cuttack-Bhubaneswar (entirely Latin Church)

- Metropolitan Archdiocese of Cuttack-Bhubaneswar
  - Diocese of Balasore
  - Diocese of Berhampur
  - Diocese of Rayagada
  - Diocese of Rourkela
  - Diocese of Sambalpur

Ecclesiastical Province of Delhi (entirely Latin Church)

- Metropolitan Archdiocese of Delhi
  - Diocese of Jammu-Srinagar
  - Diocese of Jalandhar
  - Diocese of Simla and Chandigarh

Ecclesiastical Province of Gandhinagar

- Metropolitan Archdiocese of Gandhinagar
  - Diocese of Ahmedabad
  - Diocese of Baroda

Ecclesiastical Province of Goa and Daman (entirely Latin Church)

- Metropolitan Archdiocese of Goa and Daman (1533), primatial see of the East, Patriarchate of the East Indies
  - Diocese of Sindhudurg

Ecclesiastical Province of Guwahati (entirely Latin Church)

- Metropolitan Archdiocese of Guwahati
  - Diocese of Bongaigaon
  - Diocese of Dibrugarh
  - Diocese of Diphu
  - Diocese of Itanagar
  - Diocese of Miao
  - Diocese of Tezpur

Ecclesiastical Province of Hyderabad

- Metropolitan Archdiocese of Hyderabad
  - Diocese of Cuddapah
  - Diocese of Khammam
  - Diocese of Kurnool
  - Diocese of Nalgonda
  - Diocese of Warangal

Ecclesiastical Province of Imphal (entirely Latin Church)

- Metropolitan Archdiocese of Imphal
  - Diocese of Kohima

Ecclesiastical Province of Madras and Mylapore (entirely Latin Church)

- Metropolitan Archdiocese of Madras and Mylapore
  - Diocese of Chingleput
  - Diocese of Coimbatore
  - Diocese of Ootacamund
  - Diocese of Vellore

Ecclesiastical Province of Madurai (entirely Latin Church)

- Metropolitan Archdiocese of Madurai
  - Diocese of Dindigul
  - Diocese of Kottar
  - Diocese of Kuzhithurai
  - Diocese of Palayamkottai
  - Diocese of Sivagangai
  - Diocese of Tiruchirapalli
  - Diocese of Tuticorin

Ecclesiastical Province of Nagpur

- Metropolitan Archdiocese of Nagpur
  - Diocese of Amravati
  - Diocese of Aurangabad

Ecclesiastical Province of Patna (entirely Latin Church)

- Metropolitan Archdiocese of Patna
  - Diocese of Bettiah
  - Diocese of Bhagalpur
  - Diocese of Buxar
  - Diocese of Muzaffarpur
  - Diocese of Purnea

Ecclesiastical Province of Pondicherry and Cuddalore (entirely Latin Church)

- Metropolitan Archdiocese of Pondicherry and Cuddalore
  - Diocese of Dharmapuri
  - Diocese of Kumbakonam
  - Diocese of Salem
  - Diocese of Tanjore

Ecclesiastical Province of Raipur

- Metropolitan Archdiocese of Raipur
  - Diocese of Ambikapur
  - Diocese of Jashpur
  - Diocese of Raigarh

Ecclesiastical Province of Ranchi (entirely Latin Church)

- Metropolitan Archdiocese of Ranchi
  - Diocese of Daltonganj
  - Diocese of Dumka
  - Diocese of Gumla
  - Diocese of Hazaribag
  - Diocese of Jamshedpur
  - Diocese of Khunti
  - Diocese of Port Blair, on the Andaman and Nicobar islands
  - Diocese of Simdega

Ecclesiastical Province of Shillong (entirely Latin Church)

- Metropolitan Archdiocese of Shillong
  - Diocese of Agartala
  - Diocese of Aizawl
  - Diocese of Jowai
  - Diocese of Nongstoin
  - Diocese of Tura

Ecclesiastical Province of Thiruvananthapuram (entirely Latin Church)

- Metropolitan Archdiocese of Thiruvananthapuram
  - Diocese of Alleppey
  - Diocese of Neyyattinkara
  - Diocese of Punalur
  - Diocese of Quilon

Ecclesiastical Province of Verapoly (entirely Latin Church)

- Metropolitan Archdiocese of Verapoly
  - Diocese of Cochin
  - Diocese of Kottapuram
  - Diocese of Vijayapuram

Ecclesiastical Province of Visakhapatnam (entirely Latin Church)

- Metropolitan Archdiocese of Visakhapatnam
  - Diocese of Eluru
  - Diocese of Guntur
  - Diocese of Nellore
  - Diocese of Srikakulam
  - Diocese of Vijayawada

Syro-Malabar Catholic Ecclesiastical Province of Eranakulam - Angamaly

- Syro-Malabar Catholic Archeparchy of Eranakulam-Angamaly, the Major Archeparchy, head of the Eastern particular church, and Metropolitan Archeparchy of Eranakulam-Angamaly
  - Syro-Malabar Catholic Eparchy of Idukki
  - Syro-Malabar Catholic Eparchy of Kothamangalam

Syro-Malabar Catholic Ecclesiastical Province of Changanassery

- Syro-Malabar Metropolitan Archeparchy of Changanassery
  - Syro-Malabar Catholic Eparchy of Kanjirappally
  - Syro-Malabar Catholic Eparchy of Palai
  - Syro-Malabar Catholic Eparchy of Thuckalay

Syro-Malabar Catholic Ecclesiastical Province of Faridabad

- Syro-Malabar Catholic Archeparchy of Faridabad, see near Delhi, also serves Haryana, Punjab, Himachal Pradesh, Jammu and Kashmir and parts of Uttar Pradesh
  - Syro-Malabar Catholic Eparchy of Bijnor
  - Syro-Malabar Catholic Eparchy of Gorakhpur

Syro-Malabar Catholic Ecclesiastical Province of Kalyan

- Syro-Malabar Catholic Archeparchy of Kalyan, see located near Bombay, but serves all of Maharashtra state
  - Syro-Malabar Catholic Eparchy of Chanda
  - Syro-Malabar Catholic Eparchy of Rajkot

Syro-Malabar Catholic Ecclesiastical Province of Shamshabad

- Syro-Malabar Catholic Archeparchy of Shamshabad
  - Syro-Malabar Catholic Eparchy of Adilabad

Syro-Malabar Catholic Ecclesiastical Province of Tellicherry

- Syro-Malabar Metropolitan Archeparchy of Tellicherry
  - Syro-Malabar Catholic Eparchy of Belthangady
  - Syro-Malabar Catholic Eparchy of Bhadravathi
  - Syro-Malabar Catholic Eparchy of Mananthavady
  - Syro-Malabar Catholic Eparchy of Mandya
  - Syro-Malabar Catholic Eparchy of Thamarassery

Syro-Malabar Catholic Ecclesiastical Province of Thrissur

- Syro-Malabar Metropolitan Archeparchy of Thrissur
  - Syro-Malabar Catholic Eparchy of Hosur
  - Syro-Malabar Catholic Eparchy of Irinjalakuda
  - Syro-Malabar Catholic Eparchy of Palghat
  - Syro-Malabar Catholic Eparchy of Ramanathapuram

Syro-Malabar Catholic Ecclesiastical Province of Ujjain

- Syro-Malabar Catholic Archeparchy of Ujjain
  - Syro-Malabar Catholic Eparchy of Jagdalpur
  - Syro-Malabar Catholic Eparchy of Sagar
  - Syro-Malabar Catholic Eparchy of Satna

Syro-Malabar Catholic Archeparchy of Kottayam

- Syro-Malabar Catholic Archeparchy of Kottayam (Archeparchy of Kottayam, no suffragan)

Syro-Malankara Ecclesiastical Province of Trivandrum

- Syro-Malankara Catholic Major Archeparchy of Trivandrum, the Major Archbishop, chief of the particular church
  - Syro-Malankara Catholic Eparchy of Marthandom
  - Syro-Malankara Catholic Eparchy of Mavelikara
  - Syro-Malankara Catholic Eparchy of Parassala
  - Syro-Malankara Catholic Eparchy of Pathanamthitta
  - Syro-Malankara Catholic Eparchy of St. Ephrem of Khadki

Syro-Malankara Ecclesiastical Province of Tiruvalla

- Syro-Malankara Catholic Archeparchy of Tiruvalla
  - Syro-Malankara Catholic Eparchy of Muvattupuzha
  - Syro-Malankara Catholic Eparchy of Bathery
  - Syro-Malankara Catholic Eparchy of Puthur

=== Episcopal Conference of Indonesia ===
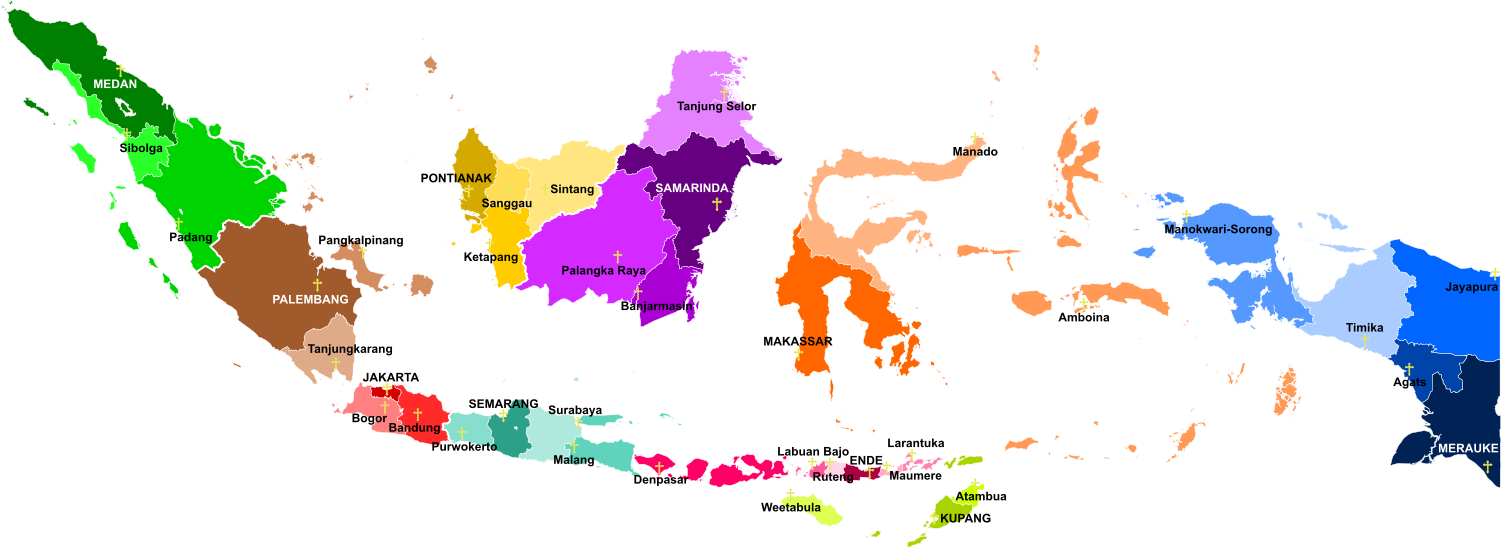

Exempt diocese, immediately subject to the Holy See

- Military Ordinariate of Indonesia

Ecclesiastical Province of Jakarta

- Roman Catholic Archdiocese of Jakarta (1961)
  - Roman Catholic Diocese of Bandung
  - Roman Catholic Diocese of Bogor

Ecclesiastical Province of Ende

- Roman Catholic Archdiocese of Ende (1961)
  - Roman Catholic Diocese of Denpasar
  - Roman Catholic Diocese of Larantuka
  - Roman Catholic Diocese of Maumere
  - Roman Catholic Diocese of Ruteng
  - Roman Catholic Diocese of Labuan Bajo

Ecclesiastical Province of Kupang

- Roman Catholic Archdiocese of Kupang (1967)
  - Roman Catholic Diocese of Atambua
  - Roman Catholic Diocese of Weetebula

Ecclesiastical Province of Makassar

- Roman Catholic Archdiocese of Makassar (1961)
  - Roman Catholic Diocese of Amboina
  - Roman Catholic Diocese of Manado

Ecclesiastical Province of Medan

- Roman Catholic Archdiocese of Medan (1961)
  - Roman Catholic Diocese of Padang
  - Roman Catholic Diocese of Sibolga

Ecclesiastical Province of Merauke

- Roman Catholic Archdiocese of Merauke (1966)
  - Roman Catholic Diocese of Agats
  - Roman Catholic Diocese of Jayapura
  - Roman Catholic Diocese of Manokwari-Sorong
  - Roman Catholic Diocese of Timika

Ecclesiastical Province of Palembang

- Roman Catholic Archdiocese of Palembang (1961)
  - Roman Catholic Diocese of Pangkal-Pinang
  - Roman Catholic Diocese of Tanjungkarang

Ecclesiastical Province of Pontianak

- Roman Catholic Archdiocese of Pontianak
  - Roman Catholic Diocese of Ketapang
  - Roman Catholic Diocese of Sanggau
  - Roman Catholic Diocese of Sintang

Ecclesiastical Province of Samarinda

- Roman Catholic Archdiocese of Samarinda
  - Roman Catholic Diocese of Banjarmasin
  - Roman Catholic Diocese of Palangkaraya
  - Roman Catholic Diocese of Tanjung Selor

Ecclesiastical Province of Semarang

- Roman Catholic Archdiocese of Semarang
  - Roman Catholic Diocese of Malang
  - Roman Catholic Diocese of Purwokerto
  - Roman Catholic Diocese of Surabaya

=== Episcopal Conference of Laos and Cambodia ===
three exempt missionary dioceses in Cambodia, no ecclesiastical province but directly subject to Rome

- Apostolic Vicariate of Phnom Penh
- Apostolic Prefecture of Battambang
- Apostolic Prefecture of Kampong Cham

four exempt missionary dioceses in Laos, no ecclesiastical province but directly subject to Rome

- Apostolic Vicariate of Luang Prabang
- Apostolic Vicariate of Pakse
- Apostolic Vicariate of Savannakhet
- Apostolic Vicariate of Vientiane

=== Episcopal Conference of Malaysia, Singapore and Brunei ===
Exempt (arch)dioceses in Brunei and Singapore (no provinces nor national episcopal conferences, immediately subject to Rome)

- Archdiocese of Singapore (1972), covering Singapore
- Apostolic Vicariate of Brunei Darussalam, covering Brunei (on Borneo)

Ecclesiastical Province of Kuala Lumpur, in Peninsular Malaysia (Malaya)

- Metropolitan Archdiocese of Kuala Lumpur
  - Diocese of Melaka-Johor (1888)
  - Diocese of Penang

Ecclesiastical Province of Kuching, in Sarawak state, on Borneo

- Metropolitan Archdiocese of Kuching
  - Diocese of Miri
  - Diocese of Sibu

Ecclesiastical Province of Kota Kinabalu, in Sabah state, on Borneo

- Metropolitan Archdiocese of Kota Kinabalu
  - Diocese of Keningau
  - Diocese of Sandakan

=== Episcopal Conference of Pakistan ===
Pakistan Catholic Bishops’ Conference (P.C.B.C.)

Exempt, directly subject to the Holy See

- Apostolic Vicariate of Quetta, in Balochistan province

Ecclesiastical Province of Karachi, in Sindh province

- Metropolitan Archdiocese of Karachi, in Sindh
  - Diocese of Hyderabad, in Sindh

Ecclesiastical Province of Lahore, in Punjab province

- Metropolitan Archdiocese of Lahore, in Punjab
  - Diocese of Rawalpindi, in Punjab
  - Diocese of Multan, in Punjab
  - Diocese of Faisalabad, in Punjab

=== Episcopal Conference of the Philippines ===
Exempt dioceses, immediately subject to the Holy See

- Military Ordinariate of the Philippines
- six Apostolic Vicariates
  - Apostolic Vicariate of Bontoc-Lagawe
  - Apostolic Vicariate of Jolo
  - Apostolic Vicariate of Puerto Princesa
  - Apostolic Vicariate of San Jose in Mindoro
  - Apostolic Vicariate of Tabuk
  - Apostolic Vicariate of Taytay

Ecclesiastical Province of Caceres

- Metropolitan Archdiocese of Caceres
  - Diocese of Daet
  - Diocese of Legazpi
  - Diocese of Libmanan
  - Diocese of Masbate
  - Diocese of Sorsogon
  - Diocese of Virac

Ecclesiastical Province of Cagayan de Oro

- Metropolitan Archdiocese of Cagayan de Oro
  - Diocese of Butuan
  - Diocese of Malaybalay
  - Diocese of Prosperidad
  - Diocese of Surigao
  - Diocese of Tandag

Ecclesiastical Province of Capiz

- Metropolitan Archdiocese of Capiz
  - Diocese of Kalibo
  - Diocese of Romblon

Ecclesiastical Province of Cebu

- Metropolitan Archdiocese of Cebu
  - Diocese of Dumaguete
  - Diocese of Maasin
  - Diocese of Tagbilaran
  - Diocese of Talibon

Ecclesiastical Province of Cotabato

- Metropolitan Archdiocese of Cotabato
  - Diocese of Kidapawan
  - Diocese of Marbel

Ecclesiastical Province of Davao

- Metropolitan Archdiocese of Davao
  - Diocese of Digos
  - Diocese of Mati
  - Diocese of Tagum

Ecclesiastical Province of Jaro

- Metropolitan Archdiocese of Jaro
  - Diocese of Bacolod
  - Diocese of Kabankalan
  - Diocese of San Carlos
  - Diocese of San Jose de Antique

Ecclesiastical Province of Lingayen-Dagupan

- Metropolitan Archdiocese of Lingayen-Dagupan
  - Diocese of Alaminos
  - Diocese of Cabanatuan
  - Diocese of San Fernando de La Union
  - Diocese of San Jose in Nueva Ecija
  - Diocese of Urdaneta

Ecclesiastical Province of Lipa

- Metropolitan Archdiocese of Lipa
  - Diocese of Boac
  - Diocese of Calapan
  - Diocese of Gumaca
  - Diocese of Lucena
  - Territorial Prelature of Infanta

Ecclesiastical Province of Manila

- Metropolitan Archdiocese of Manila
  - Diocese of Antipolo
  - Diocese of Cubao
  - Diocese of Imus
  - Diocese of Kalookan
  - Diocese of Malolos
  - Diocese of Novaliches
  - Diocese of Parañaque
  - Diocese of Pasig
  - Diocese of San Pablo

Ecclesiastical Province of Nueva Segovia

- Metropolitan Archdiocese of Nueva Segovia
  - Diocese of Baguio
  - Diocese of Bangued
  - Diocese of Laoag

Ecclesiastical Province of Ozamis

- Metropolitan Archdiocese of Ozamis
  - Diocese of Dipolog
  - Diocese of Iligan
  - Diocese of Pagadian
  - Territorial Prelature of Marawi

Ecclesiastical Province of Palo

- Metropolitan Archdiocese of Palo
  - Diocese of Borongan
  - Diocese of Calbayog
  - Diocese of Catarman
  - Diocese of Naval

Ecclesiastical Province of San Fernando

- Metropolitan Archdiocese of San Fernando
  - Diocese of Balanga
  - Diocese of Iba
  - Diocese of Tarlac

Ecclesiastical Province of Tuguegarao

- Metropolitan Archdiocese of Tuguegarao
  - Diocese of Bayombong
  - Diocese of Ilagan
  - Territorial Prelature of Batanes

Ecclesiastical Province of Zamboanga

- Metropolitan Archdiocese of Zamboanga
  - Roman Catholic Diocese of Ipil
  - Territorial Prelature of Isabela

=== Episcopal Conference of Sri Lanka, including the Maldives ===
Ecclesiastical Province of Colombo

- Metropolitan Archdiocese of Colombo, including all the Maldives
  - Diocese of Anuradhapura
  - Diocese of Badulla
  - Diocese of Batticaloa
  - Diocese of Chilaw
  - Diocese of Galle
  - Diocese of Jaffna
  - Diocese of Kandy
  - Diocese of Kurunegala
  - Diocese of Mannar
  - Diocese of Ratnapura
  - Diocese of Trincomalee

=== Episcopal Conference of Thailand ===
Ecclesiastical Province of Bangkok

- Metropolitan Archdiocese of Bangkok
  - Diocese of Chanthaburi
  - Diocese of Chiang Mai
  - Diocese of Chiang Rai
  - Diocese of Nakhon Sawan
  - Diocese of Ratchaburi
  - Diocese of Surat Thani

Ecclesiastical Province of Thare and Nonseng

- Metropolitan Archdiocese of Thare and Nonseng
  - Diocese of Nakhon Ratchasima
  - Diocese of Ubon Ratchathani
  - Diocese of Udon Thani

=== Episcopal Conference of Vietnam ===
Episcopal Conference of Vietnam (Hội đồng Giám mục Việt Nam), at Hồ Chí Minh City

Ecclesiastical Province of Hà Nội

- Metropolitan Archdiocese of Hà Nội
  - Diocese of Bắc Ninh
  - Diocese of Bùi Chu
  - Diocese of Hải Phòng
  - Diocese of Hà Tĩnh
  - Diocese of Hưng Hóa
  - Diocese of Lạng Sơn and Cao Bằng
  - Diocese of Phát Diệm
  - Diocese of Thái Bình
  - Diocese of Thanh Hóa
  - Diocese of Vinh

Ecclesiastical Province of Huế

- Metropolitan Archdiocese of Huế
  - Diocese of Ban Mê Thuột
  - Diocese of Đà Nẵng
  - Diocese of Kon Tum
  - Diocese of Nha Trang
  - Diocese of Quy Nhơn

Ecclesiastical Province of Hồ Chí Minh City

- Metropolitan Archdiocese of Hồ Chí Minh City (Thành phố Hồ Chí Minh; formerly Saigon)
  - Diocese of Bà Rịa
  - Diocese of Cần Thơ
  - Diocese of Đà Lạt
  - Diocese of Long Xuyên
  - Diocese of Mỹ Tho
  - Diocese of Phan Thiết
  - Diocese of Phú Cường
  - Diocese of Vĩnh Long
  - Diocese of Xuân Lộc

=== Exempt without conference ===
- Apostolic Prefecture of Ulaanbaatar, in and for all (Outer) Mongolia

=== Episcopal Conference of Taiwan (officially Chinese Regional Bishops Conference) ===
Ecclesiastical Province of Taipei, covering Taiwan

- Metropolitan Archdiocese of Taipei
  - Diocese of Hsinchu
  - Diocese of Hwalien (Hualien)
  - Diocese of Kaohsiung
  - Diocese of Kiayi (Chiayi)
  - Diocese of Taichung
  - Diocese of Tainan
  - Apostolic Administration of Kinmen-Matsu

=== Episcopal Conference of China (PR, including Hong Kong; not including Taiwan) ===
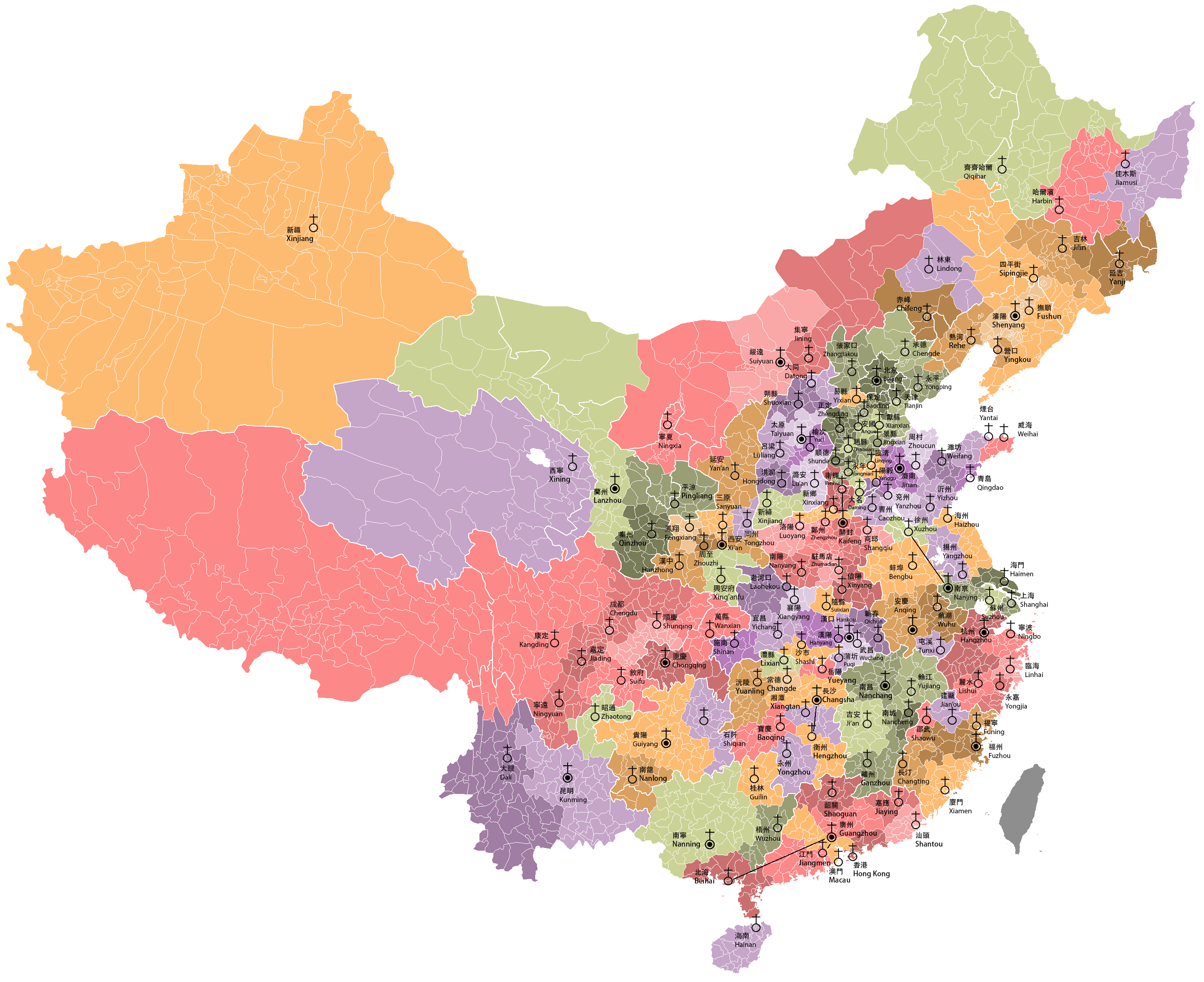
Map of (Roman-rite) Catholic Dioceses in PRC as of February 2025

Exempt, each directly subject to the Holy See, mainly missionary Apostolic prefectures; many are truly vacant or under a temporary Apostolic administrator; no Apostolic Vicariates)

- Diocese of Macau
- Apostolic Prefecture of Baoqing (Paoking/ Shaoyang)
- Apostolic Prefecture of Guilin (Kweilin)
- Apostolic Prefecture of Hainan
- Apostolic Administration of Harbin
- Apostolic Prefecture of Haizhou (Donghai/ Haichow)
- Apostolic Prefecture of Jiamusi (Kiamusze)
- Apostolic Prefecture of Jian’ou (Jianning/ Kienning/ Kienow)
- Apostolic Prefecture of Lindong (Lintung)
- Apostolic Prefecture of Linqing (Lintsing)
- Apostolic Prefecture of Lixian (Lizhou/ Lichow)
- Apostolic Prefecture of Qiqihar (Tsitsikar)
- Apostolic Prefecture of Shaowu
- Apostolic Prefecture of Shashi (Shasi)
- Apostolic Prefecture of Shiqian (Shihtsien)
- Apostolic Prefecture of Suixian (Suihsien)
- Apostolic Prefecture of Tongzhou (Tungchow)
- Apostolic Prefecture of Tunxi (Tunki)
- Apostolic Prefecture of Weihai (Weihaiwei)
- Apostolic Prefecture of Xiangtan (Siangtan)
- Apostolic Prefecture of Xing’anfu (Ankang/ Hinganfu)
- Apostolic Prefecture of Xining (Sining)
- Apostolic Prefecture of Xinjiang (Jiangzhou/ Kiangchow)
- Apostolic Prefecture of Xinjiang-Urumqi (Urumqi/ Sinkiang/ Xinjiang)
- Apostolic Prefecture of Xinxiang (Sinsiang)
- Apostolic Prefecture of Yangzhou (Yangchow)
- Apostolic Prefecture of Yiduxian (Iduhsien)
- Apostolic Prefecture of Yixian (Yihsien)
- Apostolic Prefecture of Yongzhou (Lingling/ Yungchow)
- Apostolic Prefecture of Yueyang (Yuezhou/ Yochow)
- Apostolic Prefecture of Zhaotong (Chaotung)
- Russian Catholic Apostolic Exarchate of Harbin (Byzantine Rite), with former cathedral see in Harbin

Ecclesiastical Province of Anking

- Metropolitan Archdiocese of Anqing 安慶 / Huaining 懷寧 / Huai-ning / Anking
  - Diocese of Bengbu 蚌埠
  - Diocese of Wuhu 蕪湖

Ecclesiastical Province of Peking

- Metropolitan Archdiocese of Beijing 北京 / Peking
  - Diocese of Anguo 安國
  - Diocese of Baoding 保定
  - Diocese of Chengde 承德
  - Diocese of Daming 大名
  - Diocese of Jingxian 景縣
  - Diocese of Shunde 順得
  - Diocese of Tianjin 天津
  - Diocese of Xianxian 獻縣
  - Diocese of Yongnian 永年
  - Diocese of Yongping 永平
  - Diocese of Zhaoxian 趙縣
  - Diocese of Zhangjiakou
  - Diocese of Zhengding 正定

Ecclesiastical Province of Changsha

- Metropolitan Archdiocese of Changsha 長沙/ Changsha
  - Diocese of Changde 常德
  - Diocese of Hengzhou 衡州
  - Diocese of Yuanling 沅陵

Ecclesiastical Province of Chungking

- Metropolitan Archdiocese of Chongqing 重慶/ Chungking
  - Diocese of Chengdu 成都/ Chengtu
  - Diocese of Jiading 嘉定/ Kiating
  - Diocese of Kangding 康定/ Kangting
  - Diocese of Ningyuan 寧遠/ Ningyüan
  - Diocese of Shunqing 順慶/ Shunking
  - Diocese of Suifu 敘府
  - Diocese of Wanxian 萬縣/ Wanhsien

Ecclesiastical Province of Foochow

- Metropolitan Archdiocese of Fuzhou 福州/ Min-Hou/ Minhou 閩侯/ Foochow
  - Diocese of Funing 福寧
  - Diocese of Tingzhou 汀州
  - Diocese of Xiamen 廈門

Ecclesiastical Province of Canton

- Metropolitan Archdiocese of Guangzhou 廣州/ Canton
  - Diocese of Beihai 北海
  - Diocese of Hong Kong 香港
  - Diocese of Jiangmen 江門
  - Diocese of Jiaying 嘉應
  - Diocese of Shantou 汕頭
  - Diocese of Shaozhou 韶州

Ecclesiastical Province of Kweyang

- Metropolitan Archdiocese of Guiyang 貴陽/ Kweyang
  - Diocese of Nanlong 南龍

Ecclesiastical Province of Hangchow

- Metropolitan Archdiocese of Hangzhou 杭州/ Hangchow
  - Diocese of Lishui 麗水
  - Diocese of Ningbo 寧波
  - Diocese of Taizhou 台州
  - Diocese of Yongjia 永嘉

Ecclesiastical Province of Hankow

- Metropolitan Archdiocese of Hankou 漢口/ Hankow
  - Diocese of Hanyang 漢陽
  - Diocese of Laohekou 老河口
  - Diocese of Puqi 蒲圻
  - Diocese of Qizhou 蘄州
  - Diocese of Shinan 施南
  - Diocese of Wuchang 武昌
  - Diocese of Xiangyang 襄陽
  - Diocese of Yichang 宜昌

Ecclesiastical Province of Tsinan

- Metropolitan Archdiocese of Jinan 濟南/ Tsinan
  - Diocese of Caozhou 曹州
  - Diocese of Qingdao 青島
  - Diocese of Yanggu 陽穀
  - Diocese of Yantai 煙台
  - Diocese of Yanzhou 兖州
  - Diocese of Yizhou 沂州
  - Diocese of Zhoucun 周村

Ecclesiastical Province of Kaifeng

- Metropolitan Archdiocese of Kaifeng 開封/ Kaifeng
  - Diocese of Guide 歸德
  - Diocese of Luoyang 洛陽
  - Diocese of Nanyang 南陽
  - Diocese of Weihui 衛輝
  - Diocese of Xinyang 信陽
  - Diocese of Zhengzhou 鄭州
  - Diocese of Zhumadian 駐馬店

Ecclesiastical Province of Kunming

- Metropolitan Archdiocese of Kunming 昆明/ Kunming
  - Diocese of Dali 大理

Ecclesiastical Province of Lanchow

- Metropolitan Archdiocese of Lanzhou 蘭州/ Kao-Lan/ Gaolan 皋蘭/ Lanchow
  - Diocese of Pingliang 平涼
  - Diocese of Qinzhou 秦州

Ecclesiastical Province of Nanchang

- Metropolitan Archdiocese of Nanchang 南昌/ Nanchang
  - Diocese of Ganzhou 贛州
  - Diocese of Ji’an 吉安
  - Diocese of Nancheng 南城
  - Diocese of Yujiang 餘江

Ecclesiastical Province of Nanking

- Metropolitan Archdiocese of Nanjing 南京/ Nanking
  - Diocese of Haimen
  - Diocese of Shanghai
  - Diocese of Suzhou
  - Diocese of Xuzhou

Ecclesiastical Province of Nanning

- Metropolitan Archdiocese of Nanning 南寧/ Nanning
  - Diocese of Wuzhou 梧州

Ecclesiastical Province of Mukden

- Metropolitan Archdiocese of Shenyang 瀋陽/ Fengtian 奉天/ Fengtien/ Mukden
  - Diocese of Chifeng 赤峰
  - Diocese of Fushun 撫順
  - Diocese of Jilin 吉林
  - Diocese of Jehol 熱河
  - Diocese of Sipingjie 四平街
  - Diocese of Yanji 延吉
  - Diocese of Yingkou 營口

Ecclesiastical Province of Hohhot

- Metropolitan Archdiocese of Suiyuan 綏遠/ Suiyüan/ Hohhot 呼和浩特
  - Diocese of Jining 集寧
  - Diocese of Ningxia 寧夏

Ecclesiastical Province of Taiyuan

- Metropolitan Archdiocese of Taiyuan 太原/ Taiyüan
  - Diocese of Datong 大同
  - Diocese of Fenyang 汾陽
  - Diocese of Hongdong 洪洞
  - Diocese of Lu’an 潞安
  - Diocese of Shuozhou 朔州
  - Diocese of Yuci 榆次

Ecclesiastical Province of Sian

- Metropolitan Archdiocese of Xi’an 西安 / Chang-An/ Chang’an 長安/ Sian
  - Diocese of Fengxiang 鳳翔
  - Diocese of Hanzhong 漢中
  - Diocese of Sanyuan 三原
  - Diocese of Yan’an 延安
  - Diocese of Zhouzhi 盩厔

=== Episcopal Conference of Japan ===
Exempt - the Personal Ordinariate of Our Lady of the Southern Cross (for former Anglicans in Australia and Japan) has its see in Australia.

Ecclesiastical Province of Nagasaki

- Metropolitan Archdiocese of Nagasaki 長崎
  - Diocese of Fukuoka 福岡
  - Diocese of Kagoshima 鹿児島
  - Diocese of Naha 那覇
  - Diocese of Oita 大分

Ecclesiastical Province of Osaka

- Metropolitan Archdiocese of Osaka-Takamatsu 大阪高松
  - Diocese of Hiroshima 広島
  - Diocese of Kyoto 京都
  - Diocese of Nagoya 名古屋

Ecclesiastical Province of Tokyo

- Metropolitan Archdiocese of Tokyo 東京
  - Diocese of Niigata 新潟
  - Diocese of Saitama さいたま
  - Diocese of Sapporo 札幌
  - Diocese of Sendai 仙台
  - Diocese of Yokohama 横浜

=== Episcopal Conference of Korea (North and South) ===
exempt, immediately subject to the Holy See

- Military Ordinariate of South Korea
- Territorial Abbacy of Tŏkwon (alias Tŏkugen abbey, with a cathedral see)

Ecclesiastical Province of Kwanju (Gwangju), in South Korea

- Metropolitan Archdiocese of Kwangju (Gwanju)
  - Diocese of Cheju (Jeju)
  - Diocese of Jeonju (Chŏnju)

Ecclesiastical Province of Seoul, including North Korea

- Metropolitan Archdiocese of Seoul (also partially in North Korea)
  - Diocese of Ch’unch’on (Chuncheon/ Chunchon) (also partially in North Korea)
  - Diocese of Daejeon (Taejŏn)
  - Diocese of Hamhung (Hamhŭng) (in North Korea)
  - Diocese of Incheon (Inch’ŏn)
  - Diocese of Pyongyang (P’yŏng-yang) (in North Korea)
  - Diocese of Suwon
  - Diocese of Uijeongbu (Uijongbu) (also partially in North Korea)
  - Diocese of Wonju

Ecclesiastical Province of Taegu, in South Korea

- Metropolitan Archdiocese of Taegu (Daegu)
  - Diocese of Andong
  - Diocese of Cheongju (Ch’ŏngju)
  - Diocese of Masan
  - Diocese of Pusan (Busan)

== Oceania (Latin and Eastern Churches) ==
=== Episcopal Conference of Australia ===
Exempt (arch)dioceses (immediately subject to Rome, no province)

- Military Ordinariate of Australia, for the armed forces
- Archdiocese of Hobart, covering Tasmania
- Archdiocese of Canberra and Goulburn, covering the federal district Canberra and adjacent part of New South Wales
- Personal Ordinariate of Our Lady of the Southern Cross, with see in Maylands, Western Australia (for former Anglicans in Australia and Japan)

Ecclesiastical Province of Adelaide

- Metropolitan Archdiocese of Adelaide, in South Australia
  - Diocese of Darwin, covering the Northern Territory
  - Diocese of Port Pirie, in South Australia

Ecclesiastical Province of Brisbane, covering Queensland

- Metropolitan Archdiocese of Brisbane
  - Diocese of Cairns
  - Diocese of Rockhampton
  - Diocese of Toowoomba
  - Diocese of Townsville

Ecclesiastical Province of Melbourne, covering Victoria state

- Metropolitan Archdiocese of Melbourne
  - Diocese of Ballarat
  - Diocese of Sale
  - Diocese of Sandhurst
  - Ukrainian Catholic Diocese of Saints Peter and Paul of Melbourne, a Ukrainian Catholic Church Byzantine Rite Eparchy (Diocese), with cathedral see in North Melbourne, in and for all Australia, also covering New Zealand and further Oceania

Ecclesiastical Province of Perth, covering Western Australia

- Metropolitan Archdiocese of Perth, also includes both Australian Indian Ocean Territories: Cocos (Keeling) Islands and Christmas Island
  - Diocese of Broome
  - Diocese of Bunbury
  - Diocese of Geraldton

Ecclesiastical Province of Sydney, covering most of New South Wales

- Metropolitan Archdiocese of Sydney
  - Diocese of Armidale
  - Diocese of Bathurst (in Australia)
  - Diocese of Broken Bay
  - Diocese of Lismore
  - Diocese of Maitland-Newcastle
  - Diocese of Parramatta
  - Diocese of Wagga Wagga
  - Diocese of Wilcannia-Forbes
  - Diocese of Wollongong

Other Eastern eparchies (dioceses)

- Maronite Diocese of Saint Maron of Sydney, with cathedral see in Redfern, New South Wales; immediately subject to the Maronite Patriarch of Antioch (in Lebanon; Antiochian Rite)
- Melkite Greek Catholic Eparchy of Saint Michael Archangel in Sydney, with cathedral see in Darlington, New South Wales; also covers New Zealand; immediately subject to the Melkite Catholic Patriarchate of Antioch (in Syria; Byzantine Rite)
- Chaldean Catholic Diocese of Saint Thomas the Apostle of Sydney, with cathedral see at Bossley Park, New South Wales; also covers New Zealand; immediately subject to the Chaldean Catholic Patriarch of Babylon (in Iraq; Chaldean Rite a.k.a.)
- Syro-Malabar Diocese of Saint Thomas the Apostle of Melbourne, with cathedral see in Melbourne, Victoria; immediately subject to the Major Archbishop of Ernakulam–Angamaly (in India; also Syro-Oriental Rite)

=== Episcopal Conference of New Zealand ===
See under § Episcopal Conference of Australia for the Chaldean Catholic, Melkite and Ukrainian Catholic dioceses competent for both countries, with sees in Sydney, Melbourne.

- See also the infra-Episcopal Conference of the Pacific §§ Ecclesiastical Province of Samoa-Apia, Ecclesiastical Province of Suva, and Immediately Subject to the Holy See for three island dependencies of New Zealand, being: the diocese of Rarotonga (on the Cook Islands, also covering Niue) and the Mission Sui Iuris of Tokelau, both suffragans of the Metropolitan Archbishop of Suva

Exempt, i.e. immediately subject to the Holy See

- Military Ordinariate of New Zealand, for the armed forces

Ecclesiastical Province of Wellington

- Metropolitan Archdiocese of Wellington
  - Diocese of Auckland
  - Diocese of Christchurch
  - Diocese of Dunedin
  - Diocese of Hamilton, New Zealand
  - Diocese of Palmerston North

=== Episcopal Conference of the Pacific ===
- An exempt diocese, i.e. immediately subject to the Holy See:
  - Diocese of Tonga, on and for all Tonga
- For Ukrainian Catholics, see § Episcopal Conference of Australia, under Melbourne
- The "United States Minor Outlying Islands" (U.S. Minor Islands), such as Wake, Midway, Johnston, which are Unincorporated Territories of the United States, are administered by the Archdiocese for the Military Services of the United States in Washington, D.C.
- The Diocese of Honolulu (on and for Hawaii) is a suffragan diocese in the ecclesiastical Province of San Francisco in California, U.S.

Ecclesiastical Province of Agaña

- Metropolitan Archdiocese of Agaña, on and for Guam (US unincorporated territory)
  - Diocese of Caroline Islands, on the Caroline Islands, for all the Federated States of Micronesia (Micronesia) and Palau
  - Diocese of Chalan Kanoa, on the Northern Mariana Islands and for the Commonwealth of the Northern Mariana Islands (U.S. territory)
  - Apostolic Prefecture of the Marshall Islands, with see at Majuro, on and for the Marshall Islands (republic)

Ecclesiastical Province of Nouméa

- Metropolitan Archdiocese of Nouméa (New Caledonia, French special collectivity)
  - Diocese of Port-Vila, on and for Vanuatu, former New Hebrides
  - Diocese of Wallis et Futuna, with see at Mata-Utu, on and for Wallis et Futuna (French overseas collectivity)

Ecclesiastical Province of Papeete

This province covers all of French Polynesia (French overseas collectivity) and the Pitcairn Islands (UK).

- Metropolitan Archdiocese of Papeete
  - Diocese of Taiohae o Tefenuaenata

Ecclesiastical Province of Samoa-Apia

- Metropolitan Archdiocese of Samoa-Apia, on and for Samoa
  - Diocese of Samoa-Pago Pago, on and for American Samoa (US)
  - Mission Sui Iuris of Tokelau, on and for Tokelau (NZ)

Ecclesiastical Province of Suva

- Metropolitan Archdiocese of Suva, on and for Fiji
  - Diocese of Rarotonga, on the Cook Islands, for those and Niue (both New Zealand-associated countries)
  - Diocese of Tarawa and Nauru, with see at Tarawa on Kiribati (formerly Gilbert Islands), also for Nauru (republic)
  - Mission Sui Iuris of Funafuti, on and for Tuvalu (formerly Ellice Islands)

=== Episcopal Conference of Papua New Guinea and the Solomon Islands ===
Ecclesiastical Province of Madang

- Metropolitan Archdiocese of Madang
  - Diocese of Aitape
  - Diocese of Lae
  - Diocese of Vanimo
  - Diocese of Wewak

Ecclesiastical Province of Mount Hagen

- Metropolitan Archdiocese of Mount Hagen
  - Diocese of Goroka
  - Diocese of Kundiawa
  - Diocese of Mendi
  - Diocese of Wabag

Ecclesiastical Province of Port Moresby

- Metropolitan Archdiocese of Port Moresby
  - Diocese of Alotau-Sideia
  - Diocese of Bereina
  - Diocese of Daru-Kiunga
  - Diocese of Kerema

Ecclesiastical Province of Rabaul

- Metropolitan Archdiocese of Rabaul
  - Diocese of Bougainville
  - Diocese of Kavieng
  - Diocese of Kimbe

Ecclesiastical Province of Honaira, covering the Solomon Islands

- Metropolitan Archdiocese of Honiara
  - Diocese of Auki
  - Diocese of Gizo

== Africa (Latin and Eastern Churches) ==
Symposium of Episcopal Conferences of Africa and Madagascar (S.E.C.A.M.)

Most national churches are also part of an episcopal conference and a regional (subcontinental) group of those, so we list them geographically:

=== Assembly of Catholic Ordinaries of Egypt ===
Latin Church

- Apostolic Vicariate of Alexandria of Egypt

Alexandrian Rite (Coptic originally means Egyptian)

- Coptic Catholic Patriarchate of Alexandria, actually in Cairo, Metropolitan Archbishop of the church's only ecclesiastical province sui juris covering Egypt (which has no other Catholic province), with these suffragan Eparchies:
  - Coptic Catholic Eparchy of Abu Qirqas
  - Coptic Catholic Eparchy of Alexandria
  - Coptic Catholic Eparchy of Assiut
  - Coptic Catholic Eparchy of Guizeh
  - Coptic Catholic Eparchy of Ismaylia
  - Coptic Catholic Eparchy of Luqsor
  - Coptic Catholic Eparchy of Minya
  - Coptic Catholic Eparchy of Sohag

Byzantine Rite

- Melkite Catholic Territory Dependent on the Patriarch of Egypt, Sudan and South Sudan

Antiochian Rite

- Syriac Catholic Eparchy of Cairo

Armenian Rite

- Armenian Catholic Eparchy of Alexandria (Iskanderiya, a suffragan of the Patriarch of Cilicia), also for Sudan

Syro-Oriental Rite

- Chaldean Catholic Eparchy of Cairo

Mostly exempt dioceses, directly subject to the Holy See

- Diocese of Laghouat (1955), in Algeria
- in Morocco:
  - Archdiocese of Rabat (1955) (in Morocco)
  - Archdiocese of Tanger (1956) (in Morocco)
  - For Spanish enclave Ceuta, see Cadiz and Ceuta in Spain (Europe)
- Apostolic Prefecture of Western Sahara, for all Western Sahara
- in Libya:
  - Apostolic Vicariate of Benghazi
  - Apostolic Vicariate of Derna
  - Apostolic Vicariate of Tripoli
  - Apostolic Prefecture of Misurata
- Archdiocese of Tunis (1884), for all Tunisia

Ecclesiastical Province of Alger, covering most of Algeria

- Metropolitan Archdiocese of Alger (1838)
  - Diocese of Constantine (1866)
  - Diocese of Oran (1866)

Regional Episcopal Conference of West Africa (R.E.C.O.W.A.)

The West African subcontinent was previously covered by two language-distinct super-conferences:

=== Episcopal Conference of Nigeria ===
Exempt dioceses, immediately subject to the Holy See

- Maronite Catholic Eparchy of Annunciation of Ibadan (an Antiochian Rite particular church) for the Western and Central African states, with cathedral see Church of Our Lady of the Annunciation, in Ibadan, Oyo State; also Apostolic Visitor in Southern Africa of the Maronites

Ecclesiastical Province of Abuja

- Metropolitan Archdiocese of Abuja (1989)
  - Diocese of Gboko
  - Diocese of Idah
  - Diocese of Katsina-Ala
  - Diocese of Lafia
  - Diocese of Lokoja
  - Diocese of Makurdi
  - Diocese of Otukpo

Ecclesiastical Province of Benin City

- Metropolitan Archdiocese of Benin City (1950)
  - Diocese of Auchi
  - Diocese of Bomadi
  - Diocese of Issele-Uku
  - Diocese of Uromi
  - Diocese of Warri

Ecclesiastical Province of Calabar

- Metropolitan Archdiocese of Calabar (1950)
  - Diocese of Ikot Ekpene
  - Diocese of Ogoja
  - Diocese of Port Harcourt
  - Diocese of Uyo

Ecclesiastical Province of Ibadan

- Metropolitan Archdiocese of Ibadan (1958)
  - Diocese of Ekiti
  - Diocese of Ilorin
  - Diocese of Ondo
  - Diocese of Osogbo
  - Diocese of Oyo

Ecclesiastical Province of Jos

- Metropolitan Archdiocese of Jos (1953)
  - Diocese of Bauchi
  - Diocese of Jalingo
  - Diocese of Maiduguri
  - Diocese of Pankshin
  - Diocese of Shendam
  - Diocese of Yola

Ecclesiastical Province of Kaduna

- Metropolitan Archdiocese of Kaduna (1953)
  - Diocese of Kafanchan
  - Diocese of Kano
  - Diocese of Kontagora
  - Diocese of Minna
  - Diocese of Sokoto
  - Diocese of Zaria

Ecclesiastical Province of Lagos

- Metropolitan Archdiocese of Lagos (1950)
  - Diocese of Abeokuta
  - Diocese of Ijebu-Ode

Ecclesiastical Province of Onitsha

- Metropolitan Archdiocese of Onitsha (1950)
  - Diocese of Abakaliki
  - Diocese of Awgu
  - Diocese of Awka
  - Diocese of Ekwulobia
  - Diocese of Enugu
  - Diocese of Nnewi
  - Diocese of Nsukka

Ecclesiastical Province of Owerri

- Metropolitan Archdiocese of Owerri (1950)
  - Diocese of Aba
  - Diocese of Ahiara
  - Diocese of Okigwe
  - Diocese of Orlu
  - Diocese of Umuahia

=== Episcopal Conference of Gambia and Sierra Leone ===
Exempt, immediately subject to the Holy See

- Diocese of Banjul (1957), in and for all the Gambia

Ecclesiastical Province of Freetown, covering Sierra Leone

- Metropolitan Archdiocese of Freetown (1950)
  - Diocese of Bo (2011)
  - Diocese of Kenema (1970)
  - Diocese of Makeni (1962)

=== Episcopal Conference of Ghana ===
Exempt, i.e. directly subject to the Holy See

- Apostolic Vicariate of Donkorkrom

Ecclesiastical Province of Accra

- Metropolitan Archdiocese of Accra (1950)
  - Diocese of Ho
  - Diocese of Jasikan
  - Diocese of Keta-Akatsi
  - Diocese of Koforidua

Ecclesiastical Province of Cape Coast

- Metropolitan Archdiocese of Cape Coast (1950)
  - Diocese of Sekondi-Takoradi
  - Diocese of Wiawso

Ecclesiastical Province of Kumasi

- Metropolitan Archdiocese of Kumasi (1950)
  - Diocese of Goaso
  - Diocese of Konongo-Mampong
  - Diocese of Obuasi
  - Diocese of Sunyani
  - Diocese of Techiman

Ecclesiastical Province of Tamale

- Metropolitan Archdiocese of Tamale (1950)
  - Diocese of Damongo
  - Diocese of Navrongo-Bolgatanga
  - Diocese of Wa
  - Diocese of Yendi

=== Episcopal Conference of Liberia ===
Ecclesiastical Province of Monrovia

- Metropolitan Archdiocese of Monrovia (1981)
  - Diocese of Cape Palmas
  - Diocese of Gbarnga

=== Episcopal Conference of Benin ===
Ecclesiastical Province of Cotonou

- Metropolitan Archdiocese of Cotonou
  - Diocese of Abomey
  - Diocese of Dassa-Zoumé
  - Diocese of Lokossa
  - Diocese of Porto-Novo

Ecclesiastical Province of Parakou

- Metropolitan Archdiocese of Parakou
  - Diocese of Djougou
  - Diocese of Kandi
  - Diocese of Natitingou
  - Diocese of N'Dali

=== Ecclesiastical Conference of Burkina Faso and Niger ===
Ecclesiastical Province of Bobo-Dioulasso, in Burkina Faso

- Metropolitan Archdiocese of Bobo-Dioulasso (1955)
  - Diocese of Banfora (1998)
  - Diocese of Dédougou (2000)
  - Diocese of Diébougou (1968)
  - Diocese of Gaoua (2011)
  - Diocese of Nouna (1955)

Ecclesiastical Province of Koupéla, in Burkina Faso

- Metropolitan Archdiocese of Koupéla (1956)
  - Diocese of Dori
  - Diocese of Fada N’Gourma
  - Diocese of Kaya
  - Diocese of Tenkodogo

Ecclesiastical Province of Ouagadougou, in Burkina Faso

- Metropolitan Archdiocese of Ouagadougou (1955)
  - Diocese of Koudougou
  - Diocese of Manga
  - Diocese of Ouahigouya

Ecclesiastical Province of Niamey, covering Niger

- Metropolitan Archdiocese of Niamey (1961)
  - Diocese of Maradi

=== Episcopal Conference of Ivory Coast ===
Ecclesiastical Province of Abidjan

- Metropolitan Archdiocese of Abidjan (1955)
  - Diocese of Agboville
  - Diocese of Grand-Bassam
  - Diocese of Yopougon

Ecclesiastical Province of Bouaké

- Metropolitan Archdiocese of Bouaké (1955)
  - Diocese of Abengourou
  - Diocese of Bondoukou
  - Diocese of Yamoussoukro

Ecclesiastical Province of Gagnoa

- Metropolitan Archdiocese of Gagnoa (1956)
  - Diocese of Daloa
  - Diocese of Man
  - Diocese of San-Pédro

Ecclesiastical Province of Korhogo

- Metropolitan Archdiocese of Korhogo (1955)
  - Diocese of Katiola
  - Diocese of Odienné

=== Episcopal Conference of Guinea ===
Ecclesiastical Province of Conakry, covering Guinea

- Metropolitan Archdiocese of Conakry (1955)
  - Diocese of Kankan
  - Diocese of N’Zérékoré

=== Episcopal Conference of Mali ===
Ecclesiastical Province of Bamako, covering Mali

- Metropolitan Archdiocese of Bamako (1955)
  - Diocese of Kayes
  - Diocese of Mopti
  - Diocese of San
  - Diocese of Ségou
  - Diocese of Sikasso

=== Episcopal Conference of Togo ===
Ecclesiastical Province of Lomé, covering Togo

- Metropolitan Archdiocese of Lomé
  - Diocese of Aného
  - Diocese of Atakpamé
  - Diocese of Dapaong
  - Diocese of Kara
  - Diocese of Kpalimé
  - Diocese of Sokodé

=== Episcopal Conference of Senegal, Cape Verde, Mauritania and Guinée-Bissau ===
Ecclesiastical Province of Dakar, covering Senegal

- Metropolitan Archdiocese of Dakar
  - Diocese of Kaolack
  - Diocese of Kolda
  - Diocese of Saint-Louis du Sénégal
  - Diocese of Tambacounda
  - Diocese of Thiès
  - Diocese of Ziguinchor

neither of the above West African super-conferences however covered the dioceses, all directly subject to the Holy See, in three countries formerly under Portuguese or (Franco-)Spanish colonial administration, now participating in the same ecclesiastical conference as ex-French Senegal

- one exempt dioceses, covering Mauritania:
  - Diocese of Nouakchott
- two exempt dioceses, covering Cape Verde:
  - Diocese of Santiago de Cabo Verde
  - Diocese of Mindelo
- two exempt dioceses, covering Guinea-Bissau:
  - Diocese of Bissau
  - Diocese of Bafatá

two exempt members (no ecclesiastical province, directly subject to the Holy See) of the Episcopal conference of the Arab region Latin bishops, see Asia:

- Diocese of Djibouti, for all Djibouti
- Diocese of Mogadiscio, for all Somalia

=== Episcopal Conference of Ethiopia and Eritrea ===
Neither country has or is part of any Latin Church province.

Eritrea has no Latin hierarchy, even the post of Apostolic nuncio is held by the nuncio to Sudan in Khartoum.

Ethiopia has the following exempt apostolic vicariates and apostolic prefecture, each immediately subject to the Holy See

- Apostolic Vicariate of Awasa
- Apostolic Vicariate of Gambella
- Apostolic Vicariate of Harar
- Apostolic Vicariate of Hosanna
- Apostolic Vicariate of Jimma-Bonga, at Jimma
- Apostolic Vicariate of Meki
- Apostolic Vicariate of Nekemte
- Apostolic Vicariate of Soddo
- Apostolic Prefecture of Robe

==== Eastern Alexandrian rite particular churches (Metropolitanates sui juris) ====
However, each country has an Alexandrian rite (like the Egyptian Copts, but in Geez language) Metropolitan particular church 'sui iuris', whose episcopates fully parttake in the joint Episcopal Conference, yet also has its own council of bishops

Ecclesiastical Province of Addis Abeba (Ethiopia, sui iuris)

- Ethiopian Catholic Archeparchy of Addis Abeba, the Metropolitan Archdiocese, with three suffragans Eparchies (dioceses)
  - Ethiopian Catholic Eparchy of Adigrat
  - Ethiopian Catholic Eparchy of Bahir Dar–Dessie
  - Ethiopian Catholic Eparchy of Emdeber

Ecclesiastical Province of Asmara (Eritrea, sui iuris)

- Eritrean Catholic Archeparchy of Asmara, the Metropolitan Archdiocese, with three suffragans Eparchies (dioceses)
  - Eritrean Catholic Eparchy of Barentu
  - Eritrean Catholic Eparchy of Keren
  - Eritrean Catholic Eparchy of Segheneyti

=== Episcopal Conference of Kenya ===
Exempt, i.e. directly subject to the Holy See

- Military Ordinariate of Kenya
- Apostolic Vicariate of Isiolo

Ecclesiastical Province of Kisumu

- Metropolitan Archdiocese of Kisumu
  - Diocese of Bungoma
  - Diocese of Eldoret
  - Diocese of Homa Bay
  - Diocese of Kakamega
  - Diocese of Kapsabet
  - Diocese of Kisii
  - Diocese of Kitale
  - Diocese of Lodwar

Ecclesiastical Province of Mombasa

- Metropolitan Archdiocese of Mombasa
  - Diocese of Garissa
  - Diocese of Malindi

Ecclesiastical Province of Nairobi

- Metropolitan Archdiocese of Nairobi
  - Diocese of Kericho
  - Diocese of Kitui
  - Diocese of Machakos
  - Diocese of Nakuru
  - Diocese of Ngong

Ecclesiastical Province of Nyeri

- Metropolitan Archdiocese of Nyeri
  - Diocese of Embu
  - Diocese of Maralal
  - Diocese of Marsabit
  - Diocese of Meru
  - Diocese of Muranga
  - Diocese of Nyahururu

=== Episcopal Conference of Malawi ===
Ecclesiastical Province of Blantyre

- Metropolitan Archdiocese of Blantyre
  - Diocese of Chikwawa
  - Diocese of Mangochi
  - Diocese of Zomba

Ecclesiastical Province of Lilongwe

- Metropolitan Archdiocese of Lilongwe
  - Diocese of Dedza
  - Diocese of Karonga
  - Diocese of Mzuzu

=== Episcopal Conference of Sudan & South Sudan ===
Ecclesiastical Province of Juba, covering the Latin Church in South Sudan

- Metropolitan Archdiocese of Juba
  - Diocese of Malakal
  - Diocese of Rumbek
  - Diocese of Tombura-Yambio
  - Diocese of Torit
  - Diocese of Wau
  - Diocese of Yei

Ecclesiastical Province of Khartoum, covering the Latin Church in Sudan

- Metropolitan Archdiocese of Khartoum
  - Diocese of El Obeid

Eastern church jurisdictions, covering both countries

- Melkite Territory Dependent on the Patriarch of Egypt, Sudan and South Sudan (Greek-language Byzantine Rite), with cathedrals in Cairo and Alexandria
- Syriac Territory Dependent on the Patriarch of Sudan and South Sudan (Antiochian rite; no see here, but vested in the Syriac bishop of Cairo (in Egypt, immediately subject to the Patriarch of Antioch)

For the Armenian Catholics in Sudan, see Egypt
Armenian Catholic Eparchy of Iskanderiya (Alexandria, a suffragan of the Patriarch of Cilicia)

=== Episcopal Conference of Tanzania ===
Ecclesiastical Province of Arusha

- Archdiocese of Arusha
  - Diocese of Mbulu
  - Diocese of Moshi
  - Diocese of Same

Ecclesiastical Province of Dar-es-Salaam

- Archdiocese of Dar-es-Salaam
  - Diocese of Ifakara
  - Diocese of Mahenge
  - Diocese of Morogoro
  - Diocese of Tanga
  - Diocese of Zanzibar

Ecclesiastical Province of Dodoma

- Archdiocese of Dodoma
  - Diocese of Kondoa
  - Diocese of Singida

Ecclesiastical Province of Mbeya

- Archdiocese of Mbeya
  - Diocese of Iringa
  - Diocese of Sumbawanga

Ecclesiastical Province of Mwanza

- Archdiocese of Mwanza
  - Diocese of Bukoba
  - Diocese of Bunda
  - Diocese of Geita
  - Diocese of Kayanga
  - Diocese of Musoma
  - Diocese of Rulenge–Ngara
  - Diocese of Shinyanga

Ecclesiastical Province of Songea

- Archdiocese of Songea
  - Diocese of Lindi
  - Diocese of Mbinga
  - Diocese of Mtwara
  - Diocese of Njombe
  - Diocese of Tunduru-Masasi

Ecclesiastical Province of Tabora

- Archdiocese of Tabora
  - Diocese of Kahama
  - Diocese of Kigoma
  - Diocese of Mpanda

=== Episcopal Conference of Uganda ===
Exempt diocese, immediately subject to the Holy See

- Military Ordinariate of Uganda

Ecclesiastical Province of Gulu

- Metropolitan Archdiocese of Gulu
  - Diocese of Arua
  - Diocese of Lira
  - Diocese of Nebbi

Ecclesiastical Province of Kampala

- Metropolitan Archdiocese of Kampala
  - Diocese of Kasana–Luweero
  - Diocese of Kiyinda–Mityana
  - Diocese of Lugazi
  - Diocese of Masaka

Ecclesiastical Province of Mbarara

- Metropolitan Archdiocese of Mbarara
  - Diocese of Fort Portal
  - Diocese of Hoima
  - Diocese of Kabale
  - Diocese of Kasese

Ecclesiastical Province of Tororo

- Metropolitan Archdiocese of Tororo
  - Diocese of Jinja
  - Diocese of Kotido
  - Diocese of Moroto
  - Diocese of Soroti

=== Episcopal Conference of Zambia ===
Ecclesiastical Province of Kasama

- Metropolitan Archdiocese of Kasama
  - Diocese of Mansa
  - Diocese of Mpika

Ecclesiastical Province of Lusaka

- Metropolitan Archdiocese of Lusaka
  - Diocese of Chipata
  - Diocese of Kabwe
  - Diocese of Livingstone
  - Diocese of Mongu
  - Diocese of Monze
  - Diocese of Ndola
  - Diocese of Solwezi

(?only Latin dioceses) This subcontinent is still covered by two distinct super-conferences:

- Association of Episcopal Conferences of Central Africa, covering the three countries formerly under Belgian colonial administration: Congo, Burundi and Rwanda

=== Ecclesiastical Conference of Burundi ===
Ecclesiastical Province of Bujumbura

- Metropolitan Archdiocese of Bujumbura
  - Diocese of Bubanza
  - Diocese of Bururi

Ecclesiastical Province of Gitega

- Metropolitan Archdiocese of Gitega
  - Diocese of Muyinga
  - Diocese of Ngozi
  - Diocese of Rutana
  - Diocese of Ruyigi

=== Episcopal Conference of the Congo (-Kinshasa, Democratic Republic of the Congo, ex-Zaire) ===
Ecclesiastical Province of Bukavu

- Metropolitan Archdiocese of Bukavu
  - Diocese of Butembo-Beni
  - Diocese of Goma
  - Diocese of Kasongo
  - Diocese of Kindu
  - Diocese of Uvira

Ecclesiastical Province of Kananga

- Metropolitan Archdiocese of Kananga
  - Diocese of Kabinda
  - Diocese of Kole
  - Diocese of Luebo
  - Diocese of Luiza
  - Diocese of Mbujimayi
  - Diocese of Mweka
  - Diocese of Tshumbe

Ecclesiastical Province of Kinshasa

- Metropolitan Archdiocese of Kinshasa
  - Diocese of Boma
  - Diocese of Idiofa
  - Diocese of Inongo
  - Diocese of Kenge
  - Diocese of Kikwit
  - Diocese of Kisantu
  - Diocese of Matadi
  - Diocese of Popokabaka

Ecclesiastical Province of Kisangani

- Metropolitan Archdiocese of Kisangani
  - Diocese of Bondo
  - Diocese of Bunia
  - Diocese of Buta
  - Diocese of Doruma-Dungu
  - Diocese of Isangi
  - Diocese of Isiro-Niangara
  - Diocese of Mahagi-Nioka
  - Diocese of Wamba

Ecclesiastical Province of Lubumbashi

- Metropolitan Archdiocese of Lubumbashi
  - Diocese of Kalemie-Kirungu
  - Diocese of Kamina
  - Diocese of Kilwa-Kasenga
  - Diocese of Kolwezi
  - Diocese of Kongolo
  - Diocese of Manono
  - Diocese of Sakania-Kipushi

Ecclesiastical Province of Mbandaka-Bikoro

- Metropolitan Archdiocese of Mbandaka-Bikoro
  - Diocese of Basankusu
  - Diocese of Bokungu-Ikela
  - Diocese of Budjala
  - Diocese of Lisala
  - Diocese of Lolo
  - Diocese of Molegbe

=== Episcopal Conference of Rwanda ===
Ecclesiastical Province of Kigali, covering Rwanda

- Metropolitan Archdiocese of Kigali
  - Diocese of Butare
  - Diocese of Byumba
  - Diocese of Cyangugu
  - Diocese of Gikongoro
  - Diocese of Kabgayi
  - Diocese of Kibungo
  - Diocese of Nyundo
  - Diocese of Ruhengeri
- Association of Episcopal Conferences of the Central Africa Region, covering countries formerly under French or Spanish colonial administration

=== Ecclesiastical Conference of Cameroon ===
Ecclesiastical Province of Bamenda

- Metropolitan Archdiocese of Bamenda
  - Diocese of Buéa
  - Diocese of Kumba
  - Diocese of Kumbo
  - Diocese of Mamfe

Ecclesiastical Province of Bertoua

- Metropolitan Archdiocese of Bertoua
  - Diocese of Batouri
  - Diocese of Doumé–Abong’ Mbang
  - Diocese of Yokadouma

Ecclesiastical Province of Douala

- Metropolitan Archdiocese of Douala
  - Diocese of Bafang
  - Diocese of Bafoussam
  - Diocese of Edéa
  - Diocese of Eséka
  - Diocese of Nkongsamba

Ecclesiastical Province of Garoua

- Metropolitan Archdiocese of Garoua
  - Diocese of Maroua-Mokolo
  - Diocese of Ngaoundéré
  - Diocese of Yagoua

Ecclesiastical Province of Yaoundé

- Metropolitan Archdiocese of Yaoundé
  - Diocese of Bafia
  - Diocese of Ebolowa
  - Diocese of Kribi
  - Diocese of Mbalmayo
  - Diocese of Obala
  - Diocese of Sangmélima

=== Episcopal Conference of the Central African Republic ===
Ecclesiastical Province of Bangui, covering the Central African republic

- Metropolitan Archdiocese of Bangui
  - Diocese of Alindao
  - Diocese of Bambari
  - Diocese of Bangassou
  - Diocese of Kaga-Bandoro
- Metropolitan Archdiocese of Berbérati
  - Diocese of Bossangoa
  - Diocese of Bouar
  - Diocese of Mbaïki

=== Episcopal Conference of Chad ===
Exempt, immediately subject to the Holy See

- Apostolic Vicariate of Mongo

Ecclesiastical Province of N'Djamena

- Metropolitan Archdiocese of N'Djamena
  - Diocese of Doba
  - Diocese of Goré
  - Diocese of Lai
  - Diocese of Moundou
  - Diocese of Pala
  - Diocese of Sarh

=== Episcopal Conference of the Congo (Brazzaville) ===
Ecclesiastical Province of Brazzaville

- Metropolitan Archdiocese of Brazzaville
  - Diocese of Gamboma
  - Diocese of Kinkala

Ecclesiastical Province of Owando

- Metropolitan Archdiocese of Owando
  - Diocese of Impfondo
  - Diocese of Ouesso

Ecclesiastical Province of Pointe-Noire

- Metropolitan Archdiocese of Pointe-Noire
  - Diocese of Dolisie
  - Diocese of Nkayi

=== Episcopal Conference of Equatorial Guinea ===
Ecclesiastical Province of Malabo

- Metropolitan Archdiocese of Malabo
  - Diocese of Bata
  - Diocese of Ebebiyin
  - Diocese of Evinayong
  - Diocese of Mongomo

=== Episcopal Conference of Gabon ===
Exempt missionary circonscription, directly subject to the Holy See

- Apostolic Vicariate of Makokou

Ecclesiastical Province of Libreville, covering the rest of Gabon

- Metropolitan Archdiocese of Libreville
  - Diocese of Franceville
  - Diocese of Mouila
  - Diocese of Oyem
  - Diocese of Port-Gentil

=== Episcopal Conference of Angola and São Tomé e Principe ===
Exempt, directly subject to the Holy See

- Diocese of São Tomé and Príncipe (1534)

Ecclesiastical Province of Huambo

- Metropolitan Archdiocese of Huambo (1940)
  - Diocese of Benguela
  - Diocese of Kwito-Bié

Ecclesiastical Province of Luanda

- Metropolitan Archdiocese of Luanda (1596)
  - Diocese of Cabinda
  - Diocese of Caxito
  - Diocese of Mbanza Congo
  - Diocese of Sumbe
  - Diocese of Viana

Ecclesiastical Province of Lubango

- Metropolitan Archdiocese of Lubango (1955)
  - Diocese of Menongue
  - Diocese of Namibe
  - Diocese of Ondjiva

Ecclesiastical Province of Malanje

- Metropolitan Archdiocese of Malanje (1957)
  - Diocese of Ndalatando
  - Diocese of Uije

Ecclesiastical Province of Saurímo

- Metropolitan Archdiocese of Saurímo (1975)
  - Diocese of Dundo
  - Diocese of Lwena

=== Episcopal Conference of the Indian Ocean (minor African East coast island states) ===
Only exempt dioceses, each for a whole country (or two) without national conference, directly subject to the Holy See

- in Mauritius :
  - Diocese of Port-Louis (1847) on Mauritius (also covers the British Indian Ocean Territory)
  - Apostolic Vicariate of Rodrigues, covering part of Mauritius
- Diocese of Port Victoria o Seychelles (1892) for the Seychelles
- Diocese of Saint-Denis-de-La Réunion (1850), for the French territory Réunion
- Apostolic Vicariate of Archipel des Comores for the Comoros and Mayotte

=== Episcopal Conference of Lesotho ===
Ecclesiastical Province of Maseru

- Metropolitan Archdiocese of Maseru
  - Diocese of Leribe
  - Diocese of Mohale's Hoek
  - Diocese of Qacha's Nek

=== Episcopal Conference of Madagascar ===
Ecclesiastical Province of Antananarivo

- Metropolitan Archdiocese of Antananarivo (1955)
  - Diocese of Antsirabe
  - Diocese of Maintirano
  - Diocese of Miarinarivo
  - Diocese of Tsiroanomandidy

Ecclesiastical Province of Antsiranana

- Metropolitan Archdiocese of Antsiranana
  - Diocese of Ambanja
  - Diocese of Mahajanga
  - Diocese of Port-Bergé

Ecclesiastical Province of Toamasina

- Metropolitan Archdiocese of Toamasina
  - Diocese of Ambatondrazaka
  - Diocese of Fenoarivo Atsinanana
  - Diocese of Moramanga

Ecclesiastical Province of Fianarantsoa

- Metropolitan Archdiocese of Fianarantsoa
  - Diocese of Ambositra
  - Diocese of Farafangana
  - Diocese of Ihosy
  - Diocese of Mananjary

Ecclesiastical Province of Toliara

- Metropolitan Archdiocese of Toliara
  - Diocese of Morombe
  - Diocese of Morondava
  - Diocese of Tôlagnaro

=== Episcopal Conference of Mozambique ===
Ecclesiastical Province of Beira

- Metropolitan Archdiocese of Beira (1940)
  - Diocese of Chimoio
  - Diocese of Quelimane
  - Diocese of Tete

Ecclesiastical Province of Maputo

- Metropolitan Archdiocese of Maputo (1940)
  - Diocese of Inhambane
  - Diocese of Xai-Xai

Ecclesiastical Province of Nampula

- Metropolitan Archdiocese of Nampula (1940)
  - Diocese of Gurué
  - Diocese of Lichinga
  - Diocese of Nacala
  - Diocese of Pemba

=== Episcopal Conference of Namibia ===
Ecclesiastical Province of Windhoek, covering Namibia

- Metropolitan Archdiocese of Windhoek
  - Diocese of Keetmanshoop
  - Apostolic Vicariate of Rundu (not exempt)

=== Episcopal Conference of South Africa, Botswana and Eswatini ===
covers the dioceses in the republic of South Africa, and two neighbouring countries whose only dioceses belong to its provinces Botswana and Eswatini

- The wider Inter-Regional Meeting of Bishops of Southern Africa (I.M.B.I.S.A.) also includes Angola and São Tomé and Príncipe, Lesotho, Mozambique, Namibia, Zimbabwe

Exempt, immediately subject to the Holy See:

- Military Ordinariate of South Africa
- Apostolic Vicariate of Ingwavuma

Ecclesiastical Province of Bloemfontein

- Metropolitan Archdiocese of Bloemfontein (1951)
  - Diocese of Bethlehem
  - Diocese of Keimoes-Upington
  - Diocese of Kimberley
  - Diocese of Kroonstad

Ecclesiastical Province of Cape Town

- Metropolitan Archdiocese of Cape Town (1951)
  - Diocese of Aliwal
  - Diocese of De Aar
  - Diocese of Oudtshoorn
  - Diocese of Port Elizabeth
  - Diocese of Queenstown

Ecclesiastical Province of Durban

- Metropolitan Archdiocese of Durban (1951)
  - Diocese of Dundee
  - Diocese of Eshowe
  - Diocese of Kokstad
  - Diocese of Mariannhill
  - Diocese of Umtata
  - Diocese of Umzimkulu

Ecclesiastical Province of Johannesburg

- Metropolitan Archdiocese of Johannesburg (1951)
  - Diocese of Klerksdorp
  - Diocese of Witbank
- the province of Johannesburg also includes the only diocese in Swaziland:
  - Diocese of Manzini (1951)

Ecclesiastical Province of Pretoria

- Metropolitan Archdiocese of Pretoria (1951)
  - Diocese of Pietersburg
  - Diocese of Rustenburg (1971)
  - Diocese of Tzaneen
- the province of Pretoria also includes both dioceses in Botswana:
  - Diocese of Francistown (2017)
  - Diocese of Gaborone (1966)

=== Episcopal Conference of Zimbabwe ===
Ecclesiastical Province of Bulawayo

- Metropolitan Archdiocese of Bulawayo
  - Diocese of Gweru
  - Diocese of Hwange
  - Diocese of Masvingo

Ecclesiastical Province of Harare

- Metropolitan Archdiocese of Harare
  - Diocese of Chinhoyi
  - Diocese of Gokwe
  - Diocese of Mutare

== Eastern Catholic Churches by Rite ==
The 23 Eastern Catholic Churches retain many Orthodox traditions, even in the hierarchic terminology, such as calling dioceses Eparchies and archdioceses Archeparchies.

Their respective diocesan structures overlap with and are partially parallel to each other, to the Latin Church, often 'sharing' a see. In addition, exempt, mixed ordinariates for the Eastern churches without dioceses of their own are established in a few (European and Latin American) countries, directly subject to the Holy See.

They are presented grouped per ancient rite, or liturgical tradition. Following the name of each Church is given the nature of their ecclesiastical polity; for instance, whether it is headed by a Patriarch, a Major Archbishop, a Metropolitan Archbishop, or has no unified structure and is instead composed of jurisdictions each individually subject to the Holy See.

=== Exempt, joint ordinariates for all the Eastern faithful ===
- Ordinariate for Eastern Catholics in Argentina, for all Eastern Churches, vested in the Latin Church Metropolitan Archbishop of capital Buenos Aires
- Ordinariate for Eastern Catholics in Brazil, for all Eastern Churches, cumulated with varying Latin Church Metropolitan sees
- Ordinariate for Eastern Catholics in France, for all Eastern Churches, vested in the Latin Church Metropolitan Archbishop of capital Paris
- Ordinariate for Eastern Catholics in Poland, for all Eastern Churches, vested in the Latin Church Metropolitan Archbishop of capital Warszaw
- Ordinariate for Eastern Catholics in Spain, for all Eastern Churches, vested in the Latin Church Metropolitan Archbishop of Madrid

=== Byzantine Rite churches ===
==== Exempt, joint Ordinariates or Administrations for the Byzantine Rites faithful ====
- Ordinariate for Byzantine-rite Catholics in Austria, vested in the (Latin Church) Metropolitan Archbishop of capital Vienna, for Byzantine Rite Eastern Catholic churches
- Apostolic Administration of Kazakhstan and Central Asia for Faithful of Byzantine Rite, in Karaganda, for Kazakhstan, Kyrgyzstan, Tajikistan, Turkmenistan and Uzbekistan

==== (Greek-)Melkite Catholic Church (Patriarchal) ====
In the Arab World and Africa, the church has dioceses in:

- Egypt, Sudan and South Sudan:
  - Melkite Patriarchal Dependent Territory of Egypt, Sudan, and South Sudan, administered by a Patriarchal Vicar or Protosyncellus, with cathedrals in Cairo (episcopal see) and Alexandria (Ancient Patriarchal see), titular Archeparchy of Alexandria.
- The Holy Land, where the Patriarch of Antioch has the style of Titular Patriarch of Jerusalem:
  - Israel: Melkite Greek Catholic Archeparchy of Akka (including Haifa, Nazareth and all Galilee)
  - Palestinian territories: Melkite Greek Catholic Archeparchy of Jerusalem of the Melkites (a patriarchal vicariate)
  - (Trans)Jordan: Melkite Greek Catholic Archeparchy of Petra and Philadelphia in Amman and all Transjordan
- Iraq:
  - Melkite Greek Catholic Patriarchal Exarchate of Iraq
- Arabian Peninsula:
  - Melkite Greek Catholic Patriarchal Exarchate of Kuwait
- Lebanon:
  - Melkite Greek Catholic Archeparchy of Baalbek
  - Melkite Greek Catholic Archeparchy of Baniyas and Marjeyoun (suffragan of Tyre)
  - Melkite Greek Catholic Archeparchy of Beirut and Byblos (nominally Metropolitan)
  - Melkite Greek Catholic Archeparchy of Sidon and Deir el-Kamar (suffragan of Tyre)
  - Melkite Greek Catholic Archeparchy of Tripoli (suffragan of Tyre)
  - Metropolitan Melkite Greek Catholic Archeparchy of Tyre (with three Lebanese archiepiscopal suffragans)
  - Melkite Greek Catholic Archeparchy of Zahle and Forzol and all the Bekaa
- Syria, where the Patriarch of Antioch has the style of Titular Patriarch of Antioch:
  - Melkite Greek Catholic Archeparchy of Damascus, Patriarchal See of Antioch.
  - Melkite Greek Catholic Archeparchy of Aleppo (nominally Metropolitan)
  - Melkite Greek Catholic Archeparchy of Bosra and Hauran (Archeparchy of Khabab) (nominally metropolitan)
  - Melkite Greek Catholic Archeparchy of Homs (united with titular sees Hama and Yabroud) (nominally metropolitan)
  - Melkite Greek Catholic Archeparchy of Latakia and the Valley of the Christians

Throughout the rest of the world, the Melkite Catholic church has dioceses and exarchates for its diaspora in:

- Australia and New Zealand (Oceania):
  - Melkite Greek Catholic Eparchy of Saint Michael Archangel in Sydney
- Turkey (Eurasia):
  - Melkite Greek Catholic Patriarchal Exarchate of Istanbul
- North America:
  - Melkite Greek Catholic Eparchy of Saint-Sauveur in Montréal (Canada).
  - Melkite Greek Catholic Eparchy of Nuestra Señora del Paraíso in Mexico City (Mexico).
  - Melkite Greek Catholic Eparchy of Newton (United States of America)
- South America:
  - Melkite Greek Catholic Apostolic Exarchate of Argentina
  - Melkite Greek Catholic Eparchy of Nossa Senhora do Paraíso em São Paulo (Brazil, suffragan of the Latin Metropolitan of São Paulo)
  - Melkite Greek Catholic Apostolic Exarchate of Venezuela, Caracas.

Furthermore, one of the Ordinaries is appointed Apostolic visitor for the countries without proper ordinariates in Western Europe, while in some countries the Melkite diaspora is served pastorally by an Ordinariate for Eastern Catholic faithful.

==== Romanian Greek Catholic Church (Major Archiepiscopal) ====
An ecclesiastical province sui juris, covering Romania:

- Romanian Catholic Archeparchy of Fagaraș and Alba Iulia, the Major Archbishopric, with cathedral see at Blaj, Alba Julia
  - Romanian Catholic Eparchy of Oradea Mare
  - Romanian Catholic Eparchy of Cluj-Gherla
  - Romanian Catholic Eparchy of Lugos
  - Romanian Catholic Eparchy of Maramureș
  - Romanian Catholic Eparchy of Saint Basil the Great of Bucharest

Exempt, i.e. Immediately subject to the Holy See

- Romanian Catholic Eparchy of St George's in Canton, bishopric for the diaspora in North America (United States and Canada), with cathedral see in Canton, Ohio (USA)

==== Ukrainian Greek Catholic Church (Major Archiepiscopal) ====
Exempt, immediately subject to the Holy See

- Ukrainian Catholic Apostolic Exarchate of Germany and Scandinavia, with cathedral see in Munich (Bavaria, Germany), for Germany, Denmark, Finland, Norway and Sweden
- Ukrainian Catholic Apostolic Exarchate of Italy, with cathedral see in Rome

Ukrainian provinces and Metropolitan dependencies

- Ukrainian Catholic Major Archeparchy of Kyiv–Halych, the Major Archiocese and head of the particular church
  - Ukrainian Catholic Archeparchy of Kyiv, the Metropitan Archeparchy
  - Ukrainian Catholic Archiepiscopal Exarchate of Crimea (Krym), on the Russian-annexed Crimea, with cathedral see at Simferopol
  - Ukrainian Catholic Archiepiscopal Exarchate of Donetsk
  - Ukrainian Catholic Archiepiscopal Exarchate of Kharkiv
  - Ukrainian Catholic Archiepiscopal Exarchate of Lutsk
  - Ukrainian Catholic Archiepiscopal Exarchate of Odesa
- Ukrainian Catholic Archeparchy of Lviv (Metropolitan Archeparchy)
  - Ukrainian Catholic Eparchy of Stryi
  - Ukrainian Catholic Eparchy of Sambir–Drohobych
  - Ukrainian Catholic Eparchy of Sokal–Zhovkva
- Ukrainian Catholic Archeparchy of Ternopil–Zboriv (Metropolitan Archeparchy)
  - Ukrainian Catholic Eparchy of Buchach
  - Ukrainian Catholic Eparchy of Kamyanets-Podilskyi
- Ukrainian Catholic Archeparchy of Ivano-Frankivsk (Metropolitan Archeparchy)
  - Ukrainian Catholic Eparchy of Chernivtsi
  - Ukrainian Catholic Eparchy of Kolomyia

Polish province

- Ukrainian Catholic Archeparchy of Przemyśl–Warsaw (Metropolitan Archeparchy)
  - Ukrainian Catholic Eparchy of Olsztyn–Gdańsk
  - Ukrainian Catholic Eparchy of Wrocław-Koszalin

European dioceses These eparchies are immediately dependent on the Major Archbishop, not part of his province:

- Ukrainian Catholic Eparchy of the Holy Family of London (Ukrainian Catholic Eparchy in Great Britain), with cathedral see in London, for England, Scotland and Wales (in the UK)
- Ukrainian Catholic Eparchy of Saint Vladimir the Great of Paris (Ukrainian Catholic Eparchy in France), with cathedral see in Paris, for France, Belgium, Luxembourg, the Netherlands and Switzerland

Overseas provinces and Metropolitan dependencies

- Ukrainian Catholic Archeparchy of Winnipeg, Metropolitan of the province in Canada
  - Ukrainian Catholic Eparchy of Edmonton
  - Ukrainian Catholic Eparchy of Toronto and Eastern Canada
  - Ukrainian Catholic Eparchy of Saskatoon
  - Ukrainian Catholic Eparchy of New Westminster
- Ukrainian Catholic Archeparchy of Philadelphia, Metropolitan of the United States province
  - Ukrainian Catholic Eparchy of Chicago
  - Ukrainian Catholic Eparchy of Stamford
  - Ukrainian Catholic Eparchy of Parma
- Ukrainian Catholic Archeparchy of São João Batista em Curitiba, Metropolitan of the Brazilian province
  - Ukrainian Catholic Eparchy of Imaculada Conceição in Prudentópolis

Overseas Eparchies, suffragans of Latin Church Metropolitan Archbishops

- Ukrainian Catholic Eparchy of Santa María del Patrocinio in Buenos Aires with cathedral see in Buenos Aires, under the otherwise Latin Church ecclesiastical province of Buenos Aires (Argentina)
- Ukrainian Catholic Eparchy of Saints Peter and Paul of Melbourne with cathedral see in North Melbourne, Victoria, Australia, for Australia, New Zealand and Oceania, under the otherwise Latin Church ecclesiastical province of Melbourne (Australia)

==== Hungarian Greek Catholic Church (Metropolitan) ====
A single ecclesiastical province sui juris

- Hungarian Catholic Archeparchy of Hajdúdorog, the Metropolitanate in chief, with two suffragan bishoprics:
  - Hungarian Catholic Eparchy of Miskolc
  - Hungarian Catholic Eparchy of Nyíregyháza

==== Ruthenian Greek Catholic Church (Metropolitan) ====
The more general adjective "Byzantine" is often used instead of "Ruthenian" in North America.

Although its origins are, as the name suggests, in Ruthenia, (now part of Slovakia and Ukraine) its sole exempt diocese (i.e. immediately subject to the Holy See), covers the Czech Republic while all other dioceses depend from the US-based Metropolitan head of the church:

- Ruthenian Apostolic Exarchate of Czech Republic

There is a sole ecclesiastical province, the Metropolitanate sui juris, entirely within the United States – the Byzantine Catholic Metropolitan Church of Pittsburgh:

- Archeparchy of Pittsburgh, head of the particular church, the Metropolitan Archdiocese, with three suffragan dioceses:)
  - Ruthenian Catholic Eparchy of Parma
  - Ruthenian Catholic Eparchy of Passaic
  - Ruthenian Catholic Eparchy of Holy Protection of Mary Phoenix
  - Exarchate of Saints Cyril and Methodius of Toronto for Slovak Greek Catholics

A further directly dependent on the Metropolitan:

- Ruthenian Catholic Eparchy of Mukacheve, in Ukraine, but only for Zakarpattia Oblast

==== Slovak Greek Catholic Church (Metropolitan) ====
The Synod is the Council of the Slovak Church

- Slovak Metropolitanate sui juris of Prešov, the head of the particular church and sole province's metropolitan archeparch, with two suffragan eparchies:
  - Slovak Catholic Eparchy of Bratislava

==== Greek Catholic Church of Croatia and Serbia (no unified structure) ====
- Croatian Catholic Eparchy of Križevci, in Croatia, also covering Slovenia and Bosnia-Herzegovina; suffragan in the ecclesiastical province of the Latin Church Metropolitan Archbishop of Zagreb
- exempt: Byzantine Catholic Eparchy of Saint Nicholas of Ruski Krstur, for the Catholics of Byzantine Rite in Serbia

==== Italo-Albanian Catholic Church (no unified structure) ====
All these are entirely exempt, i.e. each directly subject to the Holy See:

- Italo-Albanese Eparchy of Piana degli Albanesi, with cathedral see at Palermo, on Sicily
- Italo-Albanese Eparchy of Lungro, with cathedral see at Lungro, near Cosenza in Calabria
- Italo-Albanese Territorial Abbacy of Santa Maria di Grottaferrata

==== Albanian Greek Catholic Church (Apostolic Administration) ====
- Only the Apostolic Administration of Southern Albania, with a pro-cathedral see at Vlorë, which is suffragan to the Ecclesiastical Province of the Latin Church Metropolitan Archbishop of Tiranë–Durrës

==== Belarusian Greek Catholic Church (Apostolic Visitation) ====
- No diocese presently, only an apostolic visitor for Belarus and another for abroad

==== Bulgarian Greek Catholic Church (Episcopal) ====
- Only the exempt Bulgarian Catholic Apostolic Exarchate of Sofia, which participates in the Latin Church Episcopal conference of Bulgaria

==== Greek Byzantine Catholic Church (no unified structure) ====
entirely exempt, i.e. each directly subject to the Holy See:

- Greek Apostolic Exarchate of Greece, with cathedral see in Athens, for Greece
- Greek Apostolic Exarchate of Istanbul, with see in Istanbul, for Turkey

==== Macedonian Greek Catholic Church (Episcopal) ====
- Only the exempt Macedonian Catholic Eparchy of the Assumption of the Blessed Virgin Mary in Strumica-Skopje, with cathedral see in Strumica; vested in the Latin Church bishop of Skopje, also in Macedonia, in the ecclesiastical province of the Metropolitan Archbishop of Vrhbosna/Sarajevo, in Bosnia

==== Russian Greek Catholic Church (no current formalised structure) ====
entirely exempt, i.e. directly subject to the Holy See:

- Russian Apostolic Exarchate of Harbin, with former cathedral see in Harbin, in and for China
- Russian Apostolic Exarchate of Russia, vacant since 1951

=== Alexandrian Rite churches ===
==== Coptic Catholic Church (Patriarchal) ====
- Coptic Catholic Patriarchal See of Alexandria, actually in Cairo; also Metropolitan Archbishop of the church's only ecclesiastical province sui juris, with the following suffragans, all in Egypt:
  - Coptic Catholic Eparchy of Alexandria
  - Coptic Catholic Eparchy of Assiut
  - Coptic Catholic Eparchy of Guizeh
  - Coptic Catholic Eparchy of Ismayliah
  - Coptic Catholic Eparchy of Luqsor
  - Coptic Catholic Eparchy of Minya
  - Coptic Catholic Eparchy of Sohag

==== Ethiopian Catholic Church (Metropolitan) ====
A single ecclesiastical province sui juris, covering Ethiopia (Synod styled Council of the Ethiopian Church)

- Ethiopic Catholic Metropolitanate of Addis Abeba, the only and Metropolitan archeparchy (archdiocese), with three suffragan eparchies (dioceses):
  - Ethiopian Catholic Eparchy of Adigrat
  - Ethiopian Catholic Eparchy of Bahir Dar–Dessie
  - Ethiopian Catholic Eparchy of Emdeber

==== Eritrean Catholic Church (Metropolitan) ====
A single ecclesiastical province sui juris, covering all and only Eritrea, which has no Latin Church diocese

- Eritrean Catholic Metropolitanate of Asmara, the only archeparchy, with three suffragan eparchies:
  - Eritrean Catholic Eparchy of Barentu
  - Eritrean Catholic Eparchy of Keren
  - Eritrean Catholic Eparchy of Segheneyti

=== West Syriac/Syro-Antiochene Rite churches ===
==== Maronite Catholic Church (Patriarchal) ====
- Maronite Catholic Patriarchate of Antioch and the Whole Levant, at Beirut (Lebanon), Chief of the church
- Exempt, i.e. immediately subject to the Holy See:
  - In Africa: Maronite Catholic Eparchy of Annunciation of Ibadan, for the Western and Central African states, with cathedral see being Church of Our Lady of the Annunciation, in Ibadan, Nigeria
  - In South America: Maronite Catholic Apostolic Exarchate of Colombia, with pro-cathedral see being Church of Our Lady of Lebanon, in Bogotá, Colombia

Immediately subject to the Patriarch:

- In Lebanon:
  - Maronite Catholic Archeparchy of Antelias
  - Maronite Catholic Eparchy of Baalbek-Deir El Ahmar
  - Maronite Catholic Eparchy of Batroun
  - Maronite Catholic Archeparchy of Beirut
  - Maronite Catholic Eparchy of Byblos
  - Maronite Catholic Eparchy of Joubbé, Sarba and Jounieh (sole Suffragan of the Patriarch of Antioch)
  - Maronite Catholic Eparchy of Sidon
  - Maronite Catholic Archeparchy of Tripoli
  - Maronite Catholic Archeparchy of Tyre
  - Maronite Catholic Eparchy of Zahleh
- In the Holy Land:
  - Maronite Catholic Archeparchy of Haifa and the Holy Land, in Israel whose Archeparch holds the offices of Patriarchal Vicar of:
    - Patriarchal Exarch of the Maronite Catholic Patriarchal Exarchate of Jerusalem and Palestine in the Palestinian Territories and
    - Maronite Catholic Patriarchal Exarchate of Jordan in (Trans)Jordan
- In Syria:
  - Maronite Catholic Archeparchy of Damascus
  - Maronite Catholic Archeparchy of Aleppo
  - Maronite Catholic Eparchy of Latakia
- In Cyprus: Maronite Catholic Archeparchy of Cyprus in Nicosia
- In Egypt: Maronite Catholic Eparchy of Cairo

Subject to the Synod, partly exempt

The following are subject to the Synod in matters of Liturgical and Particular Law; otherwise they are exempt (i.e. immediately subject to the Holy See and its Roman Congregation for the Eastern Churches):

- In Europe:
  - Maronite Catholic Eparchy of Our Lady of Lebanon of Paris in France
- In North and Central America:
  - Maronite Catholic Eparchy of Saint Maron of Montreal, in Canada
  - Maronite Catholic Eparchy of Our Lady of Lebanon of Los Angeles in the United States (US West Coast)
  - Maronite Catholic Eparchy of Saint Maron of Brooklyn in the United States (US East Coast)
  - Maronite Catholic Eparchy of Our Lady of the Martyrs of Lebanon in Mexico in Mexico
- In Oceania:
  - Maronite Catholic Eparchy of Saint Maron of Sydney, in Australia

Suffragan Eparchies in the ecclesiastical provinces of Latin Metropolitan Archbishops

Both eparchies are in South America:

- Maronite Catholic Eparchy of San Charbel in Buenos Aires in Argentina, suffragan of the Roman Catholic Archdiocese of Buenos Aires
- Maronite Catholic Eparchy of Our Lady of Lebanon of São Paulo in Brazil, suffragan of the Roman Catholic Archdiocese of São Paulo
- (Arch)eparchies immediately subject to the Patriarch of Cilicia, but not part of his province
  - Maronite Eparchy of Notre-Dame du Liban de Paris, with cathedral see Cathédrale Notre-Dame du Liban in Paris; also Apostolic Visitor of the Maronites in Western and Northern Europe

Eparchies suffragan to a Latin Metropolitan

- Maronite Eparchy of San Charbel en Buenos Aires, in the province of the Metropolitan Roman Catholic Archdiocese of Buenos Aires

==== Syriac Catholic Church (Patriarchal) ====
Exempt, directly subject to the Holy See

- Syriac Catholic Apostolic Exarchate of Canada, with cathedral see at Montréal, Québec
- Syriac Catholic Apostolic Exarchate of Venezuela, with cathedral see at Maracay, Aragua

Patriarchal ecclesiastical province

- Syriac Catholic Patriarchate of Antioch, with a cathedral see in Beirut, for Lebanon
  - with a single suffragan, for the same proper eparchy (diocese) of the Patriarch, the Syriac Catholic Diocese of Beirut

Patriarchal exarchates

- Syriac Catholic Patriarchal Exarchate of Basra and the Gulf, for southern Iraq and Kuwait
- Syriac Catholic Patriarchal Exarchate of Jerusalem, with cathedral see in Jerusalem, for the Holy Land (Palestine and Israel) and Jordan
- Syriac Catholic Patriarchal Exarchate of Turkey, for Turkey

Other dioceses and archdioceses

None of these are Metropolitan; they are directly subject to the Patriarch (but not part of his province).

- Syriac Catholic Archeparchy of Baghdad, Archeparchy for central Iraq
- Syriac Catholic Archeparchy of Mosul, Archeparchy for northern Iraq
- Syriac Catholic Archeparchy of Aleppo, Archeparchy for part of Syria (cfr. infra)
- Syriac Catholic Archeparchy of Hassaké–Nisibi, Archeparchy for part of Syria (cfr. infra)
- Syriac Catholic Eparchy of Cairo, for Egypt
- Syriac Territory Dependent on the Patriarch of Sudan and South Sudan, no proper see, but vested in the Cairo Eparch as Protosynkellos for Sudan and South Sudan
- Syriac Catholic Eparchy of Our Lady of Deliverance of Newark, with cathedral see at Bayonne, New Jersey, for the United States

Nominal Metropolitans

These are without suffragans. Both are in Syria:

- Syriac Metropolitan Archeparchy of Damascus
- Syriac Metropolitan Archeparchy of Homs

==== Syro-Malankara Catholic Church (Major Archiepiscopal) ====
Exempt, immediately subject to the Holy See:

- Syro-Malankara Catholic Eparchy of Gurgaon, see located near Delhi, serving 22 states of India
- Syro-Malankara Catholic Eparchy of St. Mary, Queen of Peace, of the United States of America and Canada, with cathedral see at Elmont, New York

Ecclesiastical Province of Trivandrum

- Syro-Malankara Catholic Major Archeparchy of Trivandrum, the Major Archbishop, chief of the particular church
  - Syro-Malankara Catholic Eparchy of Marthandom
  - Syro-Malankara Catholic Eparchy of Mavelikara
  - Syro-Malankara Catholic Eparchy of Parassala
  - Syro-Malankara Catholic Eparchy of Pathanamthitta
  - Syro-Malankara Catholic Eparchy of St. Ephrem of Khadki, with see near Pune, in western India's Maharashtra state, but also serving Goa, Andhra Pradesh, Telangana and parts of Tamil Nadu and Karnataka

Ecclesiastical Province of Tiruvalla

- Syro-Malankara Catholic Archeparchy of Tiruvalla
  - Syro-Malankara Catholic Eparchy of Muvattupuzha
  - Syro-Malankara Catholic Eparchy of Bathery
  - Syro-Malankara Catholic Eparchy of Puthur

Immediately subject to the Synod of the Syro-Malankara Church

- ‍–‍

=== Armenian Rite: Armenian Catholic Church (Patriarchal) ===
Exempt, directly subject to the Holy See

- Ordinariate for Armenian-rite Catholics in Eastern Europe, with cathedral see in Giumri, Armenia; actually only for Armenia, Georgia (Gruzinia), Russia and Ukraine
- Ordinariate for Armenian-rite Catholics in Greece
- Ordinariate for Armenian-rite Catholics in Romania
- Armenian Apostolic Exarchate of Latin America and Mexico, Apostolic Exarchate with cathedral see in São Paulo, in Brazil, also for Mexico and Uruguay

Patriarchal ecclesiastical province of Cilicia

The province was named after Ancient Cilicia, the part of Asia Minor (modern Turkey's Anatolia) where its see was originally located.

- Armenian Catholic Patriarchate of Cilicia, the patriarchal see of the Armenian Catholic Church, with cathedral in Beirut, Lebanon, as Metropolitan Archeparch, with four suffragan eparchies
  - Armenian Catholic Archeparchy of Beirut, the Proper (arch)eparchy of the Armenian Catholic Patriarch, in Lebanon and Turkey
  - Armenian Catholic Eparchy of Alexandria, with cathedral see in Cairo, in and for Egypt, also for Sudan
  - Armenian Catholic Eparchy of Isfahan, with cathedral see in Isfahan, in and for Iran
  - Armenian Catholic Eparchy of Kameshli, with cathedral see in Qamishli, in and for Syria

Other eparchies

These eparchies are immediately subject to the Patriarch of Cilicia, but not part of his province.

- Armenian Catholic Archeparchy of Aleppo, Archeparchy (not metropolitan) with cathedral see in Aleppo, in and for part of Syria
- Armenian Catholic Archeparchy of Istanbul, Archeparchy (not metropolitan) with cathedral see in Istanbul (the former Constantinople), in and for Turkey
- Armenian Catholic Archeparchy of Baghdad, Archeparchy (not metropolitan) with cathedral see in Baghdad, in and for Iraq
- Armenian Catholic Archeparchy of Lviv, Archeparchy (not metropolitan) with cathedral see in Lviv, in and for (part of) Ukraine
- Armenian Catholic Patriarchal Exarchate of Damascus, Exarchate with cathedral see in Damascus, in and for part of Syria
- Armenian Catholic Patriarchal Exarchate of Jerusalem and Amman, Exarchate with cathedral see in Jerusalem, in the Holy Land (Israel/ Palestine), also for Jordan
- Armenian Catholic Eparchy of San Gregorio de Narek en Buenos Aires, Eparchy with cathedral see in Buenos Aires, in and for Argentina
- Armenian Catholic Eparchy of Our Lady of Nareg in Glendale, Eparchy with cathedral see in Brooklyn, New York, in the United States, also for Canada
- Armenian Catholic Eparchy of Sainte-Croix-de-Paris, Eparchy with cathedral see in Paris, in and for France

=== East Syriac / Syro-Oriental Rite churches ===
==== Chaldean Catholic Church (Patriarchal) ====
- Chaldean Catholic Catholicos-Patriarch of Babylon
- the patriarchal proper Metropolitanate Chaldean Catholic Metropolitan Archdiocese of Baghdad, with its three suffragans:
  - Chaldean Catholic Eparchy of Alquoch
  - Chaldean Catholic Eparchy of Amadiya
  - Chaldean Catholic Eparchy of Aqra, Eparchy with episcopal see in Akre
- Chaldean Catholic Metropolitan Archdiocese of Kirkuk (Iraq)
- Chaldean Catholic Metropolitan Archdiocese of Tehran (Iran)
- Chaldean Catholic Metropolitan Archdiocese of Urmya with its sole suffragan:
  - Chaldean Catholic Eparchy of Salmas
- Archeparchies of:
  - Chaldean Catholic Archeparchy of Ahvaz, Archeparchy with cathedral see in Ahvaz
  - Chaldean Catholic Archeparchy of Basra (Iraq), Archeparchy with cathedral see in Basra
  - Chaldean Catholic Archeparchy of Diyarbakır, Archeparchy with cathedral see in Diyarbakır
  - Chaldean Catholic Archeparchy of Erbil, Archeparchy with cathedral see in Ankawa
  - Chaldean Catholic Archeparchy of Mosul (Iraq)
- Eparchies of:
  - Chaldean Catholic Eparchy of Aleppo, Eparchy with cathedral see in Aleppo, in and for Syria
  - Chaldean Catholic Eparchy of Beirut, Eparchy with cathedral see in Beirut, in and for Lebanon
  - Chaldean Catholic Eparchy of Cairo, Eparchy with cathedral see in Cairo, in and for Egypt
  - Chaldean Catholic Eparchy of Saint Peter The Apostle of San Diego, Eparchy with cathedral see in El Cajon, in and for the Western United States
  - Chaldean Catholic Eparchy of Saint Thomas the Apostle of Detroit, Eparchy with cathedral see in Southfield, in and for the Eastern United States
  - Chaldean Catholic Eparchy of Mar Addai of Toronto, Eparchy with cathedral see in North York, in and for Canada
  - Chaldean Catholic Eparchy of Saint Thomas the Apostle of Sydney, Eparchy with cathedral see in Bossley Park, in and for Australia
  - Chaldean Catholic Eparchy of Sulaimaniya, suppressed in 2013
  - Chaldean Catholic Eparchy of Zaku, suppressed in 1987, ressurected in 2001, then suppressed again in 2013
- Territories dependent on the Patriarch:
  - Chaldean Catholic Territory Dependent on the Patriarch of Jerusalem
  - Chaldean Catholic Territory Dependent on the Patriarch of Jordan

==== Syro-Malabar Catholic Church (Major Archiepiscopal) ====
Ecclesiastical Province of Eranakulam‑Angamaly

- Syro-Malabar Catholic Archdiocese of Eranakulam-Angamaly, the major Archdiocese, head of the particular church, and Metropolitan Archeparchy of Eranakulam-Angamaly
  - Syro-Malabar Catholic Eparchy of Idukki
  - Syro-Malabar Catholic Eparchy of Kothamangalam

Ecclesiastical Province of Changanassery

- Metropolitan Archdiocese (Archeparchy) of Changanassery
  - Syro-Malabar Catholic Eparchy of Kanjirappally
  - Syro-Malabar Catholic Eparchy of Palai
  - Syro-Malabar Catholic Eparchy of Thuckalay

Ecclesiastical Province of Faridabad

- Syro-Malabar Catholic Archeparchy of Faridabad, with see near Delhi, also serves Haryana, Punjab, Himachal Pradesh, Jammu and Kashmir and parts of Uttar Pradesh
  - Syro-Malabar Catholic Eparchy of Bijnor
  - Syro-Malabar Catholic Eparchy of Gorakhpur

Ecclesiastical Province of Kalyan

- Syro-Malabar Catholic Archeparchy of Kalyan, see located near Bombay, but serves all of Maharashtra state
  - Syro-Malabar Catholic Eparchy of Chanda
  - Syro-Malabar Catholic Eparchy of Rajkot

Ecclesiastical Province of Shamshabad

- Syro-Malabar Catholic Archeparchy of Shamshabad
  - Syro-Malabar Catholic Eparchy of Adilabad

Ecclesiastical Province of Tellicherry

- Syro-Malabar Catholic Archeparchy of Tellicherry
  - Syro-Malabar Catholic Eparchy of Belthangady
  - Syro-Malabar Catholic Eparchy of Bhadravathi
  - Syro-Malabar Catholic Eparchy of Mananthavady
  - Syro-Malabar Catholic Eparchy of Mandya
  - Syro-Malabar Catholic Eparchy of Thamarassery

Ecclesiastical Province of Thrissur

- Syro-Malabar Catholic Archeparchy of Thrissur
  - Syro-Malabar Catholic Eparchy of Hosur
  - Syro-Malabar Catholic Eparchy of Irinjalakuda
  - Syro-Malabar Catholic Eparchy of Palghat
  - Syro-Malabar Catholic Eparchy of Ramanathapuram

Ecclesiastical Province of Ujjain

- Syro-Malabar Catholic Archeparchy of Ujjain
  - Syro-Malabar Catholic Eparchy of Jagdalpur
  - Syro-Malabar Catholic Eparchy of Sagar
  - Syro-Malabar Catholic Eparchy of Satna

Archdiocese of Kottayam

- Syro-Malabar Catholic Archeparchy of Kottayam (Archeparchy of Kottayam, no suffragan)

Exempt, immediately subject to the Holy See

- Syro-Malabar Catholic Eparchy of Mississauga, for Canada
- St. Thomas Syro-Malabar Catholic Eparchy of Chicago, with cathedral see at Bellwood, Illinois, for the USA; also Syro-Malabar Apostolic visitator in Canada
- Syro-Malabar Catholic Eparchy of Great Britain, with cathedral see at Preston, Lancashire, England; for England, Scotland & Wales
- Syro-Malabar Catholic Eparchy of Saint Thomas the Apostle of Melbourne, for Australia, with cathedral see at Melbourne, Victoria state; also Syro-Malabar Apostolic visitator in New Zealand

== Other and various types of Catholic sees and jurisdictions ==
- List of Catholic dioceses (alphabetical)
- List of Catholic archdioceses
- Titular (arch)episcopal sees
  - List of Catholic titular sees (A)
  - List of Catholic titular sees (B-K)
  - List of Catholic titular sees (L-M)
  - List of Catholic titular sees (N-S)
  - List of Catholic titular sees (T-Z)
- List of Catholic military dioceses
- List of Catholic apostolic administrations
- List of Catholic apostolic vicariates
- List of Eastern Catholic exarchates
- List of Catholic apostolic prefectures
- List of Catholic territorial prelatures
- List of Catholic missions sui juris

== See also ==
=== Eastern churches ===
- Coptic Catholic dioceses
- Ethiopic Catholic dioceses
- List of Armenian dioceses
- List of Chaldean dioceses
- Macedonian Catholic Church
- Maronite dioceses
- Melkite Greek Catholic dioceses
- Ruthenian Greek Catholic dioceses
- Syriac Catholic dioceses
- Syro-Malabar Catholic dioceses
- Ukrainian Greek Catholic dioceses
