= Francis Cui Qingqi =

The Most Reverend Francis Joseph Cui Qingqi
- Archbishop of Hankou
- Archdiocese: Roman Catholic Archdiocese of Hankou
- See: Delhi
- Appointed: 23 June 2021
- Installed: 23 June 2021
- Predecessor: Giuseppe Ferruccio Maurizio Rosà

Orders
- Ordination: 8 December 1991
- Consecration: 8 September 2020 by Joseph Ma Yinglin

Personal details
- Born: February 1964 (age 62) Xiangyuan County, Shanxi Province, China
- Motto: 成為一切，為了一切，僅遵聖言
- Coat of arms

Francis Joseph Cui Qingqi (崔庆琪) is the archbishop of the Roman Catholic Archdiocese of Hankou (Wuhan) in China. He was ordained as bishop on September 8, 2021.

== Biography ==
He was born in Xiangyuan County in Shanxi Province of China in February 1964. He entered seminary to become a priest in Wuhan in 1987 and was ordained on 8 December 1991.

In December 2012 Fr. Francis was appointed as the administrator of the Wuhan diocese and Vicar of the cathedral, after the previous administrator of the diocese Father Shen Guoan was dismissed for disloyalty to the Chinese government. In 2016 he was appointed as deputy secretary of the state-controlled (although not Vatican recognized) Bishops' Conference of the Catholic Church in China.

== Ordination ==
The Chinese government amalgamated three neighbouring dioceses, including the Archdiocese of Hankou, into the diocese of Wuhan, without approval from the Vatican. As a result, the bishops of Wuhan within the state-controlled Chinese Catholic Church are bishops of Wuhan, rather than archbishops of Hankou. In 2007, Bernardine Dong Guangqing who was the state-approved bishop of Wuhan died. In the same year Pope Benedict had issued a letter that recognized most of the state-approved bishops in China as being in communion with Rome and which tried to work towards progress in resolving the issues surrounding the difficult situation between the Vatican, the Chinese Catholic Church and the Chinese government. The Chinese government did not select a new bishop for the unrecognized diocese of Wuhan after Bishop Bernardine's death in 2007.

In 2018 a secret agreement was reached between the Vatican and the Chinese government that allowed for the recognition of all the state-approved bishops and the creation of a mutually agreed framework for the appointment of new bishops. In September 2020, Fr. Francis was nominated by the government to become the new bishop of Wuhan. In June 2021, Pope Francis gave his approval to the ordination. He was ordained on September 8 (the feast of the birth of the Virgin Mary) at St. Joseph's Cathedral, Wuhan, which was also the previous seat of the Archbishop of Hankou. His principal consecrator was Ma Yinglin of the archdiocese of Kunming. Co-consecrators were Archbishop Joseph Li Shan of the archdiocese of Beijing and Bishop Shen Bin of the diocese of Haimen.
