= Anthony Li Hui =

Chinese bishop

Most Reverend Anthony Li Hui
- Coadjutor Bishop of Pingliang
- Native name: 安东尼李辉
- Archdiocese: Lanzhou
- Diocese: Pingliang
- Appointed: 11 January 2021
- Successor: Incumbent

Orders
- Ordination: 24 November 1996
- Consecration: 28 July 2021 by Joseph Ma Yinglin

Personal details
- Born: 1972 (age 53–54) Mei County, Shaanxi province, China
- Denomination: Roman Catholic
- Motto: FIAT VOLUNTAS TUA

Anthony Li Hui is a Chinese prelate of the Roman Catholic Church serving as Coadjutor Bishop of the Roman Catholic Diocese of Pingliang, China.

== Early life ==
Anthony was born in Mei County, Shaanxi province, China in year 1972.

== Priesthood ==
Li was ordained a priest on 24 November 1996.

== Episcopate ==
On 24 July 2020, Anthony was selected as the Coadjutor Bishop of the Roman Catholic Diocese of Pingliang and confirmed on 11 January 2021. He was consecrated as a bishop on 28 July 2021 by Joseph Ma Yinglin.
