= St. Joseph's Cathedral, Wuhan =

- 圣若瑟天主堂
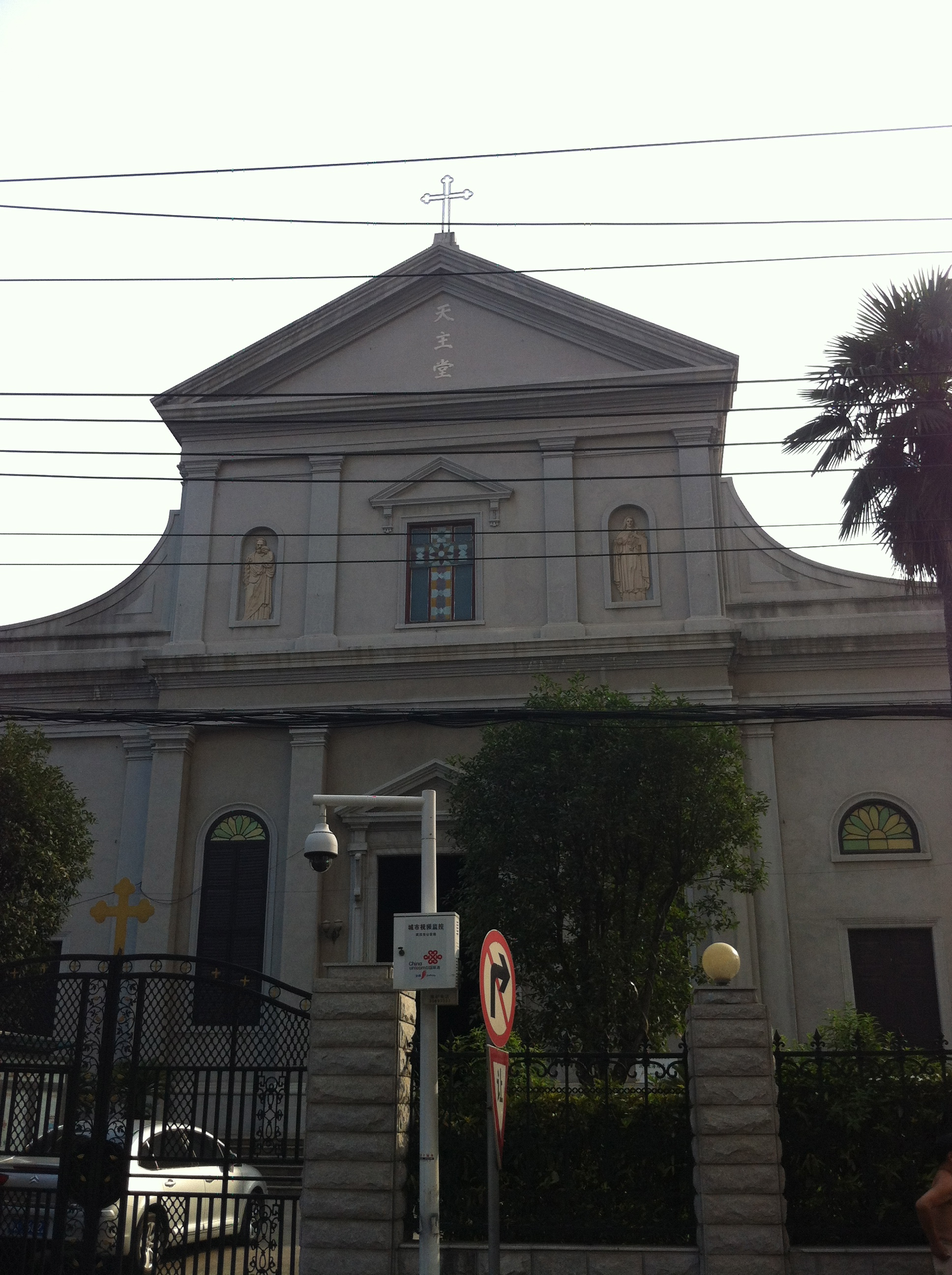
- St. Joseph's Cathedral in 2013

- Location within Hubei
- 30.57987°N 114.2935813°E
- Location: 16 Shanghai Rd, Hankou, Wuhan
- Country: China
- Denomination: Catholic

History
- Founded: 1876
- Founder(s): Eustache Modeste Zanoli, Angelus Vaudagna
- Dedication: Saint Joseph

Architecture
- Style: Romanesque Revival
- Completed: 1876
- Construction cost: 120,000 francs

Administration
- Archdiocese: Roman Catholic Archdiocese of Hankou

Clergy
- Bishop: Francis Cui Qingqi

St. Joseph's Cathedral, Wuhan
- Traditional Chinese: 聖若瑟天主堂
- Simplified Chinese: 圣若瑟天主堂
- Literal meaning: Saint Joseph Catholic Church
Transcriptions
Standard Mandarin
- Hanyu Pinyin: Shèng ruò sè tiān zhǔ táng

St. Joseph's Cathedral is a Catholic cathedral located in Wuhan, Hubei, China. It was completed in 1876, shut down during the Cultural Revolution, and re-opened in 1980. The cathedral is located at 16 Shanghai Road, Wuhan.

== Architecture ==
According to the government of Hubei, the cathedral building is a Romanesque Revival two-story structure made of timber and brick. Its total length is 40 meters (130 feet) and total width is 26 meters (85 feet). Its main hall is 14 meters (46 feet) wide.

On each side at the rear of the cathedral, there is a dome-shaped belfry. The cross at the top of the cathedral stands 22 meters (72 feet) high from the ground.

The building area of the cathedral is 1,024 square metres (11,020 square feet). It has five altars and can accommodate over 1,000 people.

== History ==
=== Construction ===
In 1862, Eustache Modeste Zanoli (Chinese name: 明位篤), then vicar apostolic of Hubei, moved the bishop's seat from Yingcheng to Wuchang. In 1866, he bought a section of marshland within the English concession of Hankou and turned it suitable for future constructions.

In 1875, Zanoli commissioned the Italian missionary Angelus Vaudagna to build St. Joseph's Cathedral. The cathedral was completed in 1876 and costed 120,000 francs.

=== World War II ===
On 18 January 1938, during the Second Sino-Japanese War, a memorial mass to mourn the soldiers and civilians killed and to pray for world peace. About 2,000 Chinese and foreign expatriates attended, including K. C. Wu.

The church building was damaged in the 1944 Operation Matterhorn air raid, and underwent reparation in 1948 and 1956.

=== People's Republic of China ===
In April 1958, Bernardine Dong Guangqing (董光清), a priest of the cathedral, was elected bishop of Hankou. He was the first bishop in China to be elected based on the self-election, self-consecration principle (Chinese: 自选自圣). Union of Catholic Asian News reported that the diocese asked for the approval of the Vatican before the ordination, but the Holy See declined, citing canon law that any ordination of bishops without papal mandate incurs automatic excommunication, with power reserved to the Holy See.

The cathedral was shut down during the Cultural Revolution and re-opened in 1980. Pope John Paul II recognized Dong as bishop of Hankou in 1984.

In May 2007, the funeral of Dong took place at the cathedral, with Bishop John Huo Cheng presiding. Vatican Radio reported that over a thousand people attended the funeral.

In September 2021, Francis Cui Qingqi (崔庆琪) was consecrated bishop at the cathedral. Joseph Ma Yinglin (马英林), bishop of Kunming, led the consecration ceremony.

== Religious services ==
The church offers masses throughout the week. At 7:00 am on the first Saturday of each month, the cathedral offers the Traditional Latin Mass, which is relatively uncommon among Chinese churches.

== See also ==
- Roman Catholic Archdiocese of Hankou
- Catholicism in China
