= Lawrence Zhang Wen-Chang =

- Apostolic Administrator of Kunming
- Church: Catholic Church
- Archdiocese: Archdiocese of Kunming
- In office: 2000 – 5 February 2012
- Predecessor: Louis He Dezong
- Successor: none
- Other posts: Apostolic Administrator of Zhaotong (2000-2012); Apostolic Administrator of Dali (2000-2012)

Orders
- Ordination: 1946

Personal details
- Born: 1920 Yunnan, Republic of China
- Died: 5 February 2012 (aged 91–92) Shilin Yi Autonomous County, Yunnan, China

Lawrence Zhang Wen-Chang (1920 – 5 February 2012) was a Chinese Roman Catholic Apostolic Administrator and priest. The Vatican appointed Zhang Wen-Chang as Apostolic Administrator of three dioceses or ecclesiastical territories in the Chinese province of Yunnan in 2000 – the Roman Catholic Archdiocese of Kunming, the Roman Catholic Diocese of Dali, and the Apostolic Prefecture of Zhaotong. He served in that position as an official, underground representative of the Vatican until his death in 2012. The underground Catholic Church has approximately 60,000 members in Yunnan, mostly composed of ethnic minorities.

== Biography ==
Zhang Wen-Chang was born in 1920. He was a member of the Sani ethnic group, a subgroup of the Yi people, an ethnic group from China and Vietnam. He enrolled in a Catholic seminary when he was twelve years old. He then graduated from the major seminary in Kunming and was ordained a Catholic priest in 1946. He worked as a priest at the Cathedral of the Sacred Heart of Jesus in Kunming following his ordination. In 1953, the Communist government forced Zhang Wen-Chang to raise rabbits and chickens in the aftermath of the Chinese Communist Revolution.

In 1958, Father Zhang Wen-Chang was arrested, charged with "counter revolutionary crimes", and imprisoned. He was held in a Chinese Reform through labor farm from 1962 to 1982. Upon his release, he began working part-time. He rejoined the Church as a full-time Catholic priest again in 1987.

In 2000, the Vatican appointed Zhang Wen-Chang as the Apostolic Administrator of the Roman Catholic Archdiocese of Kunming, the Roman Catholic Diocese of Dali, and the Apostolic Prefecture of Zhaotong. The Archdiocese of Kunming had been without a Vatican-mandated head since Archbishop Alexandre Derouineau was expelled from the country in 1952. (The People's Republic of China had appointed two priests affiliated with the Chinese Patriotic Catholic Association as archbishops, but they were not recognized by the Vatican since they were not appointed by the papacy).

Zhang Wen-Chang lived in Kunming during his tenure as Apostolic Administrator. As a leader within the underground Chinese Catholic Church, Zhang Wen-Chang was affiliated and officially recognized by the Holy See. He had no recognition from the government of the People's Republic of China, and was kept under police and government surveillance.

He was diagnosed with esophageal cancer in October 2011. He died in his hometown in the Shilin Yi Autonomous County in Yunnan on 5 February 2012, at the age of 92. His funeral included a seven-day viewing, according to Sani ethnic traditions.
