= Diocese of Pingliang =

Roman Catholic diocese in China

Diocese of Pingliang Dioecesis Pimliamensis 天主教平凉教区

Location
- Country: China
- Ecclesiastical province: Lanzhou
- Metropolitan: Lanzhou

Information
- Denomination: Catholic Church
- Rite: Latin Rite
- Cathedral: Cathedral in Pingliang

Current leadership
- Pope: Leo XIV
- Bishop: Anthony Li Hui
- Metropolitan Archbishop: Joseph Han Zhihai
- Bishops emeritus: Nicholas Han Jide, OFM Cap

The Roman Catholic Diocese of Pingliang (Latin: Pimliamen(sis), Chinese: 平涼) is a diocese located in the city of Pingliang (Gansu) in the ecclesiastical province of Lanzhou in China.

== History ==
- January 25, 1930: Established as Apostolic Prefecture of Pingliang 平涼 from the Apostolic Vicariate of Qinzhou 秦州
- June 24, 1950: Promoted as Diocese of Pingliang 平涼

== Leadership ==
Bishops of Pingliang 平涼 (Roman rite):

- Bishop Anthony Li Hui (2026 – Present)
- Bishop Nicholas Han Jide (1991 – 2026), retired
- Bishop Philippe Ma Ji (1987 – 1999)
- Bishop Ignacio Gregorio Larrañaga Lasa, O.F.M. Cap. (25 June 1950 – 18 February 1975)

== Bibliography ==
- GCatholic.org
- Catholic Hierarchy
