= Diocese of Xiangyang =

Roman Catholic diocese in China

Diocese of Xiangyang Dioecesis Siamiamensis 天主教襄阳教区

Location
- Country: China
- Ecclesiastical province: Hankou
- Metropolitan: Hankou

Statistics
- Population: Total; Catholics: (as of 1950); 1,163,824; 20,184 (1.7%)

Information
- Denomination: Roman Catholic
- Rite: Latin Rite

Current leadership
- Pope: Leo XIV
- Bishop: Sede Vacante
- Metropolitan Archbishop: Sede Vacante

The Roman Catholic Diocese of Xiangyang/Siangyang (Latin: Siamiamen(sis), Chinese: 襄陽) is a suffragan Latin diocese in the ecclesiastical province of the Metropolitan Archbishopric of Hankou in central China, yet it depends on the missionary Roman Congregation for the Evangelization of Peoples.

Its episcopal see is located in the city of Xiangyang, Hubei. No statistics available.

Vacant since 1974, without Apostolic administrator.

== History ==
- Established on May 25, 1936 as Apostolic Prefecture of Xiangyang 襄陽, on territory split off from the then Apostolic Vicariate of Laohekou 老河口
- May 10, 1951: Promoted as Diocese of Xiangyang 襄陽

== Ordinaries ==
(Roman Rite)

Apostolic Prefect of Xiangyang 襄陽

- Francis Yi Xuan-hua (Yi Hsüan-hua) (易宣化) (born China) (May 25, 1936 – May 10, 1951 see below)

Suffragan Bishops of Xiangyang

- Francis Yi Xuan-hua (Yi Hsüan-hua) (易宣化) (see above May 10, 1951 – death 1974).

== See also ==
- List of Catholic dioceses in China

== Sources and external links ==
- GCatholic.org - data for all sections
- Catholic Hierarchy
