= Diocese of Kangding =

Roman Catholic diocese in China

Diocese of Kangding Dioecesis Camtimensis 天主教康定教區 天主教康定教区
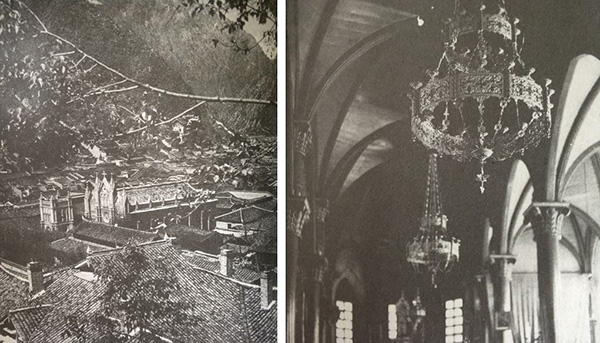
- The former Cathedral of the Sacred Heart at Kangding (exterior and interior), completed in 1912, and demolished during the Cultural Revolution. It was replaced by a smaller church bearing the same name in 1997.

Location
- Country: China
- Ecclesiastical province: Chongqing
- Metropolitan: Chongqing

Statistics
- Area: 160,000 km^{2} (62,000 sq mi)
- Population: Total; Catholics: (as of 1950); 4,000,000; 5,870 (0.1%)

Information
- Denomination: Catholic Church
- Sui iuris church: Latin Church
- Rite: Roman Rite
- Established: March 27, 1846 (as apostolic vicariate)
- Cathedral: Sacred Heart Cathedral, Kangding

Current leadership
- Pope: Leo XIV
- Bishop: Sede vacante
- Metropolitan Archbishop: Sede vacante

Map
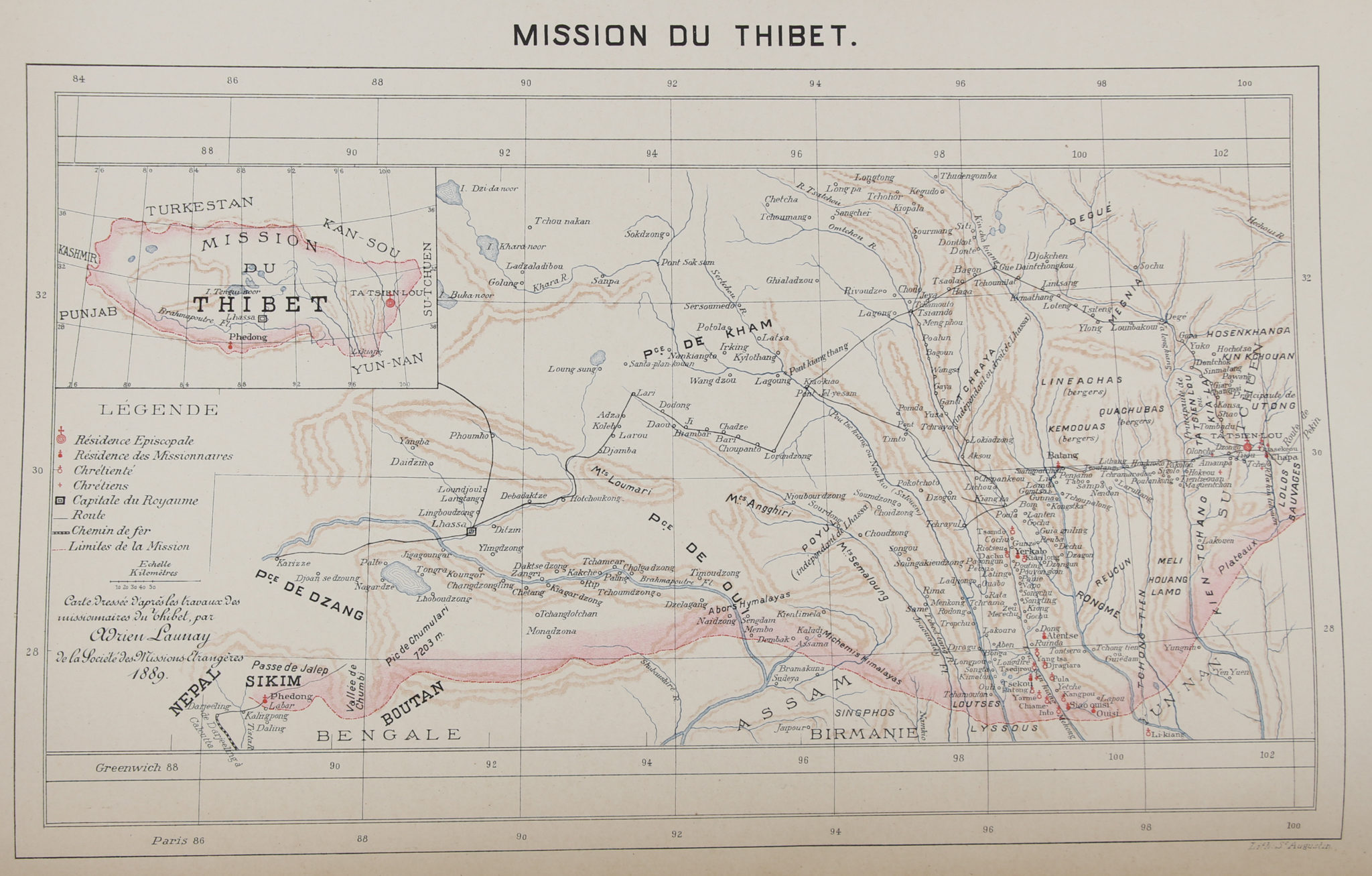
- The Tibetan Mission included Sichuanese Tibet, Yunnanese Tibet, Koksang, and until 1929, Sikkim and Bhutan (now Diocese of Darjeeling). Map prepared by Adrien Launay, 1889.

The Diocese of Kangding (formerly spelled Kangting; Latin: Dioecesis Camtimensis; Chinese: 天主教康定教區) is a Latin Catholic diocese in the ecclesiastical province of the Metropolitan of Chongqing in western China, but still dependent on the Congregation for the Evangelization of Peoples.

Established on March 27, 1846 as the Apostolic Vicariate of Lhasa for the Mission of Tibet, its episcopal see is located in the city of Kangding, Sichuanese Tibet, known to the Tibetans as Dartsedo or Tatsienlu. It has been vacant since 1962.

== Territory ==
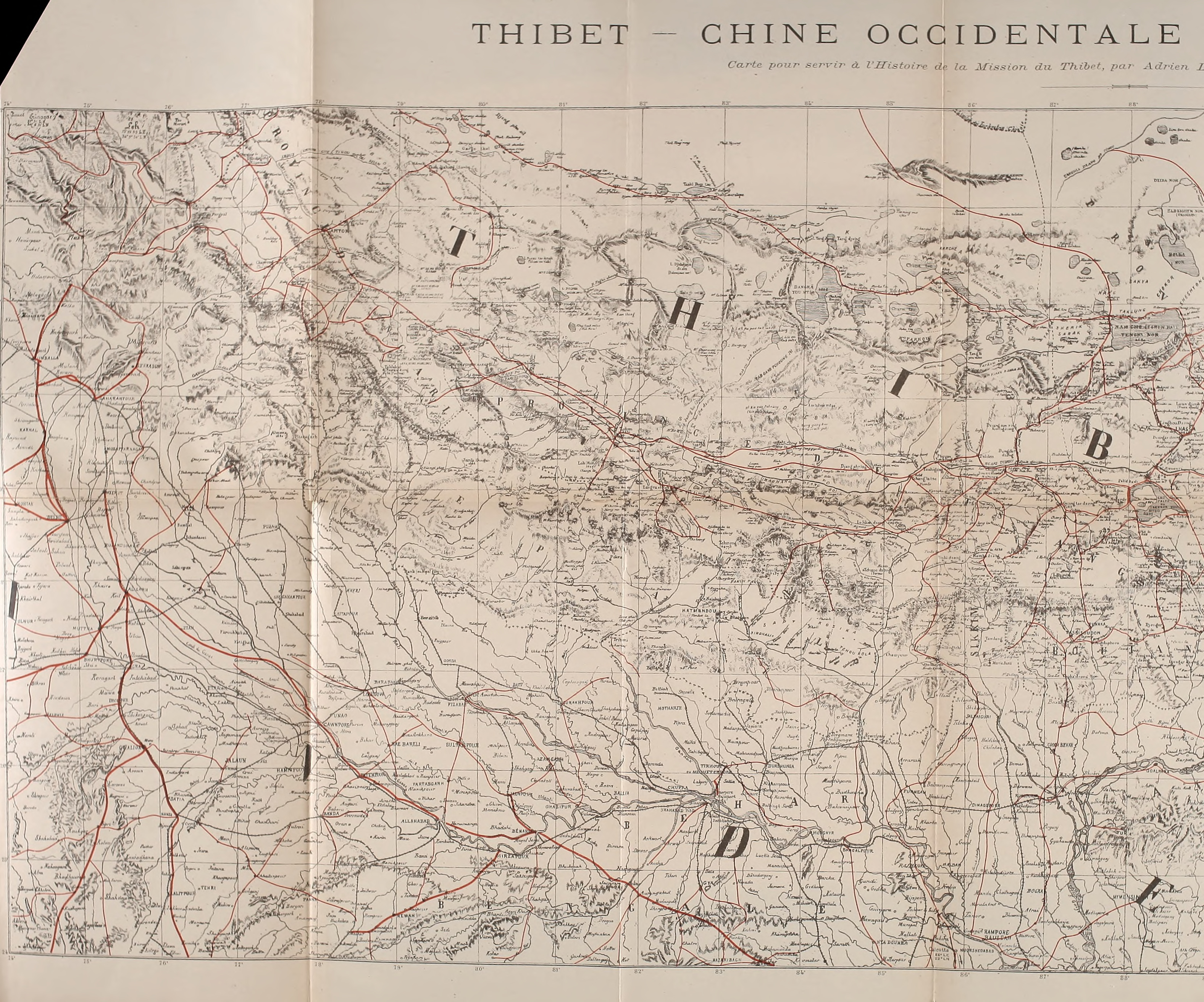
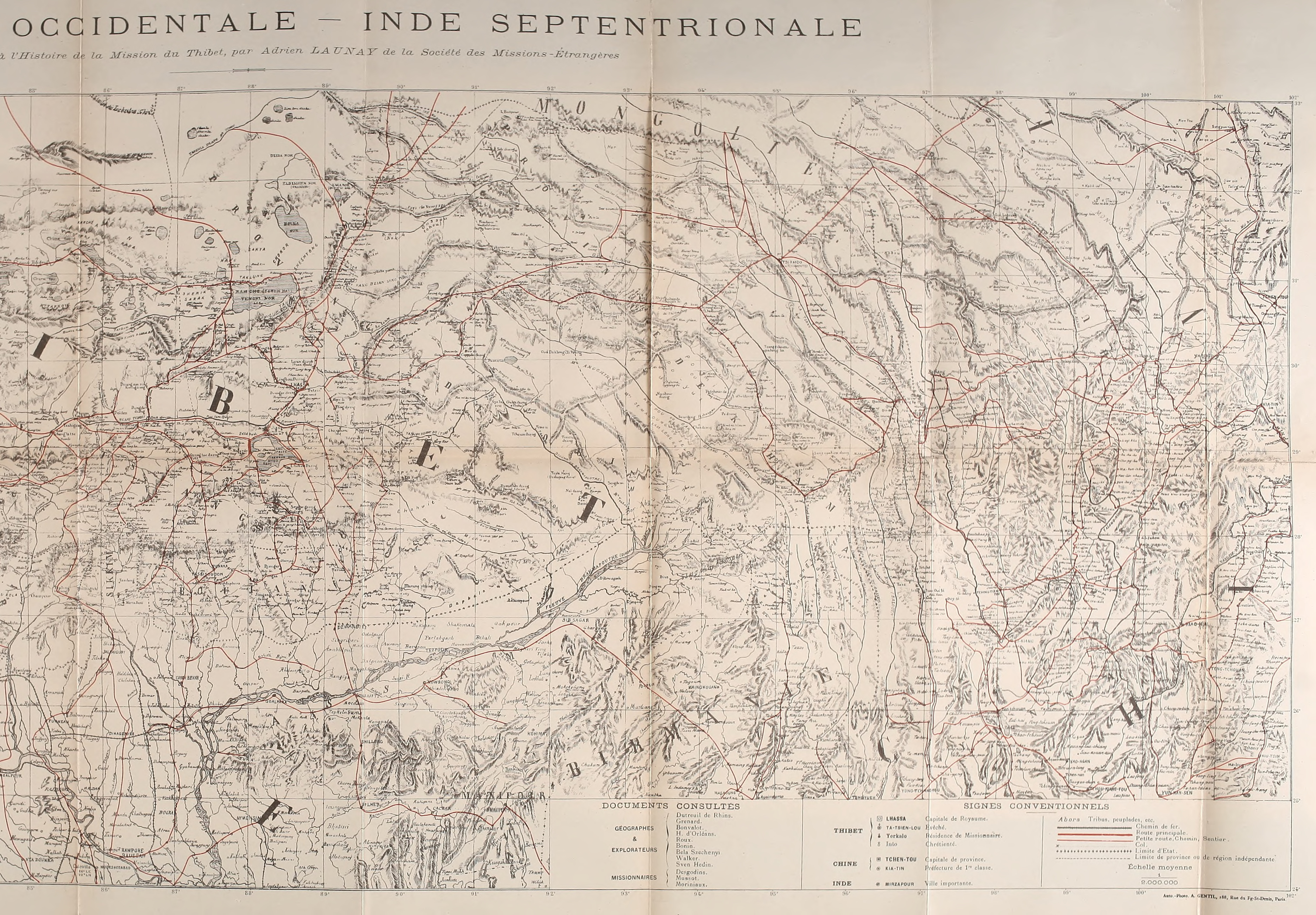
Map of the Tibetan Mission from Histoire de la Mission du Thibet by Adrien Launay, 1903

The diocese includes the western part of Sichuan province and theoretically the entire Tibet Autonomous Region. Specifically, it covers the two historical regions of Kham and Sikkim (the latter with its headquarters in Darjeeling, separated from the Apostolic Vicariate of Tibet in 1929); Western Sichuan such as the counties and cities of Garzê Tibetan Autonomous Prefecture: Batang, Dapba, Draggo, Garzê, Jagsam, Litang, Nyachukha, Nyagrong, Pelyül, Qagchêng, Rongzhag, Sêrxü, Tatsienlu, Tawu; two counties in Ngawa Tibetan and Qiang Autonomous Prefecture: Quqên and Tsanlha; Hanyuan County in Central Sichuan; counties in the former province of Hsikang: Dengke, Enda, Kemai, Ningjing, Taizhao; two counties and one city of Dêqên Tibetan Autonomous Prefecture in northwestern Yunnan Province: Dêqên, Shangri-La and Weixi; and counties and cities of the Tibet Autonomous Region: Chagyab and Gonjo (Chamdo), Gonggar (Lhoka), and Lhari (Nagqu).

The Diocese of Kangding is bordered by the Diocese of Chengdu and Diocese of Jiading to the east; Diocese of Jammu–Srinagar and Diocese of Simla and Chandigarh to the west; Apostolic Prefecture of Xining and Diocese of Qinzhou to the northeast; Apostolic Prefecture of Xinjiang-Urumqi to the northwest; Diocese of Ningyuan, Diocese of Dali and Diocese of Myitkyina to the southeast; Diocese of Darjeeling and Diocese of Itanagar to the south; and Apostolic Vicariate of Nepal and Eparchy of Bijnor to the southwest.

== History ==
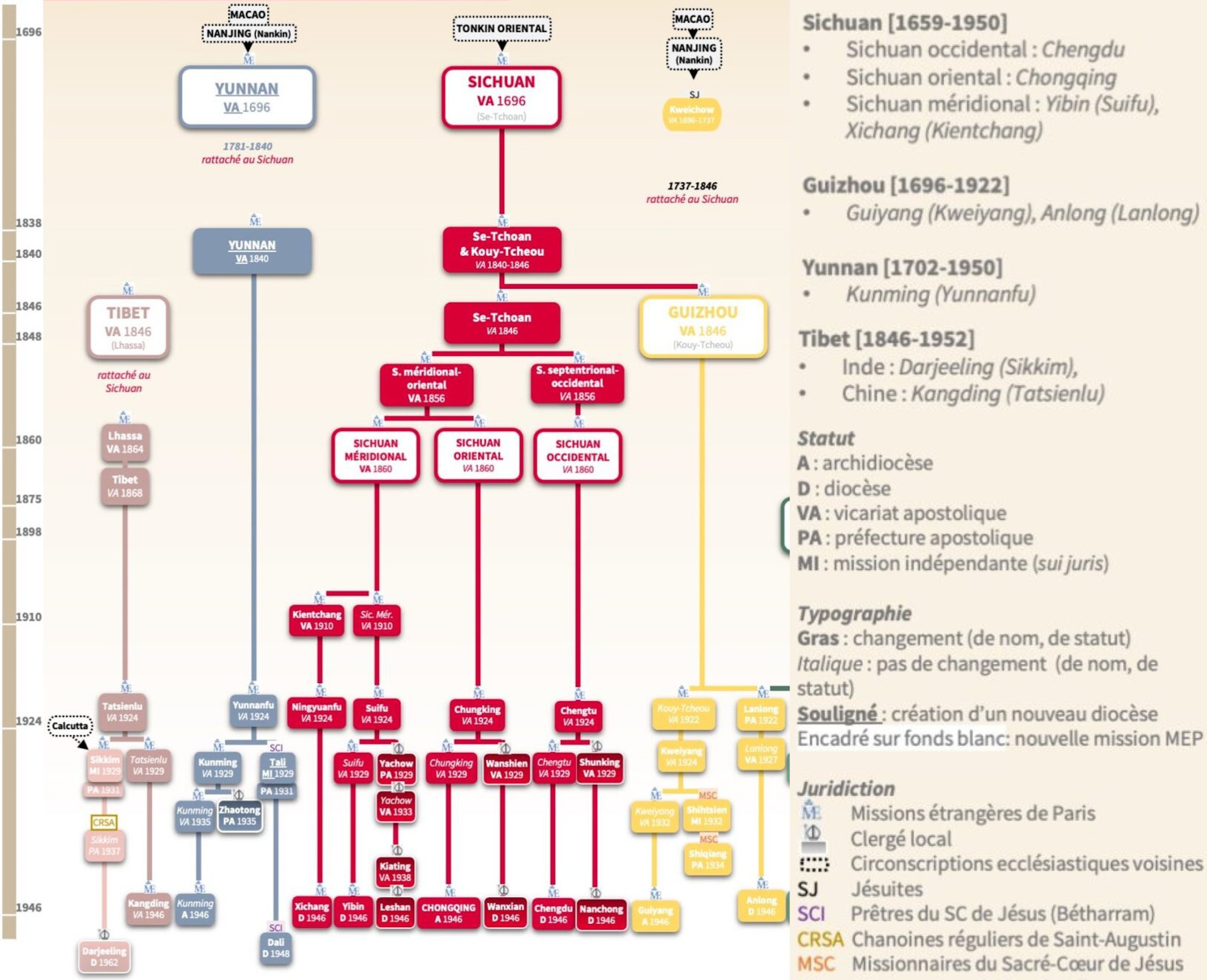
Genealogy of MEP ecclesiastical jurisdiction in Sichuan (Szechwan), with its three attachments: Tibet, Yunnan and Guizhou (Kweichow).

- Established on March 27, 1846 as Apostolic Vicariate of Lhasa (after its Tibetan see, Lhasa), on territory split off from the then Apostolic Vicariate of Szechwan and Apostolic Vicariate of Tibet-Hindustan
- Renamed on July 28, 1868 as Apostolic Vicariate of Tibet (Vicariatus Apostolicus Thibetanus)
- Renamed on December 3, 1924 as Apostolic Vicariate of Tatsienlu (Vicariatus Apostolicus de Tatsienlu)
- Lost territory on 15 December 1929 to establish the then Mission sui iuris of Sikkim (now Diocese of Darjeeling)
- Promoted on April 11, 1946 and renamed after its see as Diocese of Kangting (Dioecesis Camtimensis)

== Ordinaries ==
All Roman Rite.

Apostolic Vicars of Lhasa

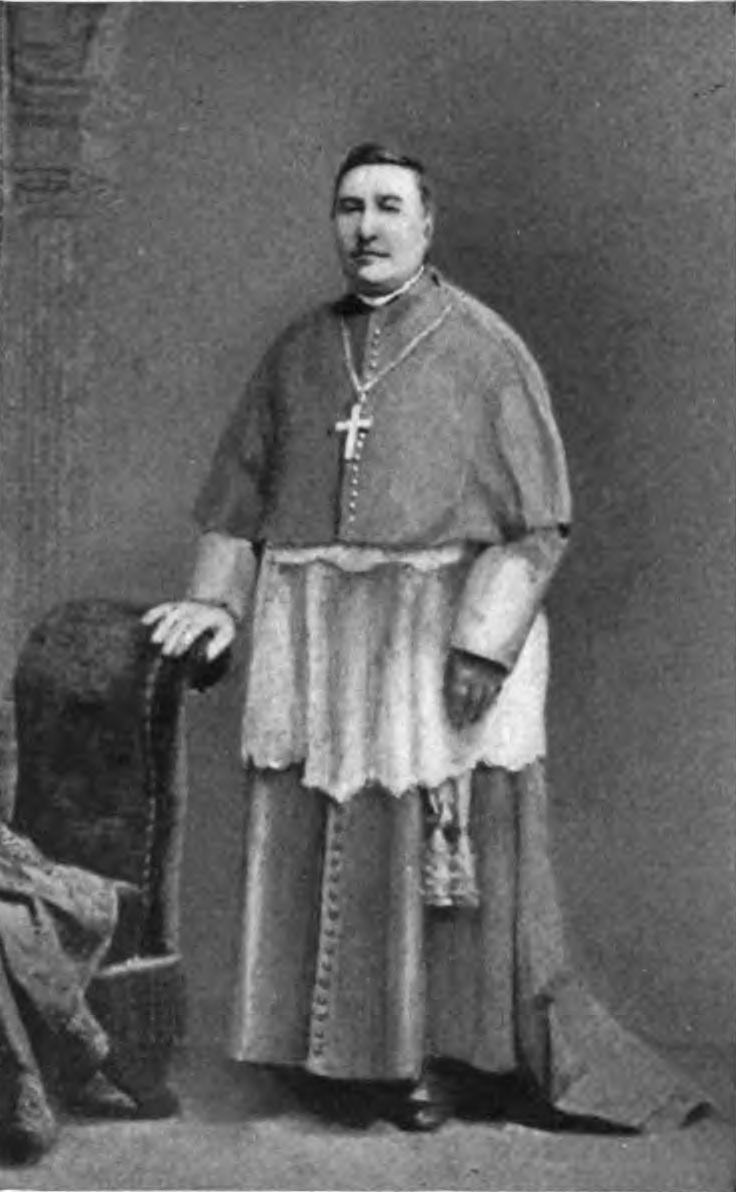
Ignazio Persico

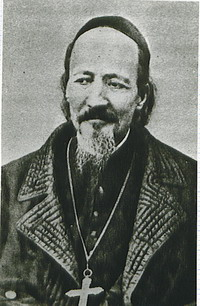
Léon Thomine Desmazures

First Apostolic Vicars of Lhasa
- Ignazio Persico (Capuchin Franciscans, abbreviated O.F.M. Cap.) (1856.12.19 – 1860), Titular Bishop of Gratianopolis in Mauretania Caesariensis (1854.03.08 – 1870.03.11); later Bishop of Savannah (USA) (1870.03.20 – 1874.06.20), Titular Bishop of Bolina (1874.06.23 – 1879.03.26) & Coadjutor Bishop of Aquino, Sora e Pontecorvo (Italy) (1874.06.20 – 1879.03.26), succeeded as Bishop of Aquino, Sora e Pontecorvo (1879.03.26 – 1887.03.14), then Titular Archbishop of Tamiathis (1887.03.14 – 1893.01.16), Secretary of Sacred Congregation of the Propagation of the Faith (1891.06.13 – 1893.05.30), created Cardinal-Priest of San Pietro in Vincoli (1893.01.19 – 1895.12.07), Prefect of the Roman Congregation for Indulgences and Sacred Relics (1893.05.30 – 1895.12.07)
- Jacques-Léon Thomine-Desmazures (Paris Foreign Missions Society, abbreviated M.E.P.) (1857.02.17 – 1864.08.28), Titular Bishop of Synopolis (1856.04.04 – 1869.01.25)

Apostolic Vicars of Tibet

- Joseph-Marie Chauveau, M.E.P. (1864.09.09 – death 1877.12.21), Titular Bishop of Sebastopolis (1846.03.27 – 1877.12.21), formerly Coadjutor Apostolic Vicar of Yunnan (1846.03.27 – 1864.09.09)
- Félix Biet, M.E.P. (1878.08.27 – death 1901.09.09), Titular Bishop of Diana (1878.07.23 – 1901.09.09)
- Pierre-Philippe Giraudeau, M.E.P. (1901.09.09 – 1924.12.03 see below), Titular Bishop of Daphnusia (1897.02.15 – 1941.11.13), succeeding as former Coadjutor Vicar Apostolic of Tibet (1897.02.15 – 1901.09.09)

Apostolic Vicars of Tatsienlu

- Pierre-Philippe Giraudeau, M.E.P. (see above; 1924.12.03 – retired 1936.08.09)
- Pierre-Sylvain Valentin, M.E.P. (1936.08.06 – 1946.04.11 see below), Titular Bishop of Zeugma in Syria (1926.11.16 – 1946.04.11), succeeding as former Coadjutor Vicar Apostolic of Tatsienlu (1926.11.11 – 1936.08.06)

Suffragan Bishop of Kangting

- Pierre-Sylvain Valentin, M.E.P. (see above; 1946.04.11 – death 1962.01.07)

Suffragan Bishop of Kangding

- John Baptist Wang Ruohan, (underground bishop, 1989.11 – ?)
- indefinite vacancy

== See also ==
- Anglican Diocese of Szechwan
- Gospel Church, Kangding
- Our Lady of the Sacred Heart Church, Yerkalo
- Maurice Tornay – Swiss missionary ministering in the Diocese of Kangding

== Sources and External links and References ==
- "Diocese of Kangding". gcatholic.org.
- "Diocese of Kangding [Kangting]". catholic-hierarchy.org.

Kanding
