= Diocese of Qinzhou =

Roman Catholic diocese in China

Diocese of Qinzhou Dioecesis Zinceuvensis 天主教秦州教區 天主教秦州教区

Location
- Country: China
- Ecclesiastical province: Lanzhou
- Metropolitan: Lanzhou

Statistics
- Area: 45,000 km^{2} (17,000 sq mi)
- Population: Total; Catholics: (as of 1950); 2,500,000; 8,548 (0.3%)

Information
- Denomination: Catholic Church
- Sui iuris church: Latin Church
- Rite: Roman Rite
- Established: April 28, 1905 (as apostolic vicariate)
- Cathedral: Dongguan Cathedral, Tianshui
- Patron saint: Fidelis of Sigmaringen

Current leadership
- Bishop: John Wang Ruowang
- Metropolitan Archbishop: Joseph Han Zhihai

The Diocese of Qinzhou (formerly spelled Tsinchow; Latin: Dioecesis Zinceuvensis; Chinese: 天主教秦州教區), also known as Diocese of Tianshui according to the government controlled Catholic Patriotic Association, is a Latin Catholic diocese located in Qinzhou, Tianshui, Gansu (formerly Kansu) in the ecclesiastical province of Lanzhou in western China. It was established on April 28, 1905 as an apostolic vicariate.

The Diocese of Qinzhou is bordered by the Diocese of Fengxiang and Diocese of Hanzhong to the east, Archdiocese of Lanzhou to the northwest, Diocese of Pingliang to the northeast, Diocese of Kangding to the southwest, and Diocese of Chengdu to the southeast.

== History ==
- April 28, 1905: Established as Apostolic Vicariate of Southern Kansu from the Apostolic Vicariate of Kansu
- March 8, 1922: Renamed as Apostolic Vicariate of Eastern Kansu
- December 3, 1924: Renamed as Apostolic Vicariate of Tsinchow
- April 11, 1946.04.11: Promoted as Diocese of Tsinchow

== Bishops ==
Vicars Apostolic of Southern Kansu

- Everard Ter Laak, C.I.C.M. (1905 – May 6, 1914)
- Constantin Daems, C.I.C.M. (1914–1922)

Vicar Apostolic of Tsinchow

- Salvador-Pierre Walleser (March 28, 1922 – January 1, 1946)

Bishop of Tsinchow

- Peter Gratian Grimm, O.F.M. Cap. (April 21, 1949 – November 17, 1959)

Bishops of Qinzhou

- Casimir Wang Mi-lu (underground bishop; January 28, 1981 – July 24, 2003)
- Acting Bishop John Wang Ruowang (underground bishop; July 24, 2003 – August 19, 2011)
- John Wang Ruowang (underground bishop; August 19, 2011 – present)
