= Archdiocese of Kunming =

Roman Catholic archdiocese in China

Coordinates: 25.0667°N 102.6830°E

Archdiocese of Kunming Archidioecesis Coenmimensis 天主教昆明總教區 天主教昆明总教区
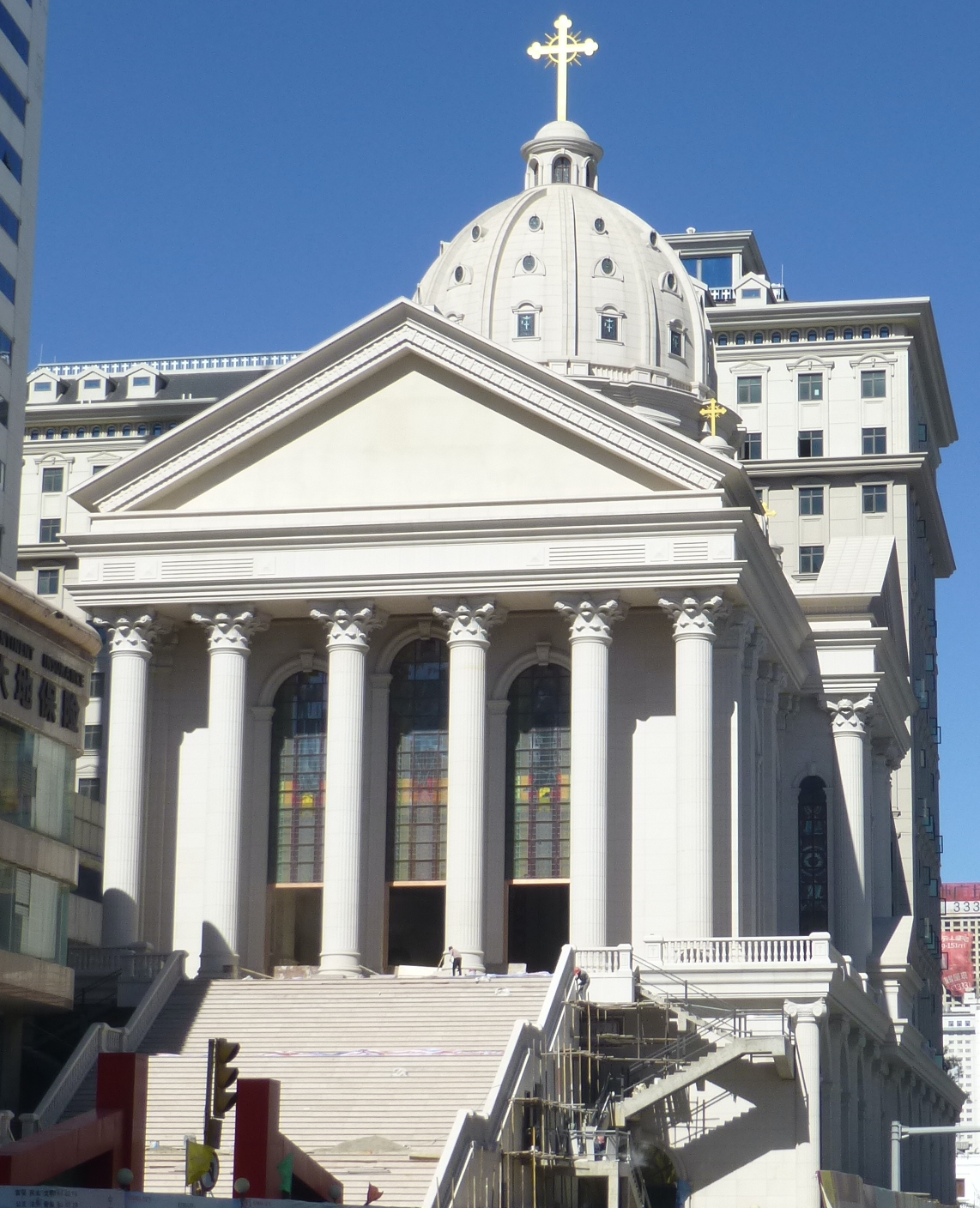
- Former Sacred Heart of Jesus Cathedral, Kunming, demolished in 2021

Location
- Country: China
- Ecclesiastical province: Kunming

Statistics
- Area: 150,000 km^{2} (58,000 sq mi)
- Population: Total; Catholics: (as of 1950); 8,000,000; 10,025 (0.1%)

Information
- Denomination: Catholic Church
- Sui iuris church: Latin Church
- Rite: Roman Rite
- Cathedral: Sacred Heart of Jesus Cathedral, Kunming

Current leadership
- Pope: Leo XIV
- Metropolitan Archbishop: Sede vacante

Map
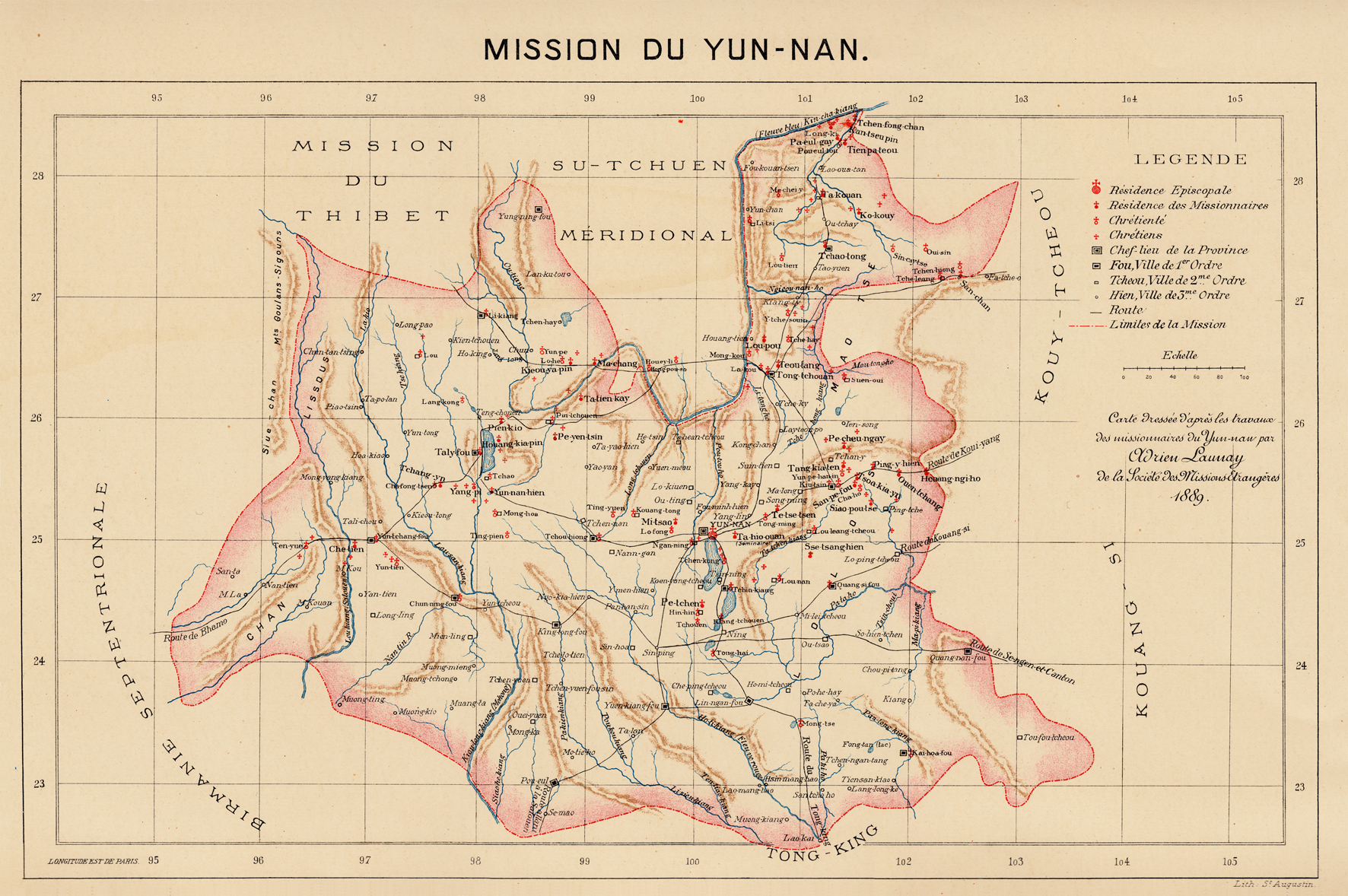
- Map of the Yunnan Mission, prepared by Adrien Launay, 1889.

The Archdiocese of Kunming (Latin: Archidioecesis Coenmimensis; Chinese: 天主教昆明總教區) is an archdiocese located in the city of Kunming, provincial capital of Yunnan, southwestern China.

== Overview ==
The Archdiocese has not had a legitimate, Vatican-appointed archbishop since 1952, when French Archbishop Alexandre Derouineau was expelled from China in the aftermath of the Chinese Communist Revolution.

The government of the People's Republic of China installed Father Kong Lingzhong as archbishop in 1962 and Father Joseph Ma Yinglin as archbishop in 2006. Neither government appointment is considered legitimate by the Vatican since they were not appointed by the papacy.

In 2000, the Vatican appointed Lawrence Zhang Wen-Chang as Apostolic Administrator of Kunming. He served until his death in 2012.

== History ==
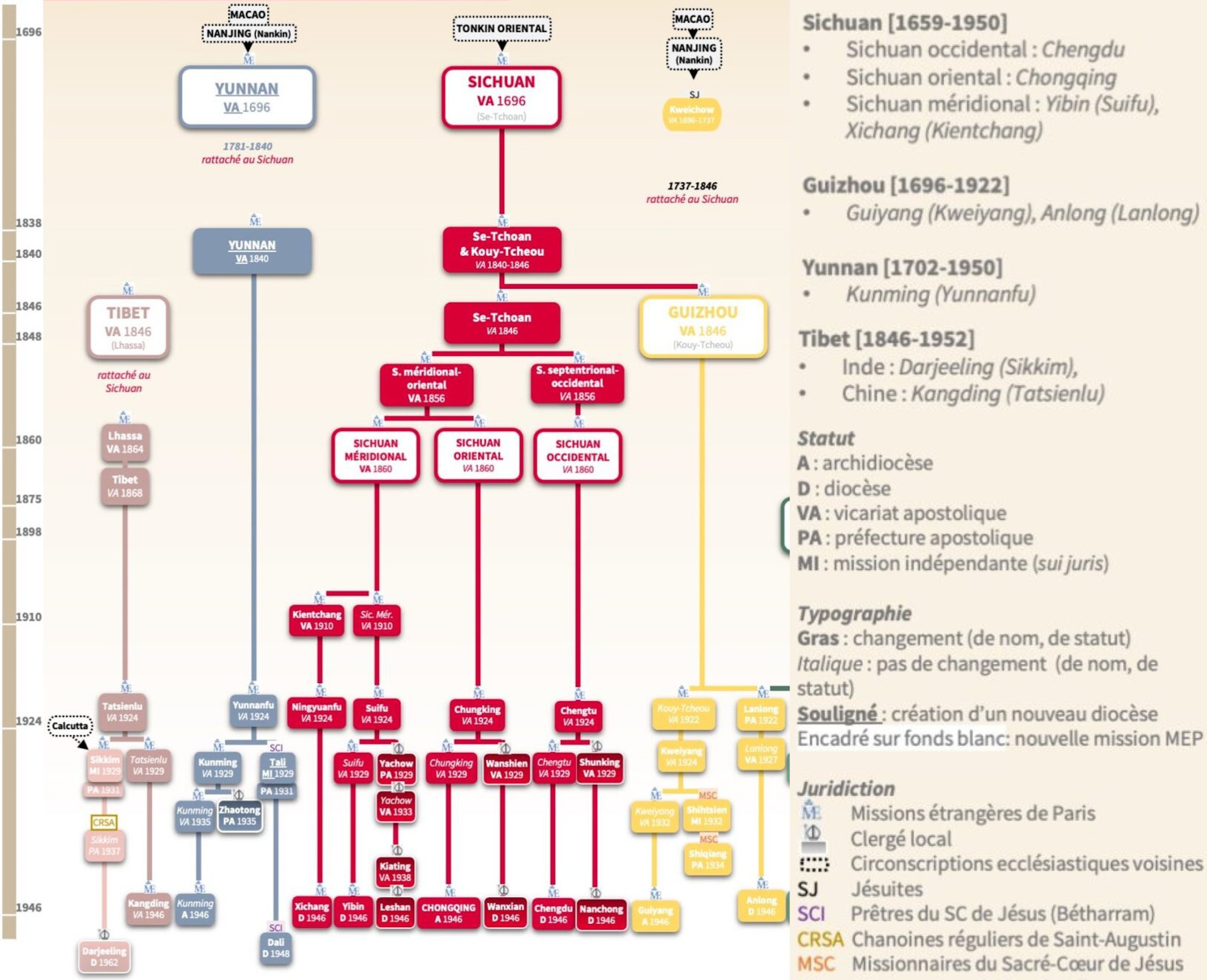
Genealogy of MEP ecclesiastical jurisdiction in Szechwan, with its three attachments: Tibet, Yunnan and Kweichow.

The first Catholics in Yunnan were refugees fleeing from the Massacre of Sichuan (Szechwan) perpetrated by Zhang Xianzhong in the 1640s. In 1658, a significant number of Catholics retreated to Kunming with the Yongli Emperor, whose family and court were converted to Catholicism by the German Jesuit Andreas Xavier Koffler. After the emperor's death, most of the Catholics settled in Kunming.

- 1687: Established as Apostolic Vicariate of Kwangtung-Kwangsi-Yunnan from the Apostolic Vicariate of Fokien
- 1696: Renamed as Apostolic Vicariate of Yunnan
- 1715: Suppressed to the Apostolic Vicariate of Szechwan
- August 28, 1840: Restored as Apostolic Vicariate of Yunnan from the Apostolic Vicariate of Szechwan
- December 8, 1924: Renamed as Apostolic Vicariate of Yunnanfu
- April 11, 1946: Promoted as Metropolitan Archdiocese of Kunming

== Bishops ==
Vicar Apostolic of Kwangtung-Kwangsi-Yunnan

- Francisco Varo, O.P. (January 31, 1687 – 1687)

Vicars Apostolic of Yunnan

- Philibert LeBlanc, M.E.P. (1696–1720)
- Joachim-Enjobert de Martiliat, M.E.P. (October 2, 1739 – 1752)
- Suppressed, remained dependent upon the Apostolic Vicariate of Szechwan (1715–1840)
- Joseph Ponsot, M.E.P. (January 21, 1841 – November 17, 1880)
- Jean-Joseph Fenouil, M.E.P. (July 29, 1881 – January 10, 1907)

Vicars Apostolic of Yunnanfu

- Charles de Gorostarzu, M.E.P. (October 21, 1907 – March 27, 1933)
- Georges-Marie de Jonghe d'Ardoye, M.E.P. (later Archbishop) (May 3, 1933 – October 16, 1938)
- Jean Larregain, M.E.P. (June 13, 1939 – May 2, 1942)
- Alexandre-Joseph-Charles Derouineau, M.E.P. (later Archbishop) (December 8, 1943 – April 11, 1946)

Archbishops of Kunming

- Alexandre-Joseph-Charles Derouineau, M.E.P. (April 11, 1946 – September 30, 1973)
- Louis He Dezong, Apostolic Administrator (1952–2000)
- Uncanonical, i.e. without papal mandate: Paul Kong Lingzhong (January 21, 1962 – October 28, 1992)
- Lawrence Zhang Wen-Chang, Apostolic Administrator (2000 – February 5, 2012)
- Uncanonical, i.e. without papal mandate: Joseph Ma Yinglin (April 30, 2006 –)

== Suffragan dioceses ==
- Dali

== See also ==
- Catholic Church in Sichuan
- Apostolic Prefecture of Zhaotong
- Archdiocese of Guiyang

== Sources ==
- GCatholic.org
- Catholic Hierarchy
- Archdiocese website (Chinese)
