= Nicholas Han Jide =

- Bishop of the Roman Catholic Diocese of Pingliang
- Church: St. Joseph's Church
- Archdiocese: Roman Catholic Archdiocese of Lanzhou
- Diocese: Roman Catholic Diocese of Pingliang
- Installed: 1999
- Predecessor: Philippe Ji Ma

Orders
- Ordination: September 19, 1996 by Philippe Ji Ma

Personal details
- Born: 1940 (age 85–86) China
- Denomination: Roman Catholic

Nicholas Han Jide (simplified Chinese: 韩纪德; traditional Chinese: 韓紀德; pinyin: Hán Jìdé; born 1940) is a Chinese Catholic priest and Bishop of the Diocese of Pingliang since 1999. He is a member of the Standing Committee of Catholic Patriotic Association.

== Biography ==
Nicholas Han Jide was born in China in 1940. He was ordained a priest at the St. Joseph's Church in Qingyang on September 19, 1996, as a member of the Underground Church by Philippe Ji Ma, Bishop of Pingliang. On September 5, 1999, he became Bishop of Pingliang. He was replaced by Pope Benedict XVI.

Catholic Church titles
Previous: Philippe Ji Ma	Bishop of the Roman Catholic Diocese of Pingliang; 1999	Incumbent
