= Olav Espegren =

Olav Espegren (1879–1948) was a Norwegian missionary affiliated with the Norwegian Lutheran Mission. After attending the mission school in Norway, he was sent as a missionary to China in 1902.

In 1904 he established the mission station in Nanyang in southwestern Henan, as part of the Norwegian Lutheran China Mission's mission field, with was centered at Laohekou, which was situated south to the border of the neighboring province of Hubei. He was the overseer of his locality's mission field during the national turmoil that created the lawless and fractioning states in 1927.

In his final years in China, he was weakened by disease. Due to the outbreak of the Chinese Civil War in Kunming, he and other missionaries had to flee over the Himalayas to India and they returned to Norway for the last time in 1946.
