= Paul Francis Zhang Mingqian =

Chinese priest, doctor and prisoner for faith (1917-2005)

- Bishop of the Roman Catholic Diocese of Yichang
- Church: Cathedral of St. Francis in Yichang
- Province: Hubei
- Diocese: Roman Catholic Diocese of Yichang
- Installed: 1959
- Term ended: 2005
- Predecessor: Noël Gubbels
- Successor: Francis Lü Shouwang

Orders
- Ordination: 1944

Personal details
- Born: October 26, 1917 Jingmen, Hubei, China
- Died: July 24, 2005 (aged 87) Yichang, Hubei, China
- Denomination: Roman Catholic

Chinese name
- Traditional Chinese: 張鳴謙
- Simplified Chinese: 张鸣谦
Transcriptions
Standard Mandarin
- Hanyu Pinyin: Zhāng Míngqiān

Paul Francis Zhang Mingqian (Chinese: 张鸣谦; October 26, 1917 – July 24, 2005) was a Chinese Catholic priest, Franciscan, doctor, prisoner for faith. He was recognized as a legal bishop by both the Holy See and the Chinese government.

== Biography ==
He came from a Catholic family from Jingmen, Hubei. In 1938 he joined the Franciscan High Priest Seminary at the Roman Catholic Archdiocese of Hankou. In 1944, he was ordained a priest and returned to the Roman Catholic Diocese of Yichang. In addition, he received a medical education and was a doctor.

In 1947, he founded a clinic in Jingmen, where he was also a parish priest. After the advent of Communist rule, he worked at the local hospital. In 1958 or 1959, the Catholic Patriotic Association chose him as its Bishop of the Roman Catholic Diocese of Yichang. On August 15, 1959, he received the episcopal consecration at the hands of the excommunicated anti-Bishop Hankou Bernardin Dong Guangqing OFM. Accepting sacra without the consent of the Pope, Zhang was excommunicated from church. In later years, however, he was reconciled with the Pope and received the approval of the Holy See.

During the Cultural Revolution, he was sentenced to reeducation through work, but thanks to his medical education, he avoided the camp and was punished while working in the hospital in Yichang. Released in 1978, he returned to the diocese, which he led until his death in 2005. At the same time, until 1982, he worked as a physician, transferring his earnings to the seminarians he initially taught personally. He also practiced afterwards giving medical advice to sick priests and the faithful.

Catholic Church titles
Previous: Noël Gubbels	Bishop of the Roman Catholic Diocese of Yichang; 1959-2005	Next: Francis Lü Shouwang
