= Roman Catholic Diocese of Yichang =

Roman Catholic diocese in China

Diocese of Yichang Dioecesis Iciamensis 天主教宜昌教区
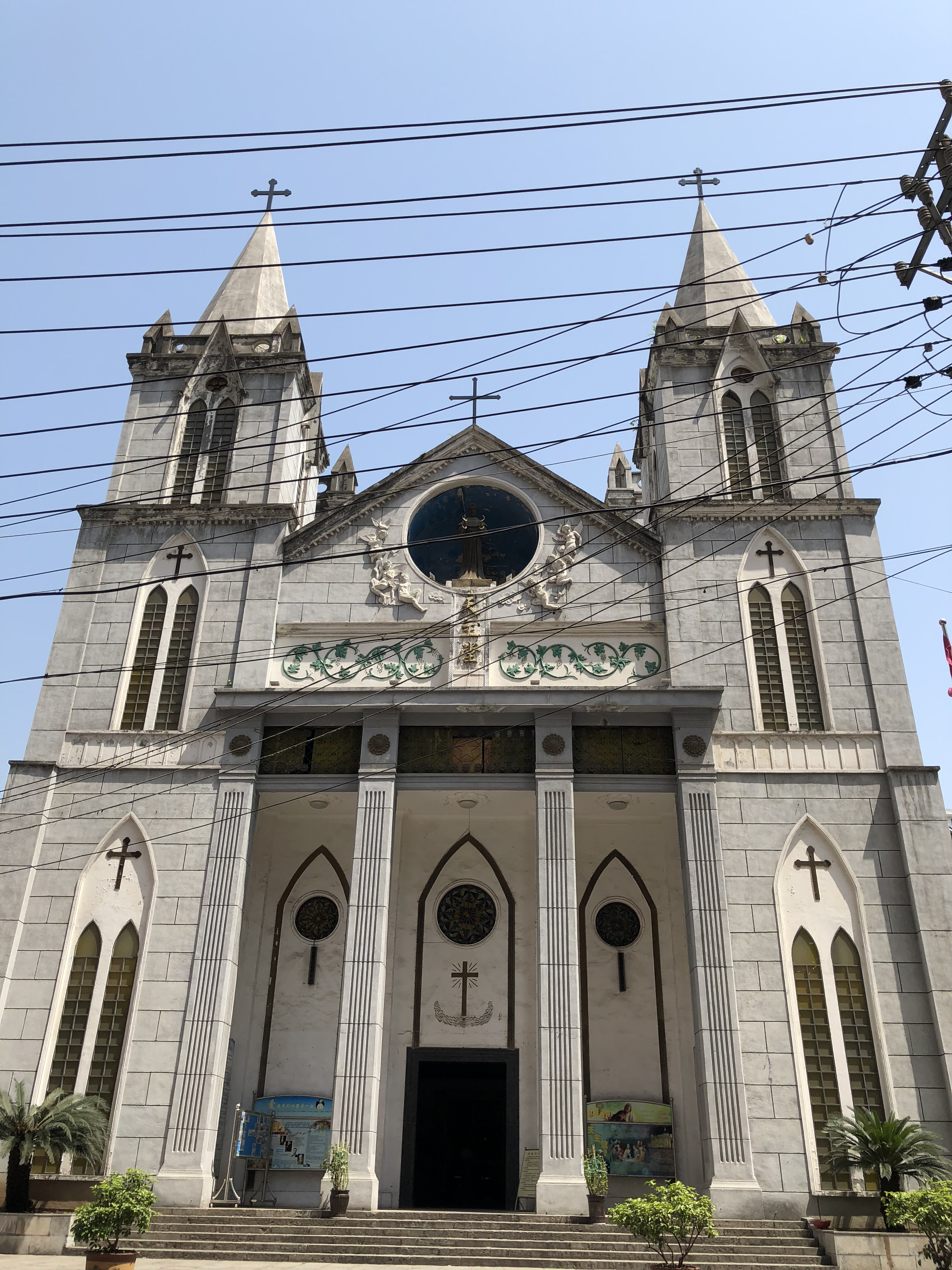

Location
- Country: China
- Ecclesiastical province: Hankou
- Metropolitan: Hankou

Statistics
- Area: 28,000 km^{2} (11,000 sq mi)
- Population: Total; Catholics: (as of 2008); 4,039,000; 30,000 (0.74%)

Information
- Rite: Latin Rite
- Cathedral: Cathedral of St. Francis in Yichang

Current leadership
- Pope: Francis
- Bishop: Sede Vacante
- Metropolitan Archbishop: Sede Vacante

The Roman Catholic Diocese of Yichang/Ichang (Latin: Iciamen(sis), Chinese: 宜昌) is a suffragan Latin diocese in the ecclesiastical province of the Metropolitan Archbishopric of Hankou in central China, yet depends on the missionary Roman Congregation for the Evangelization of Peoples.

Its episcopal see is the Cathedral of St. Francis in the city of Yichang, Hubei province. No statistics available. Vacant since 2012.

== History ==
- Established on September 2, 1870 as Apostolic Vicariate of Southwestern Hupeh 湖北南境, on territory split off from the then Apostolic Vicariate of Hupeh 湖北
- Renamed on December 3, 1924 after its see as Apostolic Vicariate of Yichang 宜昌
- Lost territories twice : on 1936.07.07 to establish the Apostolic Prefecture of Shashi 沙市 and on 1938.06.14 to establish the then Apostolic Vicariate of Shinan 施南
- Promoted on April 11, 1946: as Diocese of Yichang 宜昌.

== Episcopal ordinaries ==
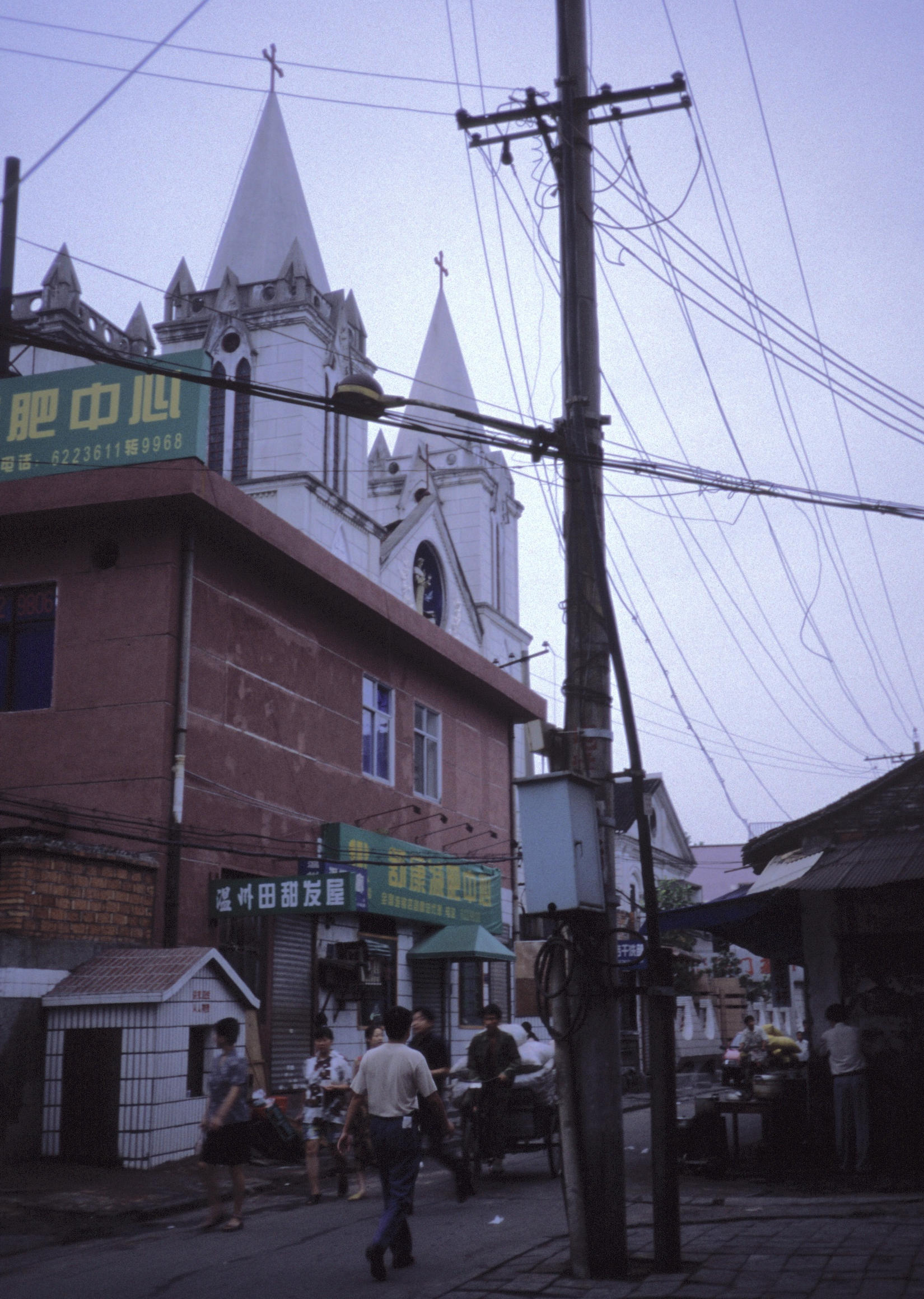
Church steeples over Yichang

(all Roman rite; until 1950 European missionary members of Latin congregations)

Apostolic Vicars of Southwestern Hupeh 湖北南境

- Alessio Maria Filippi, Order of Friars Minor (O.F.M.) (born Italy) (25 January 1876 – death 22 November 1888), Titular Bishop of Cæsarea Paneas (1876.01.25 – 1888.11.22), previously Pro-Vicar Apostolic of Southwestern Hupeh 湖北南境 (1870.08 – 25 January 1876)
- Benjamin Christiaens, O.F.M. (born Belgium) (February 13, 1889 – retired 1899), Titular Bishop of Colophon (1889.02.13 – death 1931.01.07)
- Théotime Matthieu Verhaeghen, O.F.M. (born Belgium) (April 27, 1900 – death July 19, 1904), Titular Bishop of Syene (1900.04.27 – 1904.07.19)
- Modest Everaerts, O.F.M. (born Belgium) (December 24, 1904 – death October 27, 1922), Titular Bishop of Tadama (1904.12.24 – 1922.10.27)
- Johannes Trudo Jans, O.F.M. (born Belgium) (13 December 1923 – 3 December 1924 see below), Titular Bishop of Rhosus (1923.12.13 – death 1929.09.09)

Apostolic Vicars of Yichang 宜昌

- Johannes Trudo Jans, O.F.M. (born Belgium) (see above 3 December 1924 – death 9 September 1929)
- Noël Gubbels, O.F.M. (顧學德) (born Belgium) (March 25, 1930 – April 11, 1946 see below), Titular Bishop of Attuda (1930.03.25 – 1946.04.11)

Suffragan Bishops of Yichang 宜昌

- Noël Gubbels, O.F.M. (顧學德) (see above April 11, 1946 – death November 18, 1950), also Apostolic Administrator of daughter Diocese of Shinan 施南 (China) (1946.04.11 – 1950.11.18)
- Paul Francis Zhang Mingqian O.F.M. (first Chinese incumbent) (1959 – death 2005.07.24), without papal mandate
- Francis Lu Shouwang (2007 - death April 30, 2011).

== See also ==
- List of Catholic dioceses in China

== Sources and external links ==
- GCatholic.org - data for all sections
- Catholic Hierarchy
- Diocese website (Chinese)
- UCAN Diocese Profile
- Carine DUJARDIN, Missionering en Moderniteit. De Belgische minderbroeders in China 1872-1940 [Mission and Modernity. The Belgian Franciscans in China 1872-1940], KADOC-Studies 19, Leuven University Press, 1996, 518 p.
