= Francis Lü Shouwang =

Chinese Roman Catholic bishop (1966 – 2011)

Coat of arms of Francis Lu Shou Wang

Francis Lü Shouwang (吕守旺; 1966 – April 30, 2011) was the Roman Catholic bishop of the Roman Catholic Diocese of Yichang, China.

He was ordained a bishop in 2007 with the approval of Pope Benedict XVI and the Chinese government.

== Notes ==
Catholic Church titles
| Previous: Paul Francis Zhang Mingqian | Bishop of the Roman Catholic Diocese of Yichang; 2007-2011 | Next: TBA |
