= Diocese of Qizhou =

Roman Catholic diocese in China

Diocese of Qizhou Dioecesis Chiceuvensis 天主教蕲州教区

Location
- Country: China
- Ecclesiastical province: Hankou
- Metropolitan: Hankou

Statistics
- Area: 28,000 km^{2} (11,000 sq mi)
- Population: Total; Catholics: (as of 1950); 3,747,308; 15,946 (0.4%)

Information
- Rite: Latin Rite

Current leadership
- Pope: Leo XIV
- Bishop: Sede Vacante
- Metropolitan Archbishop: Sede Vacante

The Roman Catholic Diocese of Qizhou/Kichow/Qichun (Latin: Chiceuven(sis), Chinese: 蘄州, 蘄春) is a diocese located in Qizhou (in modern Hubei) in the ecclesiastical province of Hankou in China.

== History ==
- July 18, 1929: Established as Mission “sui iuris” of Huangzhou 黃州 from the Apostolic Vicariate of Hankou 漢口
- June 1, 1932: Promoted as Apostolic Prefecture of Huangzhou 黃州
- January 27, 1936: Promoted as Apostolic Vicariate of Qizhou 蘄州
- April 11, 1946: Promoted as Diocese of Qizhou 蘄州

== Leadership ==
- Bishops of Qizhou 蘄州 (Roman rite)
  - Bishop Horace Ferruccio Ceól, O.F.M. (June 10, 1948 – June 23, 1990)
- Vicars Apostolic of Qizhou 蘄州 (Roman Rite)
  - Bishop Ruggero Raffaele Cazzanelli, O.F.M. (January 27, 1936 – 1941)
