= Diocese of Shinan =

Roman Catholic diocese in China

Diocese of Shinan Dioecesis Scenanensis 天主教施南教区

Location
- Country: China
- Ecclesiastical province: Hankou
- Metropolitan: Hankou

Information
- Rite: Latin Rite

Current leadership
- Pope: Leo XIV
- Bishop: Sede Vacante
- Metropolitan Archbishop: Sede Vacante

The Roman Catholic Diocese of Shinan/Shíhnan/Enshi (Latin: Scenanen(sis), Chinese: 施南, 恩施) is a (dormant?) suffragan Latin diocese in the ecclesiastical province of the Metropolitan archbishopric of Hankou in central China, yet depends on the missionary Congregation for the Evangelization of Peoples.

Its episcopal see is the city of Shinan (presently known as Enshi). No statistics available. Vacant since its sole incumbent's death in 1942, without apostolic administrator since 1950.

== History ==
- Established on June 14, 1938 as Apostolic Vicariate of Shinan 施南 / Shihnan / de Shinan (Latin), on territory split off from the then Apostolic Vicariate of Yichang 宜昌
- Promoted on April 11, 1946 as Diocese of Shinan 施南 / Enshi 恩施 (中文) / Shíhnan / Scenanen(sis) (Latin).

== Episcopal ordinaries ==
(all Roman rite)

Apostolic Vicar of Shinan 施南

- Father John Baptist Hu Ruo-han (胡若翰) (Chinese) (February 13, 1940 – death 1942), Titular Bishop of Abbir Maius (1940.02.13 – 1942)

Suffragan Bishops of Shinan 施南

- Apostolic Administrator Noël Gubbels, Order of Friars Minor (O.F.M.) (born Belgium) (顧學德) (April 11, 1946 – November 18, 1950), while first Bishop of mother see Yichang 宜昌 (China) (1946.04.11 – 1950.11.18)
- indefinite vacancy

== See also ==
- List of Catholic dioceses in China
