= Casimir Wang Mi-lu =

Chinese Roman Catholic bishop

- Bishop of Qinzhou
- Native name: 王彌祿
- Church: Catholic Church
- Diocese: Diocese of Qinzhou
- In office: 28 January 1981 – 25 July 2003
- Predecessor: Peter Gratian Grimm
- Successor: John Wang Ruowang
- Opposed to: Augustin Zhao Jingnong

Orders
- Ordination: 16 July 1980
- Consecration: January 1981 by Peter Joseph Fan Xueyan

Personal details
- Born: 24 January 1943 Daxiangshan, Gangu County, Gansu, Republic of China
- Died: 14 February 2017 (aged 74) Lanzhou, Gansu, China

Casimir Wang Mi-lu (Chinese: 王彌祿; January 24, 1943 – February 14, 2017) was a Chinese Roman Catholic bishop.

Born in China, Wang Mi-lu was ordained a priest on May 13, 1980. In 1981 he was appointed and on February 20, 1981, was clandestinely consecrated as bishop ordinary of the Roman Catholic Diocese of Qinzhou and served until July 24, 2003.

His younger brother John Baptist Wang Ruo-han is also a clandestine Roman Catholic bishop.
