= Apostolic Prefecture of Zhaotong =

Catholic missionary jurisdiction in China

Apostolic Prefecture of Zhaotong Praefectura Apostolica Chaotungensis 天主教昭通宗座监牧区

Location
- Country: China
- Ecclesiastical province: Yunnan
- Metropolitan: Exempt (immediately subject to the Holy See)

Statistics
- Area: 23,021 km^{2} (8,888 sq mi)
- Population: Total; Catholics: (as of 2024); ▼4,800,000; ▼5,000 ( 0.1%)
- Parishes: 11

Information
- Denomination: Catholic Church
- Sui iuris church: Latin Church
- Rite: Roman Rite
- Established: 8 April 1935
- Cathedral: Cathedral of the Sacred Heart of Jesus

Current leadership
- Pope: Leo XIV
- Prefect Apostolic: Sede vacante

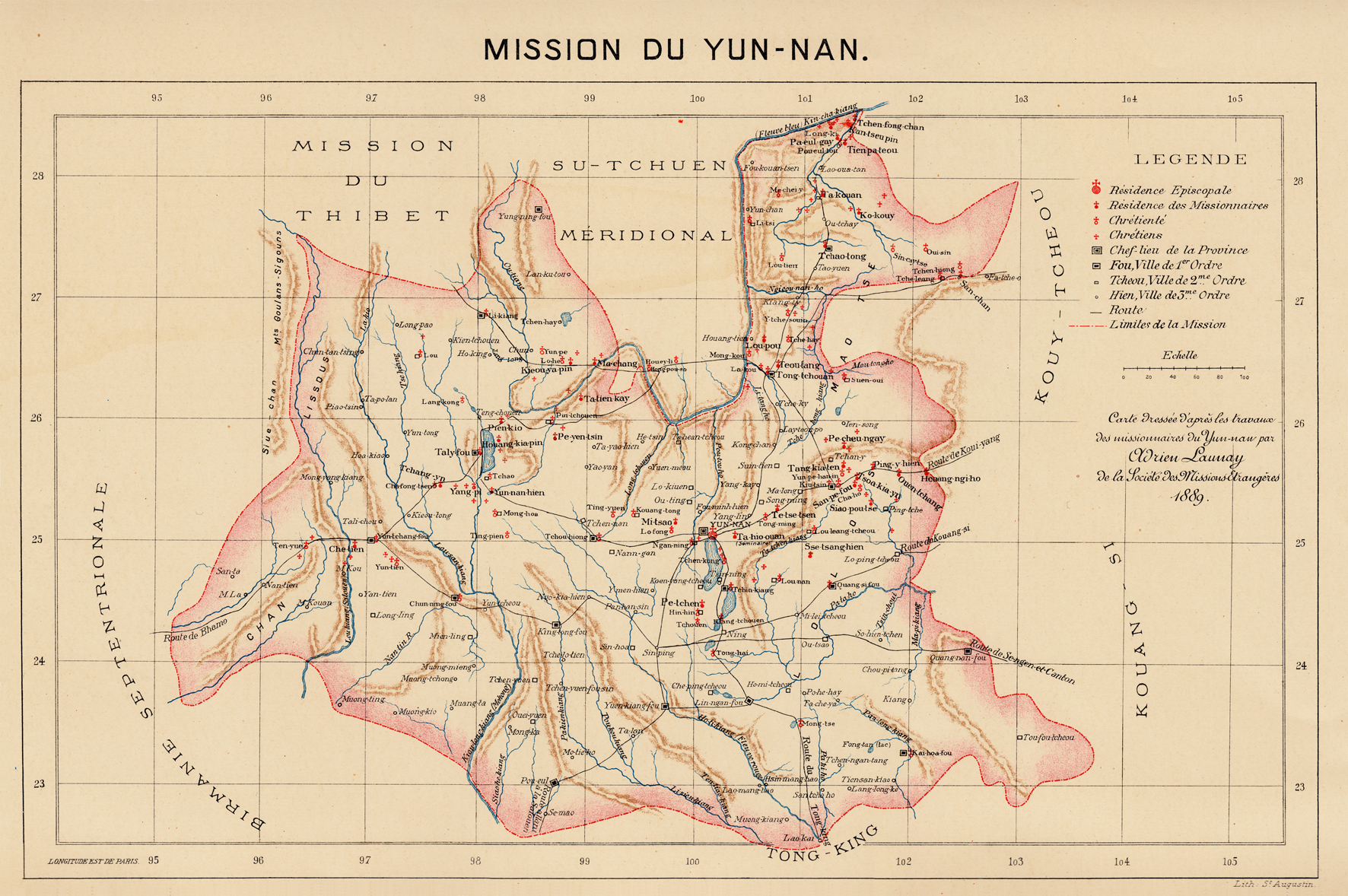
Map of the Yunnan Mission, prepared by Adrien Launay, 1889.

The Apostolic Prefecture of Zhaotong is an Apostolic Prefecture (Latin pre-diocesan missionary jurisdiction, not entitled to a titular bishop) of the Catholic Church, with its seat in the city of Zhaotong (Tchao-tong), in the southwestern Chinese province of Yunnan.

It is exempt, i.e., directly dependent on the Holy See (specifically through the Dicastery for Evangelization), and is not part of any ecclesiastical province.

The prefecture has been vacant since 1982, and has been without an apostolic administrator since 2012.

== History ==
It was established on 8 April 1935 as the Apostolic Prefecture of Zhaotong (Chinese: 昭通; Latin: Praefectura Apostolica Chaotungensis), on territory split off from the Apostolic Vicariate of Yunnanfu.

In 2000, the Vatican appointed Father Lawrence Zhang Wenchang as the Apostolic Administrator of Zhaotong. He served in that position until his death on 5 February 2012. Since then, the prefecture has remained without a superior.

== Ordinaries ==
All ordinaries belong to the Roman Rite.

Apostolic Prefects and Administrators of Zhaotong
Name	Role	Tenure	Notes
Fr. Damian Chen Da-ming (陳達明)	Prefect Apostolic	8 April 1935 – 1939	Retired; died January 1945
Fr. Jozef Kerec (紀勵志), S.D.B.	Apostolic Administrator	1939 – 1951	Held no other prelature
Fr. Stephen Fan Kai-ping (范介平)	Prefect Apostolic	6 July 1951 – 1982	Retired (or died) in 1982
Matthew Chen Mu-shun (陳慕舜)	Uncanonical Bishop	28 March 1988 – 9 April 1997	Consecrated without papal mandate; died in office
Fr. Lawrence Zhang Wenchang (張文昌)	Apostolic Administrator	2000 – 5 February 2012	Concurrently Apostolic Administrator of Kunming and Dali; died in office

== See also ==
- List of Catholic dioceses in China
