= John Wang Ruowang =

- Bishop of the Roman Catholic Diocese of Qinzhou
- Province: Gansu
- Diocese: Roman Catholic Diocese of Qinzhou
- Installed: 2011
- Predecessor: Casimir Wang Mi-lu

Orders
- Ordination: 1983
- Consecration: 2011

Personal details
- Born: 1962 (age 63–64) China
- Denomination: Roman Catholic

John Wang Ruowang (Chinese: 王若望; pinyin: Wāng Ruòwàng; born 1962) is a Chinese Catholic priest and Bishop of the Roman Catholic Diocese of Qinzhou since 2011.

== Biography ==
Wang was born in China in 1962, to a devout Catholic family.

Like many other priests, he experienced a long period of study, after which he was ordained a priest. The Roman Catholic Diocese of Qinzhou left the court in July 2003 after the death of the bishop Casimir Wang Mi-lu. The Holy See assigned priest John Wang Ruowang as Bishop. He accepted the episcopacy with the papal mandate on August 19, 2011.
