= Archdiocese of Hankou =

Roman Catholic archdiocese in Hubei, China

Coordinates: 30.5826°N 114.2901°E

Archdiocese of Hankou Archidioecesis Hancheuvensis 天主教汉口总教区
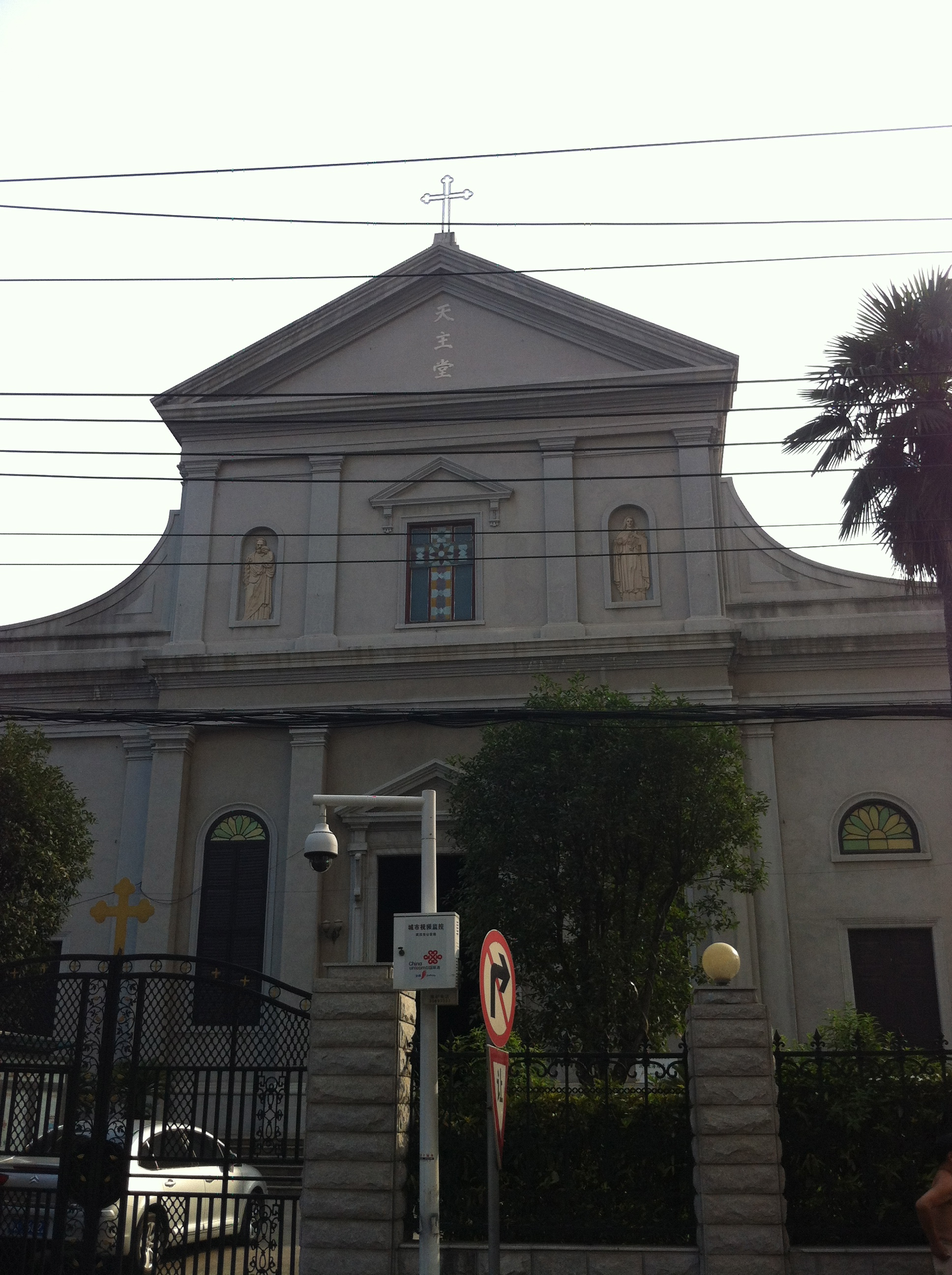
- Cathedral of St Joseph in Wuhan

Location
- Country: China
- Ecclesiastical province: Hankou

Statistics
- Area: 12,120 km^{2} (4,680 sq mi)
- Population: Total; Catholics: (as of 1950); 2,200,000; 35,239 (1.6%)
- Parishes: 25

Information
- Denomination: Catholic Church
- Sui iuris church: Latin Church
- Rite: Roman Rite
- Established: 8 April 1856; 170 years ago
- Cathedral: Cathedral of St Joseph in Wuhan

Current leadership
- Pope: Leo XIV
- Bishop: Francis Cui Qingqi, O.F.M.
- Metropolitan Archbishop: Sede vacante

The Roman Catholic Archdiocese of Hankou (Latin: Hancheuvensis, Chinese: 漢口) is a Latin Rite Metropolitan archdiocese, based in Hankou, Wuhan, Hubei, China.

Its archiepiscopal see is the St. Joseph's Cathedral, in Hankou, Wuhan.

Due to the political situation, since 1961, it has been a vacant, underground archdiocese without apostolic administrator.

== History ==
- Established in 1696 as Apostolic Vicariate of Hupeh and Hunan 湖廣 / Houkouang, on territory split off from the Apostolic Vicariate of Fujian
- Renamed on 8 April 1856 as Apostolic Vicariate of Hupeh 湖北 / Hu-pé, having lost territory to establish Apostolic Vicariate of Hunan 湖南)
- Lost territory on 2 September 1870 to establish Apostolic Vicariate of Southwestern Hupeh 湖北南境
- Renamed on 11 September 1870 as Apostolic Vicariate of Eastern Hupeh, having lost territory to establish Apostolic Vicariate of Northwestern Hupeh 湖北西北)
- Renamed on 12 December 1923 after its see as Apostolic Vicariate of Hankou
- Lost territories again: on 18 July 1929 to establish Mission sui juris of Huangzhou 黃州 and on 17 June 1937 to establish Apostolic Prefecture of Suixian 隨縣
- Promoted on 11 April 1946 as Metropolitan Archdiocese of Hankou

== Ecclesiastical province ==
Its Suffragan sees are:

- Roman Catholic Diocese of Hanyang 漢陽
- Roman Catholic Diocese of Laohekou
- Puqi 蒲圻
- Roman Catholic Diocese of Qizhou 蘄州
- Roman Catholic Diocese of Shinan 施南
- Roman Catholic Diocese of Wuchang 武昌
- Roman Catholic Diocese of Xiangyang 襄陽
- Roman Catholic Diocese of Yichang 宜昌

== Episcopal ordinaries ==
(all Roman Rite)

Apostolic Vicars of Hupeh and Hunan 湖廣

- Giovanni Francesco Nicolai(s) (余宜閣), O.F.M. (20 October 1696 – 27 December 1737), Titular Archbishop of Myra (1712-1737)
- Giacomo Luigi Fontana (馮), M.E.P. (1838 – 11 July 1838), Titular Bishop of Sinita (1817-1838);
- Giuseppe Maria Rizzolati, O.F.M.(30 August 1839 – 8 April 1856), retired, Titular Bishop of Arad (1839-1862)

Apostolic Vicars of Hupeh 湖北東境

- Luigi Celestino Spelta (徐類思 / 徐伯達), Reformed Friars Minor (O.F.M. Ref.) (2 April 1856 – 12 September 1862), Titular Bishop of Thespia (1848-1862)
- Eustachio Vito Modesto Zanoli (明位篤), O.F.M. (12 September 1862 – 2 September 1870 see below), Titular Bishop of Eleutheropolis (1857-1883)

Apostolic Vicars of Eastern Hupeh 湖北東境

- Eustachio Vito Modesto Zanoli (明位篤), O.F.M. (see above 2 September 1870 – 17 May 1883)
- Vincenzo Epifanio Carlassare, O.F.M. Ref. (18 July 1884 – 24 July 1909), Titular Bishop of Madauros (1884-1909)

Apostolic Vicars of Hankou 漢口

- Graziano Génnaro, O.F.M. (24 July 1909 – 19 December 1923), Titular Bishop of Hiericho (1906-1923)
  - Apostolic Administrator Eugenio Massi, O.F.M. (希賢) (1925 – 26 January 1927 see below), Titular Bishop of Joppe (1910-1944)
- Eugenio Massi, O.F.M. (希賢) (see above 26 January 1927 – 10 December 1944)

Metropolitan Archbishops of Hankou 漢口

- Giuseppe Ferruccio Maurizio Rosà (羅錦章), O.F.M. (11 July 1946 – 8 August 1961)
  - uncanonical Bernardine Dong Guang-qing (董光清), O.F.M. (1958 – 1994 see below), first term without papal mandate
- Victor Liu He-de, O.F.M. (18 January 1984 – 10 December 2001)
- Giuseppe Ferruccio Maurizio Rosà (羅錦章), O.F.M. (see above 26 July 1946 – death 8 August 1961), canonical second term with papal mandate
- long vacancy
- Francis Cui Qingqi, O.F.M. (23 June 2021 – Present)

== See also ==
- List of Catholic dioceses in China

== Sources and external links ==
- GCatholic.org - data for all sections
- Catholic Hierarchy
