= Diocese of Laohekou =

Roman Catholic diocese in China

Diocese of Laohekou Dioecesis Laohocheuvensis 天主教老河口教区

Location
- Country: China
- Ecclesiastical province: Hankou
- Metropolitan: Hankou

Statistics
- Area: 30,000 km^{2} (12,000 sq mi)
- Population: Total; Catholics: (as of 1950); 2,500,000; 20,445 (0.8%)

Information
- Rite: Latin Rite

Current leadership
- Pope: Leo XIV
- Bishop: Sede Vacante
- Metropolitan Archbishop: Sede Vacante

The Roman Catholic Diocese of Laohekou/Laohokow (Latin: Laohocheuven(sis), Chinese: 老河口) is a suffragan Latin diocese in the ecclesiastical province of the Metropolitan Archbishopric of Hankou in central China, but depends on the missionary Roman Congregation for the Evangelization of Peoples.

Its episcopal see is located in the city of Laohekou (Hubei).

No statistics available. The see is vacant (?dormant) since 1966, without any Apostolic administrator.

== History ==
- Established on 11 September 1870 as Apostolic Vicariate of Northwestern Hupeh 湖北西北, on territory split off from the then Apostolic Vicariate of Hupeh 湖北
- Renamed on 3 December 1924 as Apostolic Vicariate of Laohekou 老河口 / Laohokow / de Laohokow (Latin)
- Lost territory on 25 May 1936 to establish the Apostolic Prefecture of Xiangyang 襄陽
- Promoted on 11 April 1946 as Diocese of Laohekou 老河口 / Laohokow / Laohocheuven(sis) (Latin).

== Episcopal ordinaries ==
(all Roman Rite; so far European missionary members of Latin congregations)

Apostolic Vicars of Northwestern Hupeh 湖北西北

- Pascal Bili, Friars Minor (O.F.M.) (born Italy) (1876.11.20 – death 1878.05.12), Titular Bishop of Gratianopolis (1876.11.20 – 1878.05.12)
- Ezechias Banci, O.F.M. (born Italy) (1879.09.30 – death 1903.10.08), Titular Bishop of Halicarnassus (1871.05.06 – 1903.10.08), initially as Coadjutor Vicar Apostolic of Southern Hunan 湖南南境 (1871.05.06 – succession 1879.09.30)
- Fabiano Landi, O.F.M. (born Italy)(10 May 1904 – death 30 June 1920), Titular Bishop of Tænarum (1904.05.10 – 1920.06.30)

Apostolic Vicars of Laohekou 老河口

- Ermenegildo Ricci, O.F.M. (born Italy) (21 February 1922 – retired 1929?1930), Titular Bishop of Antipyrgos (1922.02.21 – death 1931.11.23)
- Apostolic Administrator Father Alfonso Maria Corrado Ferrani, O.F.M. (born Italy) (18 October 1930 – 27 January 1932 see below)
- Alfonso Maria Corrado Ferrani, O.F.M. (see above 27 January 1932 – see promoted 11 April 1946 see below)

Suffragan Bishops of Laohekou 老河口

- Alfonso Maria Corrado Ferrani, O.F.M. (see above 11 April 1946 – death 10 March 1966).

== See also ==
- List of Catholic dioceses in China

== Sources and external links ==
- GCatholic.org - data for all sections
- Catholic Hierarchy
