= Kong Lingzhong =

Chinese politician

- 孔令中

Vice-Chairman of the Guizhou Provincial Committee of the Chinese People's Political Consultative Conference
- In office January 2008 – April 2016
- Chairman: Wang Fuyu

Personal details
- Born: October 1953 (age 73) Dongyang, Jinhua, Zhejiang, China
- Party: Chinese Communist Party
- Education: Guizhou University

Kong Lingzhong (Chinese: 孔令中; pinyin: Kǒng Lìngzhōng; born October 1953) is a Chinese politician who spent most of his career in southwest China's Guizhou province. At the height of his career, he served as vice-chairman of the Guizhou Provincial Committee of the Chinese People's Political Consultative Conference (CPPCC). He served three terms as vice-chairman in 2008, 2010 and 2012. As of 2016 he was under investigation by the Chinese Communist Party's internal control body, the Central Commission for Discipline Inspection. Then he was placed on one-year probation within the CCP and was demoted to less responsible jobs.

== Biography ==
Kong was born in Dongyang, Jinhua, Zhejiang in October 1953. During the Cultural Revolution, he was a player in Sichuan opera Troupe of Guiyang. After College Entry Test was resumed in 1978, he entered Guizhou University in March that year, majoring in history at the Department of History, where he graduated in January 1982. After graduation, he was assigned to Guizhou Education College as a teacher. He assumed various posts there, such as deputy director of the Personnel Section, deputy director of the Party Affairs, and director of the Party Affairs. In November 1992 he was transferred to Guiyang Medical College (now Guizhou Medical University), serving as secretary of its Discipline Inspection Commission. In July 2000 he was promoted to become head of the Guizhou Provincial Education Department. He concurrently served as vice-chairman of Guizhou Association for Science and Technology in August 2007. In January 2008 he was promoted again to become vice-chairman of the Guizhou Provincial Committee of the Chinese People's Political Consultative Conference (CPPCC), he was re-elected in November 2010, and his third term began in 2012.

On April 19, 2016, the Central Commission for Discipline Inspection said in a statement on its website that "Kong Lingzhong severely violated political codes of conduct and resisted organizational investigation". Then he was placed on one-year probation within the CCP (留党察看一年) and was downgraded to department director level of non leadership positions (正厅级非领导职务).
