= Laohekou =

Laohekou 老河口市 Laohokow
- County-level city
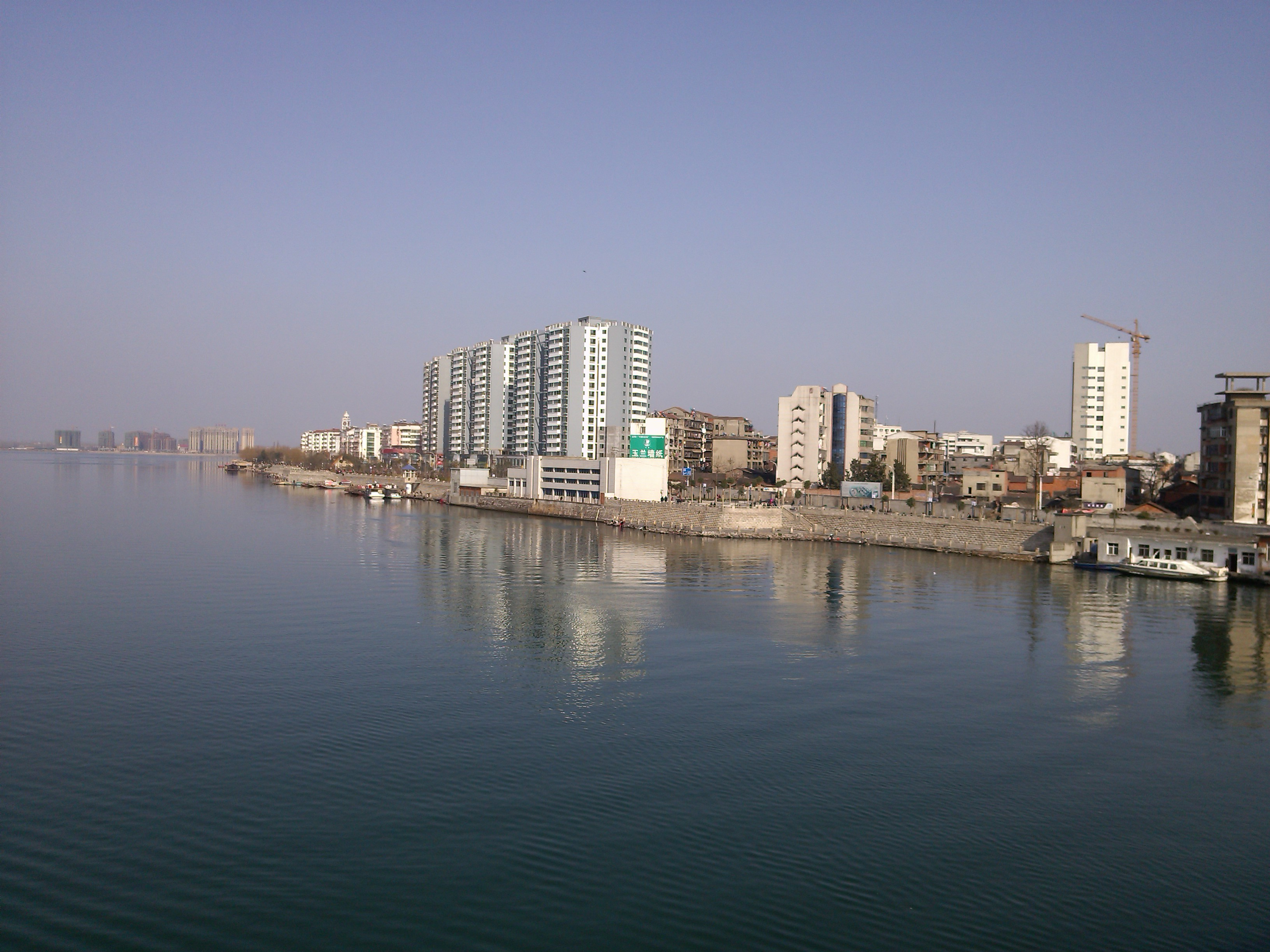
- The Han River in Laohekou

- Location in Hubei
- Coordinates (Laohekou government): 32°21′32″N 111°41′02″E
- Country: People's Republic of China
- Province: Hubei
- Prefecture-level city: Xiangyang

Area
  - County-level city: 1,032 km^{2} (398 sq mi)
  - Urban: 208.00 km^{2} (80.31 sq mi)

Population (2020)
  - County-level city: 420,495
  - Density: 407.5/km^{2} (1,055/sq mi)
  - Urban: 241,431
- Time zone: UTC+8 (China Standard)
- Website: www.laohekou.com.cn

Laohekou (Chinese: 老河口; pinyin: Lǎohékǒu; lit. 'old river mouth') is a county-level city in the northwest of Hubei province, People's Republic of China. It is located on the Han River (Hanshui), near the Henan border.

The entire county-level city has an area of 1,032 square kilometres (398 sq mi) and a population of 490,000 (2002). It falls under the jurisdiction of Xiangyang City. The area includes the city of Laohekou proper, which has an area of 27 square kilometres (10 sq mi).

Before the Communist Revolution, the city was the seat of the Roman Catholic Bishop of Laohekou.

== Geography and climate ==
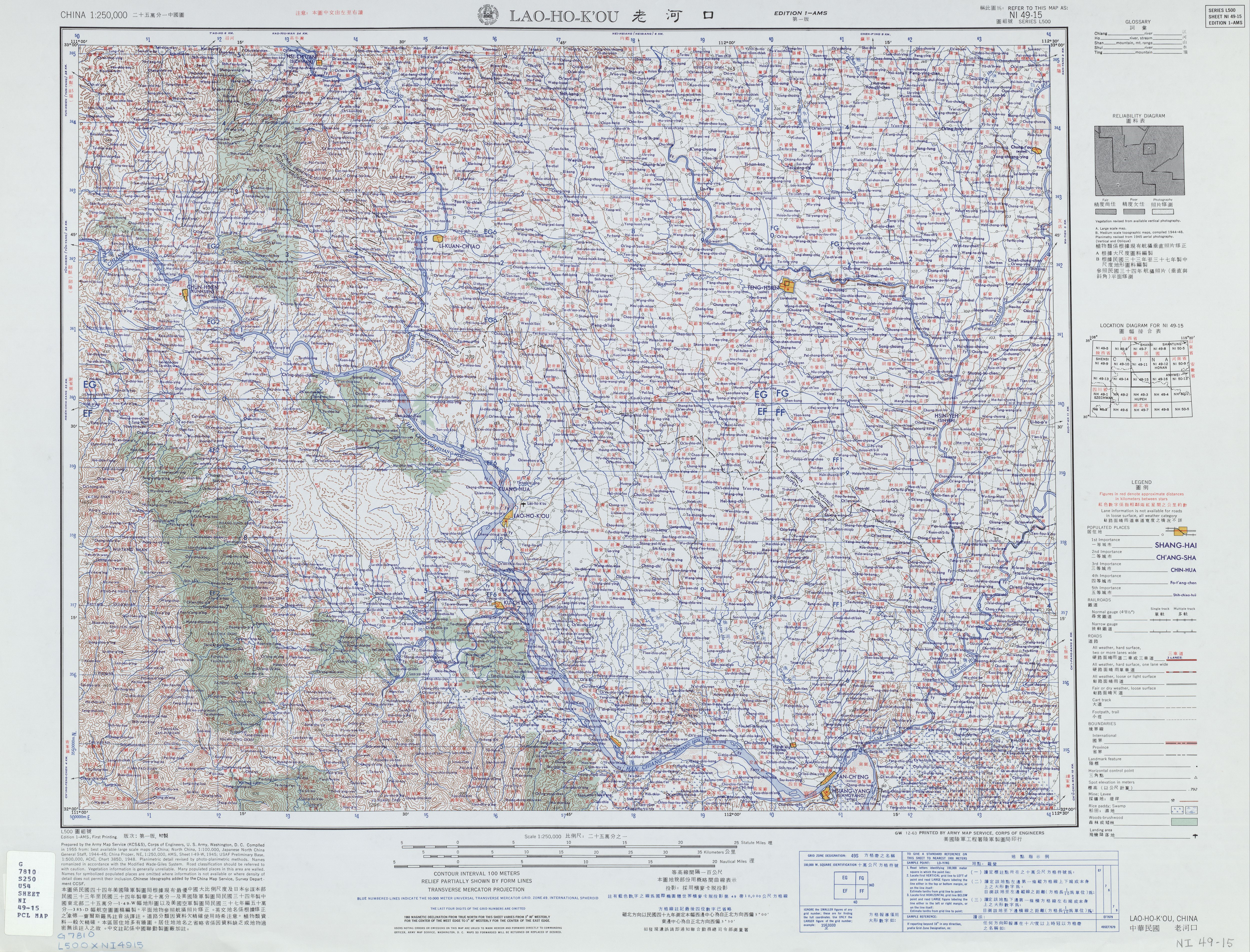
Map of Laohekou (labeled as LAO-HO-K'OU 老河口) and nearby areas (1955)

Laohekou has a monsoon-influenced, four season humid subtropical climate (Köppen Cfa), with cold, damp (but comparatively dry), winters, and hot, humid summers. The monthly 24-hour average temperature ranges from 2.9 °C (37.2 °F) in January to 27.4 °C (81.3 °F) in July, while the annual mean is 15.87 °C (60.6 °F). A majority of the annual precipitation of 830 mm (33 in) occurs from June to September. With monthly percent possible sunshine ranging from 33% in January to 46% in August, the city receives 1,762 hours of bright sunshine annually; January thru March is the cloudiest period of the year.

Climate data for Laohekou, elevation 132 m (433 ft), (1991–2020 normals, extremes 1951–present)
Month	Jan	Feb	Mar	Apr	May	Jun	Jul	Aug	Sep	Oct	Nov	Dec	Year
Record high °C (°F)	21.7 (71.1)	28.2 (82.8)	30.6 (87.1)	36.7 (98.1)	39.5 (103.1)	40.7 (105.3)	41.0 (105.8)	41.1 (106.0)	38.8 (101.8)	37.6 (99.7)	29.4 (84.9)	22.8 (73.0)	41.1 (106.0)
Mean daily maximum °C (°F)	7.7 (45.9)	11.0 (51.8)	16.2 (61.2)	22.7 (72.9)	27.7 (81.9)	31.0 (87.8)	32.4 (90.3)	31.6 (88.9)	27.5 (81.5)	22.4 (72.3)	15.9 (60.6)	10.1 (50.2)	21.3 (70.4)
Daily mean °C (°F)	2.9 (37.2)	5.8 (42.4)	10.6 (51.1)	16.7 (62.1)	21.8 (71.2)	25.7 (78.3)	27.7 (81.9)	26.8 (80.2)	22.4 (72.3)	17.1 (62.8)	10.7 (51.3)	5.1 (41.2)	16.1 (61.0)
Mean daily minimum °C (°F)	−0.7 (30.7)	1.6 (34.9)	6.1 (43.0)	11.7 (53.1)	16.9 (62.4)	21.4 (70.5)	24.2 (75.6)	23.3 (73.9)	18.8 (65.8)	13.1 (55.6)	6.6 (43.9)	1.2 (34.2)	12.0 (53.6)
Record low °C (°F)	−17.2 (1.0)	−13.1 (8.4)	−9.6 (14.7)	0.1 (32.2)	6.3 (43.3)	13.7 (56.7)	17.4 (63.3)	15.3 (59.5)	8.1 (46.6)	−0.1 (31.8)	−5.2 (22.6)	−13.0 (8.6)	−17.2 (1.0)
Average precipitation mm (inches)	22.5 (0.89)	21.9 (0.86)	46.4 (1.83)	60.8 (2.39)	93.3 (3.67)	87.5 (3.44)	126.4 (4.98)	129.1 (5.08)	78.8 (3.10)	67.6 (2.66)	42.9 (1.69)	17.5 (0.69)	794.7 (31.28)
Average precipitation days (≥ 0.1 mm)	6.0	7.3	8.8	9.4	11.2	10.0	11.4	11.9	11.1	10.2	8.0	6.0	111.3
Average snowy days	4.3	3.6	1.3	0.1	0	0	0	0	0	0	0.8	2.4	12.5
Average relative humidity (%)	72	71	71	72	71	74	81	80	77	76	75	71	74
Mean monthly sunshine hours	96.3	100.6	132.3	158.0	168.4	158.4	161.4	163.5	129.7	127.6	115.0	105.9	1,617.1
Percentage possible sunshine	30	32	35	40	39	37	37	40	35	37	37	34	36
Source 1: China Meteorological Administrationextremes
Source 2: Weather China

== Administrative divisions ==
Two subdistricts:

- Guanghua Subdistrict (光化街道), Zanyang Subdistrict (酂阳街道)

Seven towns:

- Menglou (孟楼镇), Zhulinqiao (竹林桥镇), Xueji (薛集镇), Zhangji (张集镇), Xianrendu (仙人渡镇), Hongshanzui (洪山嘴镇), Lilou (李楼镇)

The only township is Yuanchong Township (袁冲乡)

Other areas:

- Shucai Seed Stock Station (蔬菜原种场), Baihuashan Forestry Area (百花山林场), Linmaoshan Forestry Area (林茂山林场), Erfangying Seed Stock Station (二房营原种场)

== Transport ==
Laohekou is served by the Hankou–Danjiangkou Railway and the Laohekou Airport.
