= Archdiocese of Lanzhou =

Roman Catholic archdiocese in China

Coordinates: 38°02′N 103°48′E

Archdiocese of Lanzhou Archidioecesis Lanceuvensis 天主教兰州总教区

Location
- Country: China
- Ecclesiastical province: Lanzhou

Statistics
- Area: 250,000 km^{2} (97,000 sq mi)
- Population: Total; Catholics: (as of 1950); 4,000,000; 17,465 (0.4%)

Information
- Denomination: Roman Catholic
- Rite: Latin Rite
- Cathedral: Cathedral of the Sacred Heart in Lanzhou

Current leadership
- Pope: Leo XIV
- Metropolitan Archbishop: Joseph Han Zhihai

The Roman Catholic Archdiocese of Lanzhou (Latin: Lanceuven(sis), simplified Chinese: 兰州 / 皋兰; traditional Chinese: 蘭州 /皋蘭; pinyin: Lánzhōu / Gāolán) is a Latin Metropolitan Archdiocese of the Catholic church with an Ecclesiastical province, yet depends on the missionary Roman Congregation for the Evangelization of Peoples.

Its archiepiscopal see is the Cathedral of the Sacred Heart located in the city of Lanzhou, Gansu province. No statistics available.

== Ecclesiastical province ==
The Metropolitan's Suffragan sees are :

- Roman Catholic Diocese of Pingliang (平涼)
- Roman Catholic Diocese of Qinzhou (秦州)

== History ==
- Established on 21 June 1878 as Apostolic Vicariate of Kan-su, on territory split off from the then Apostolic Vicariate of Central Shensi
- Renamed on 28 April 1905 as Apostolic Vicariate of Northern Kansu, having lost territory to establish the then Apostolic Vicariate of Southern Kansu (甘肅南境)
- March 8, 1922: Renamed as Apostolic Vicariate of Western Kansu, having (re)gained territory from its above daughter Apostolic Vicariate of Southern Kansu (甘肅南境)
- 3 December 1924: Renamed as Apostolic Vicariate of Lanchowfu
- Lost territories again : on 1930.02.14 to establish the Mission sui juris of Xinjiang (新疆) and on 1937.02.04 to establish the Apostolic Prefecture of Xining (西寧)
- Promoted on 11 April 1946 as Metropolitan Archdiocese of Lanzhou

== Episcopal ordinaries ==
(all Roman rite)

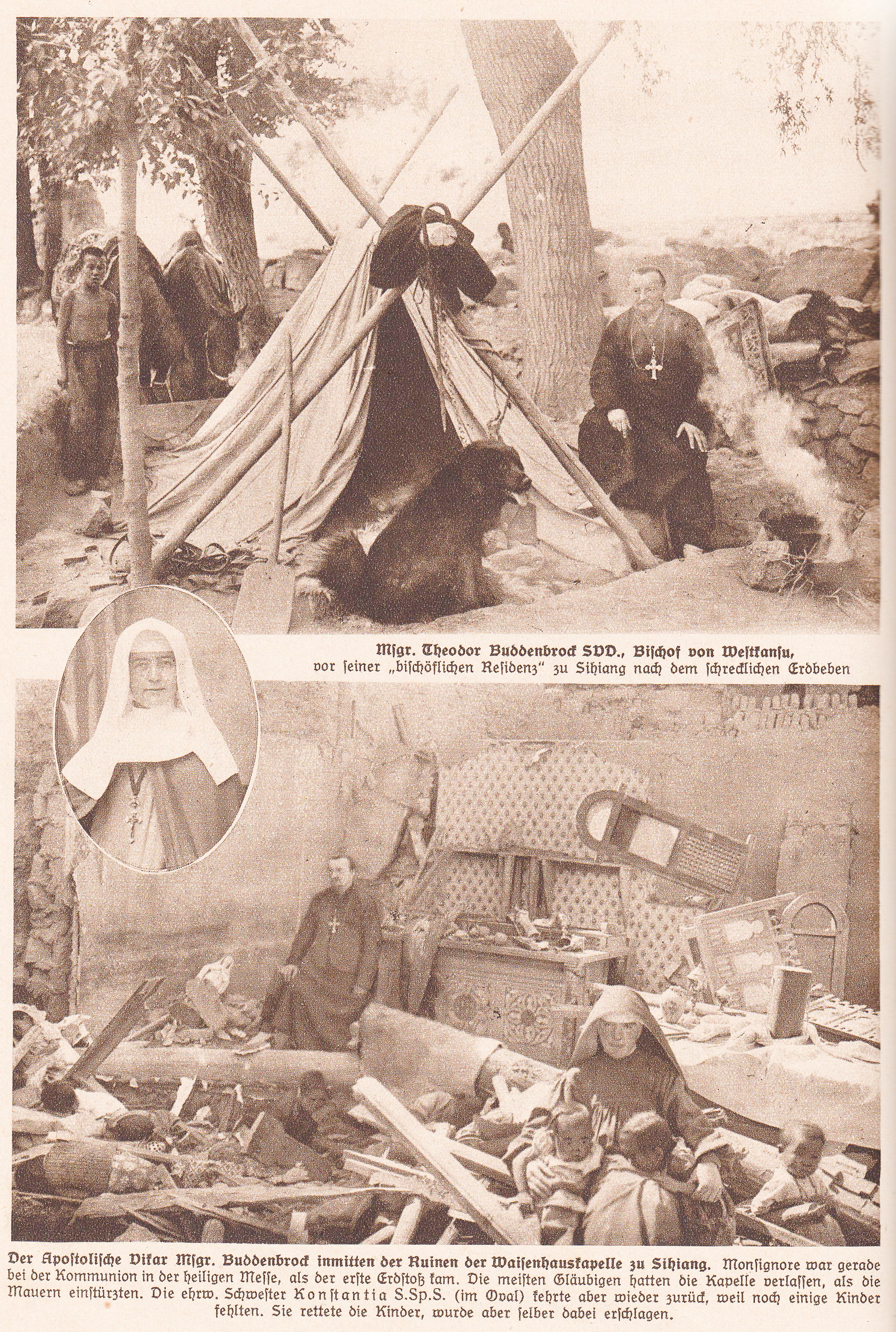
Monseigneur Theodor Buddenbrock conducts missionary work in China 1927

Apostolic Vicar of Kan-su

- Ferdinand Hubertus Hamer, Scheutists (C.I.C.M.) (born Netherlands) (1878.06.21–1888.08.30), Titular Bishop of Tremithus (1878.06.21–1900.07.15), next Apostolic Vicar of Southwestern Mongolia (西南蒙古) (China) (1888.08.30–death 1900.07.15)

Apostolic Vicars of Northern Kansu (甘肅北境)

- Hubertus Otto, C.I.C.M. (born Belgium) (June 20, 1890–retired 1918), Titular Bishop of Assuras (1890.06.20–death 1938.02.25)
- Godfried Frederix, C.I.C.M. (费达德) (born The Netherlands) (March 5, 1920–March 14, 1922), Titular Bishop of Thagaste (1920.03.08–1938.06.18), next Apostolic Vicar of Ningxia (寧夏) (China) (1922.03.14–retired 1930.03.21), died 1938

Apostolic Vicar of Western Kansu (甘肅西境)

- Theodor Buddenbrock, S.V.D. (born Germany) (November 25, 1924–3 December 1924 see below), Titular Bishop of Issus (1924.11.25–1946.04.11)

Apostolic Vicar of Lanchowfu (蘭州府)

- Theodor Buddenbrock, S.V.D. (see above 3 December 1924–April 11, 1946 see below)

Metropolitan Archbishops of Lanzhou (蘭州)

- Theodor Buddenbrock, S.V.D. (see above April 11, 1946–death January 18, 1959)
- Philip Yang Libo (first native incumbent) (1981–death 15 February 1998)–clandestine consecration 1981
- Joseph Han Zhihai (2003–present).

== See also ==
- List of Catholic dioceses in China

== Sources and external links ==
- GCatholic.org with Google satellite photo - data for all sections
- Catholic Hierarchy
