= Joseph Han Zhihai =

Chinese Catholic bishop (born 1966)

- Archbishop of the Roman Catholic Archdiocese of Lanzhou
- Church: Cathedral of the Sacred Heart in Lanzhou
- Archdiocese: Roman Catholic Archdiocese of Lanzhou
- Installed: 2003
- Predecessor: Philip Yang Libo

Orders
- Ordination: 1994

Personal details
- Born: 1966 (age 59–60) China
- Denomination: Roman Catholic

Joseph Han Zhihai (simplified Chinese: 韩志海; traditional Chinese: 韓志海; pinyin: Hán Zhìhǎi; born 1966) is a Chinese Catholic priest and Archbishop of the Roman Catholic Archdiocese of Lanzhou since 2003.

== Biography ==
Han was born in China in 1966. He was ordained a priest in 1994. He succeeded Archbishop Philip Yang Libo, who was the first Chinese to be Archbishop of the Roman Catholic Archdiocese of Lanzhou, from 1981 to 1998. He was a leader in the underground church and had been in prison for over 30 years. After his death, Han became administrator of the Roman Catholic Archdiocese of Lanzhou. Han was ordained Archbishop in 2003 by Xinjiang Underground Bishop Paul Xie Tingzhe. In late September 2018, Han was elected chairman of the Lanzhou Patriotic Catholic Association, a branch of the CCP-supported Catholic Patriotic Association.

Catholic Church titles
Previous: Philip Yang Libo	Archbishop of the Roman Catholic Archdiocese of Lanzhou; 2003	Incumbent
