= Diocese of Dali =

Roman Catholic diocese in China

Coordinates: 25.7000°N 100.1500°E

Diocese of Dali Dioecesis Talianus 天主教大理教区
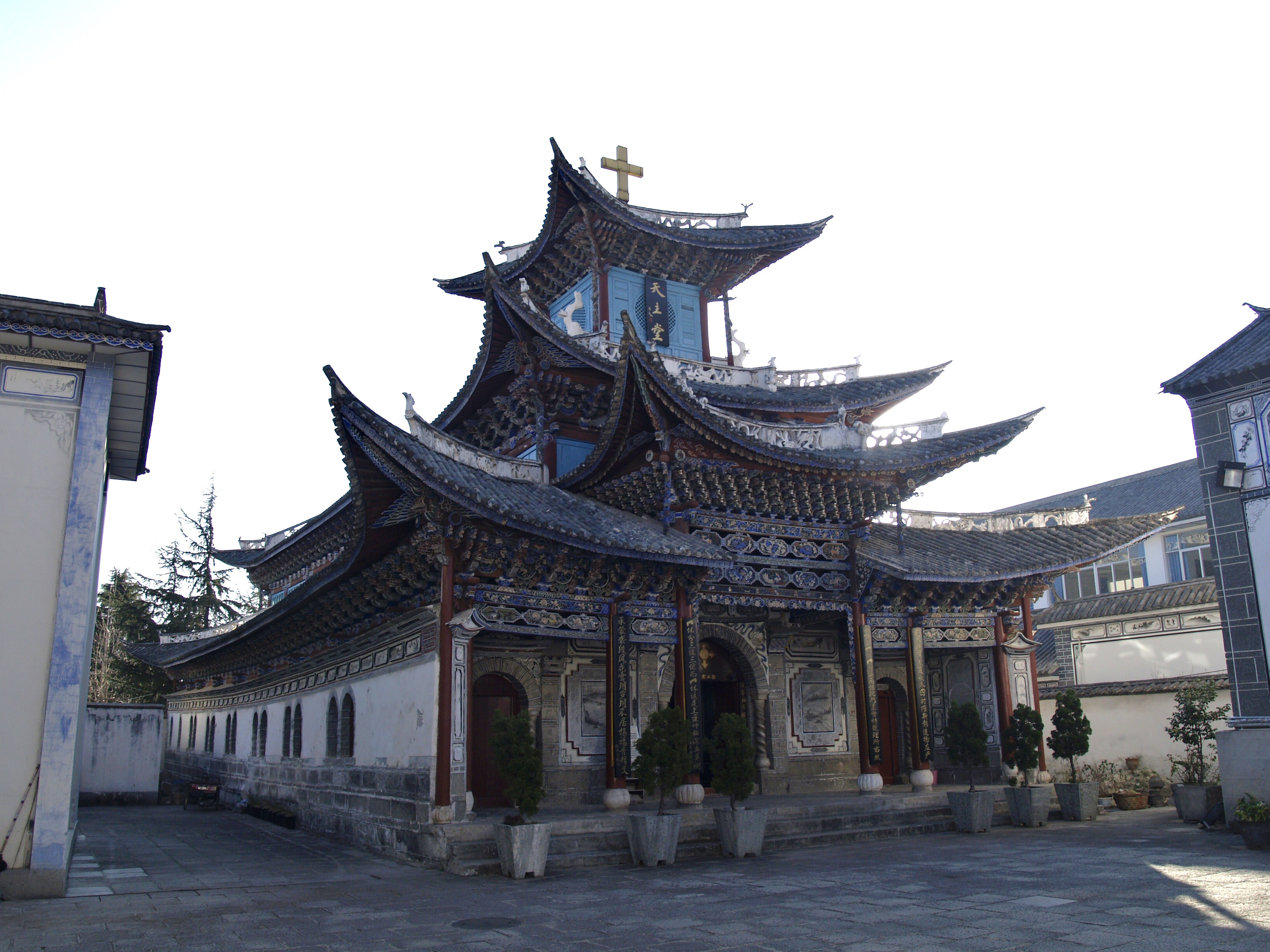
- Cathedral of the Sacred Heart

Location
- Country: China
- Ecclesiastical province: Kunming
- Metropolitan: Kunming

Statistics
- Population: Total; Catholics: (as of 1968); 3,212,339; 5,097 (0.2%)

Information
- Denomination: Catholic Church
- Sui iuris church: Latin Church
- Rite: Roman Rite
- Cathedral: Cathedral of the Sacred Heart in Dali, Yunnan

Current leadership
- Pope: Leo XIV
- Bishop: Sede Vacante
- Metropolitan Archbishop: Sede Vacante

Map
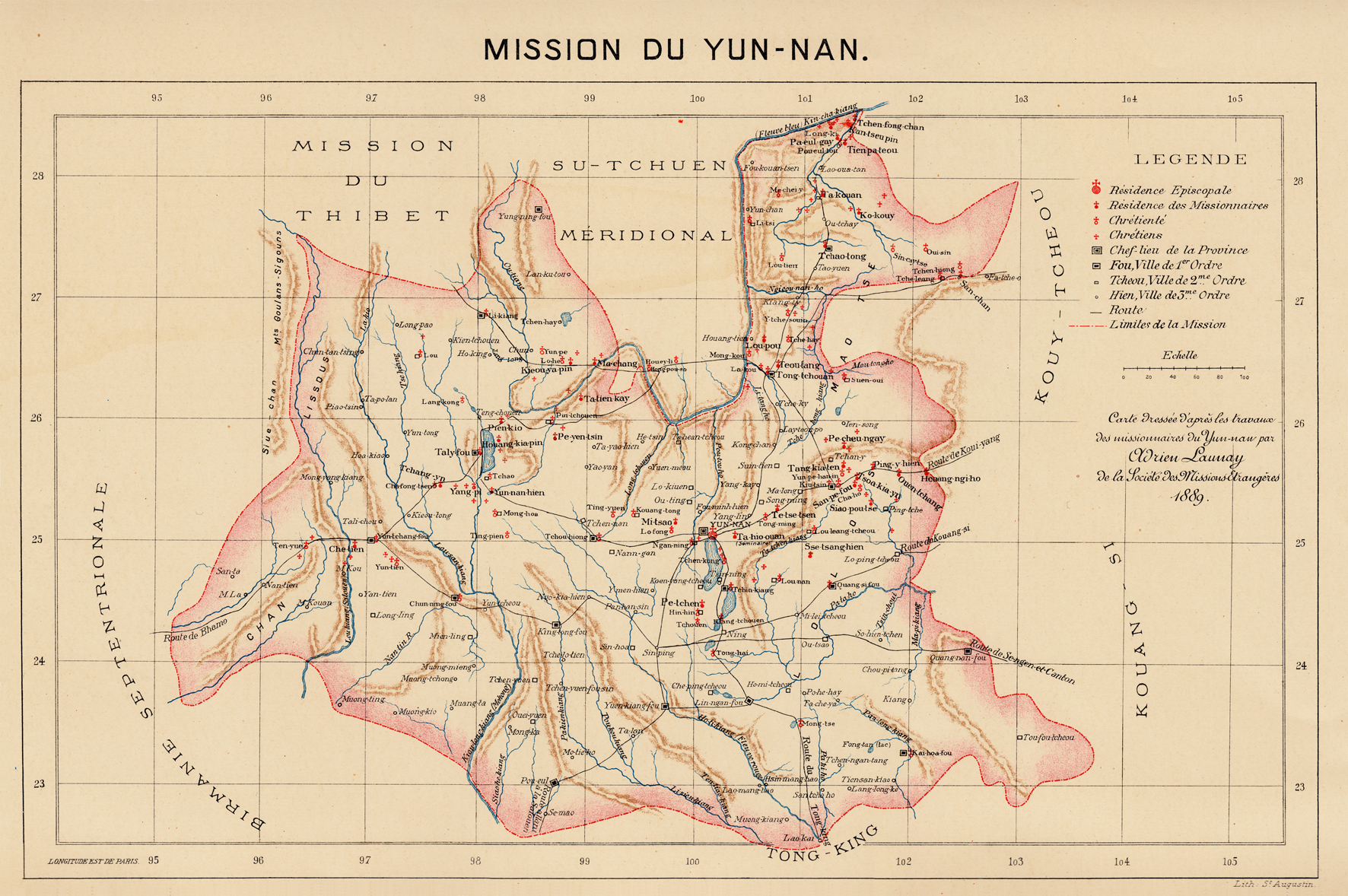
- Map of the Yunnan Mission, prepared by Adrien Launay, 1889.

The Diocese of Dali/Tali (Latin: Talian(us), Chinese: 大理) is a Latin Catholic diocese located in the city of Dali in the ecclesiastical province of Kunming in southwestern China.

In 2000, the Vatican appointed Lawrence Zhang Wen-Chang as Apostolic Administrator of Dali. He served until his death in 2012.

== History ==
- November 22, 1929: Established as Mission “sui iuris” of Dali/Taly-fou 大理 from the Apostolic Vicariate of Yunnanfu 雲南府
- December 13, 1931: Promoted as Apostolic Prefecture of Dali 大理
- 1938: The cathedral was built by French missionaries.
- December 9, 1948: Promoted as Diocese of Dali 大理
- 1984: The cathedral was rebuilt after suffering damage during the Cultural Revolution.

== Architecture ==
The Cathedral heavily incorporates elements of traditional Chinese architecture. It has a large crucifix on the exterior to identify itself as a church. The cathedral's exterior and interior design provides visual associations with Daoist and Buddhist buildings found throughout China.

== Leadership ==
- Bishops of Dali 大理 (Roman rite)
  - Bishop Lucien Bernard Lacoste (December 9, 1948 – 1983)
- Prefects Apostolic of Dali 大理 (Roman Rite)
  - Fr. Giovanni Battista Magenties (December 13, 1935 – 1947)
