= Bernardine Dong Guangqing =

Chinese bishop

Bernardine Dong Guangqing (April 1, 1917 – May 12, 2007) was a Catholic Patriotic Association-associated Bishop of Wuhan, China.

Dong was one of the first bishops in China to be consecrated without Vatican approval. According to Fr. Laurence "Larry" Murphy, who acted as a diplomatic go-between the Vatican and the People's Republic of China, Dong informed Murphy that prior to Dong's consecration, Dong had requested approval from the Vatican. Dong told Murphy that the Vatican had refused, stating in a telegram that only the pope could select bishops.

== See also ==
- Joseph Ma Yinglin
- Joseph Liu Xinhong
- Chinese Catholic Bishops' Conference
