= Joseph Ma Yinglin =

Chinese archbishop (born 1965)

Joseph Ma Yinglin (Chinese: 馬英林; born 1965) is the Chinese Patriotic Catholic Association-sponsored Bishop of the diocese of Kunming, China. He was consecrated a bishop on 30 April 2006, at age 41. The diocese had been vacant for 11 years.

The ordination of Bishop Ma went ahead without the approval of the Vatican. For some years, there had been an informal arrangement whereby new bishops for Chinese Catholic dioceses sought approval from the Pope prior to ordination. This was broken with the ordination of Ma, who had been the secretary of the Council of Catholic Bishops (a sort of episcopal conference not recognized by the Holy See) and had held various offices in the Chinese Patriotic Catholic Association, a division of the Religious Affairs Bureau of the Chinese government and the organism that controls the Church, and whose statutes include the goal of creating a national Church detached from the Holy See.

His ordination could, in the opinion of the highest ranking Chinese Catholic dignitary, Cardinal Joseph Zen Zi-kiun of Hong Kong, damage Church-State relations. In a warning issued the day prior to the ordination Cardinal Zen stated that "to conduct the ordination without the Holy See's approval is to sabotage intentionally Sino-Vatican relations."

On 4 May 2006, the Holy See's Press Office declared that Ma had been automatically excommunicated for being ordained without the pope's approval.

On September 22, 2018 Pope Francis lifted the excommunication of Joseph Ma Yinglin and other six bishops previously appointed by the Chinese government without a pontifical mandate.

== See also ==
- Zhan Silu
- Joseph Liu Xinhong
- Bernardine Dong Guangqing
