= Christianity in Fujian =

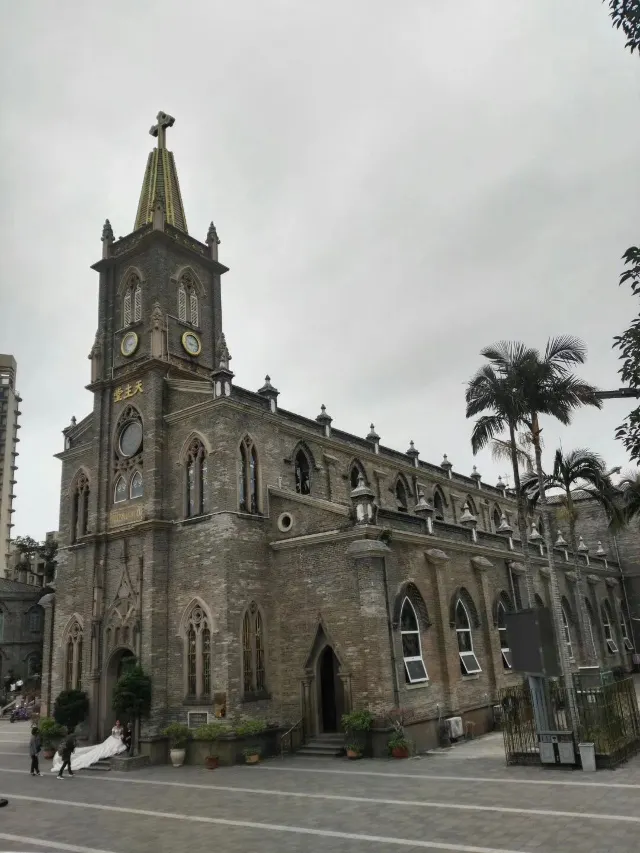
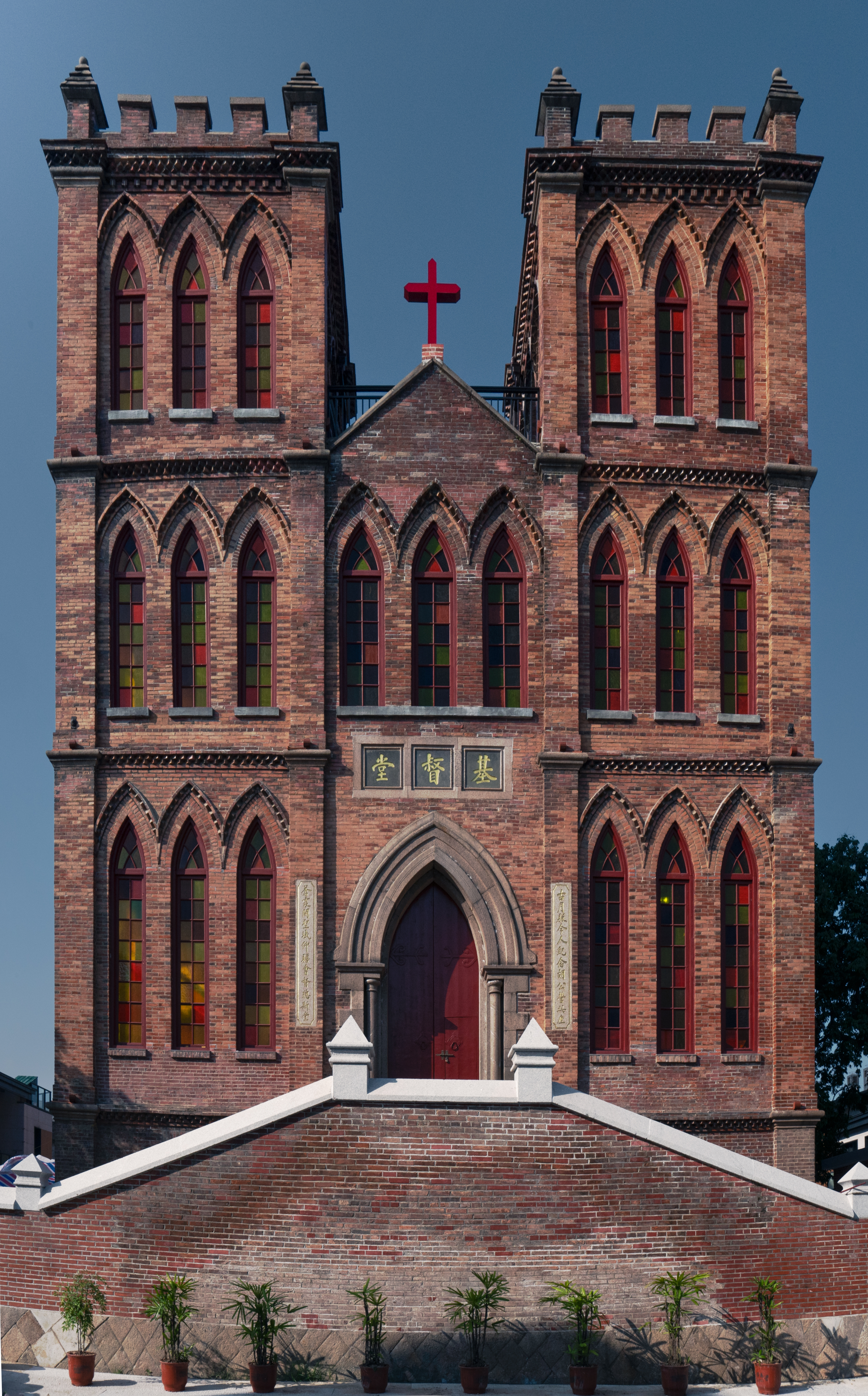
St. Dominic's Cathedral (left) is the cathedral of the Roman Catholic Archdiocese of Fuzhou. Christ Church (right) used to be the cathedral of the Diocese of Fukien of the Anglican Church in China.

Christianity is a minority in Fujian province of China. The Shouters are present in the province. Churches in Fujian include The Aowei Church of Holy Rosary, Church of Heavenly Peace, Fuzhou, Flower Lane Church, Saint Dominic's Cathedral, Fuzhou, Christ Church, Cangxia, and St. John's Church, Fuzhou. Christianity in Fuqing consisted of 350,000 Christians in the 2000s and is a centre of Christianity. The local churches (affiliation) are estimated to include about half of them. The number of members of the Three-Self Patriotic Movement in Fujian is a high 6-digit figure at least. There are at least 80,000 members of the True Jesus Church in the province. Fujian has many house churches. Christianity has been present in Fujian for centuries.

== Roman Catholic dioceses with seat in Fujian ==
- Roman Catholic Archdiocese of Fuzhou
- Roman Catholic Diocese of Tingzhou
- Roman Catholic Diocese of Xiamen

== See also ==
- Chinese Rites controversy, and Luo Wenzao, the first Catholic Bishop of Chinese ethnicity who was from Fujian
- Early western influence in Fujian
- Christianity in Fujian's neighbouring provinces
  - Christianity in Guangdong
  - Christianity in Jiangxi
  - Christianity in Zhejiang
- Category:Christian missionaries in Fujian
