= Christianity in Jiangxi =

Christianity is a minority in Jiangxi, the province of China where Taoism is from. There are numerous Christians in Fuzhou, which is the capital of Jiangxi. A Jiangxi Bible School exists. In the 17th century, Catholic missionary Jean Basset was active in Jiangxi and other parts of China. Jiangxi has persecution of Christians. Bishop Zheng Jingmu was arrested in 2000.

== Roman Catholic dioceses with seat in Jiangxi ==
- Roman Catholic Diocese of Ganzhou
- Roman Catholic Archdiocese of Nanchang
- Roman Catholic Diocese of Ji’an
- Roman Catholic Diocese of Nancheng
- Roman Catholic Diocese of Yujiang

== See also ==
- Spirit Church
- Christianity in Jiangxi's neighbouring provinces
  - Christianity in Anhui
  - Christianity in Fujian
  - Christianity in Guangdong
  - Christianity in Hunan
  - Christianity in Zhejiang
