= Church of Christ the King, Xiamen =

Roman Catholic cathedral in Xiamen, China

- Church of Christ the King
- 基督君王教堂
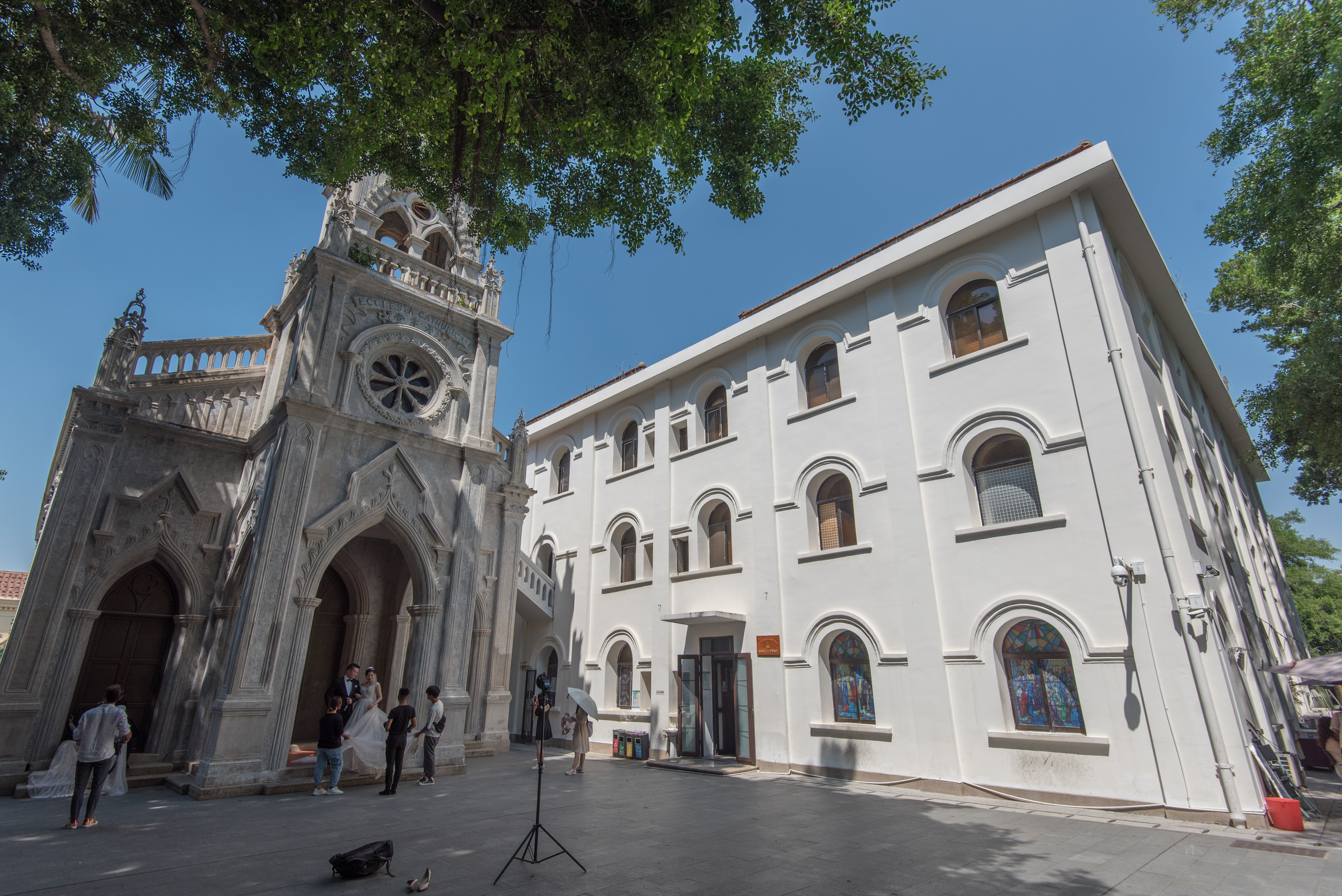
- Church of Christ the King, Xiamen
- 24.44647°N 118.06772°E
- Location: 34 Lujiao Road, Gulangyu Island, Xiamen, Fujian (FUJIAN) 361002. China
- Country: China
- Denomination: Roman Catholic

History
- Status: Former Cathedral
- Founded: 1917; 109 years ago
- Founder: Bishop Manuel Prat Pujoldevall
- Dedication: Jesus

Architecture
- Functional status: Active
- Heritage designation: World Heritage Site
- Designated: 8 July 2017

Administration
- Archdiocese: Roman Catholic Archdiocese of Fuzhou
- Diocese: Roman Catholic Diocese of Xiamen

Clergy
- Archbishop: Peter Lin Jiashan
- Bishop: Joseph Cai Bingrui

UNESCO World Heritage Site
- Part of: Kulangsu: a Historic International Settlement
- Criteria: Cultural: ii, iv
- Reference: 1541
- Inscription: 2017 (41st Session)

Church of Christ the King located in Xiamen, on Gulangyu Island, China, is a former cathedral and a World Heritage Site. It belongs to the Roman Catholic Diocese of Xiamen.

The Christ the King Church was founded and built by a Spanish Dominican Bishop named Manuel Prat Pujoldevall in the year 1917. The church, along with 51 notable sites on Gulangyu island, was included by the 41st session of the World Heritage Committee held in Krakow, Poland, on 8 July 2017, as a World Heritage Site. The church celebrated its 100 years of existence. It still serves as the cathedral for the Roman Catholic Diocese of Xiamen.
