= Diocese of Yuanling =

Latin Catholic territory in China

Diocese of Yuanling Dioecesis Iuen-limensis 天主教沅陵教区

Location
- Country: China
- Ecclesiastical province: Changsha

Information
- Denomination: Catholic Church
- Sui iuris church: Latin Church
- Rite: Roman Rite

Current leadership
- Pope: Leo XIV
- Bishop: sede vacante
- Metropolitan Archbishop: Methodius Qu Ailin
- Apostolic Administrator: Methodius Qu Ailin

The Diocese of Yuanling (Latin: Iuen-limen(sis), Chinese: 沅陵, 辰州) is a Latin Church ecclesiastical jurisdiction or diocese of the Catholic Church in the county of Yuanling (Hunan), China. It is a suffragan in the ecclesiastical province of the metropolitan Archdiocese of Changsha, yet depends on the missionary Roman Congregation for the Evangelization of Peoples.

It is episcopal seat is vacant since 1968, but has had an apostolic administrator since 2012.

== History ==
- Established on 13 March 1925 as the Apostolic Prefecture of Chenzhou 辰州 (中文) / Shenchow / de Shenchow (Latin), on territory split off from the then Apostolic Vicariate of Changde 常德 (now a diocese)
- Promoted on 28 May 1934 as Apostolic Vicariate of Chenzhou 辰州
- Renamed on 10 December 1934 as Apostolic Vicariate of Yuanling 沅陵
- Promoted on 11 April 1946 as Diocese of Yuanling 沅陵 (中文) / Chenzhou 辰州 (中文) / Shen-Chou / Yüanlíng / Iüen-limen(sis) (Latin)

== Ordinaries ==
Apostolic Prefects of Chenzhou 辰州 )

- Father Domenico Langenbacher, Passionists (C.P.) C.P. (born USA) (16 July 1925 – 1929)
- Fr. Cutbert Martin O'Gara, C.P. (born Canada) (12 February 1930 – 28 May 1934 see below)

Apostolic Vicar of Yuanling 沅陵

- Cutbert Martin O'Gara, C.P. (see above 28 May 1934 – 11 April 1946 see below), Titular Bishop of Elis (1934.05.28 – 1946.04.11)

Suffragan Bishops of Yuanling 沅陵

- Cutbert Martin O'Gara, C.P. (see above 11 April 1946 – death 13 May 1968)
- Apostolic Administrator Methodius Qu Ai-lin (屈藹林) (2012 – ...), while Metropolitan Archbishop of Changsha 長沙 (2012 - ...); also Apostolic Administrator of its three suffragan dioceses Changde, Yuanling and Hengzhou 衡州, Apostolic Administrator of Apostolic Prefecture of Lixian 澧縣, Apostolic Administrator of Apostolic Prefecture of Yongzhou 永州, Apostolic Administrator of Apostolic Prefecture of Yueyang 岳陽, Apostolic Administrator of Apostolic Prefecture of Xiangtan 湘潭, Apostolic Administrator of Apostolic Prefecture of Baoqing 寶慶 (all PR China, all 2012 - ...)

== Sources and external links ==
- GCatholic.org - data for all sections
- Catholic Hierarchy
