= Apostolic Prefecture of Yueyang =

Catholic missionary jurisdiction in China

The Apostolic Prefecture of Yueyang is Latin pre-diocesan jurisdiction of the Catholic Church with seat in Yueyang, Hunan province, central China.

It is exempt, i.e. directly dependent on the Holy See (not part of any ecclesiastical province), and on its missionary Roman Congregation for the Evangelization of Peoples.

No statistics available. It borders on its mother diocese Changde and Roman Catholic Diocese of Puqi 蒲圻, on the archdioceses of Nanchang 南昌 and Changsha 長沙 and on the Apostolic Prefecture of Lixian 澧縣.

It is vacant, under an Apostolic administrator since 2012.

== History ==
Established on 7 May 1931 as Apostolic Prefecture of Yueyang 岳陽 (中文) / Yuezhou 岳州 (中文) / Yochow / Yochoven(sis) (Latin adjective), on territory split off from the then Apostolic Vicariate of Changde (常德, now a diocese).

== Episcopal ordinaries ==
(all Roman Rite)

Apostolic Prefects of Lixian 澧縣

- Father Angelo de la Calle Fontecha, Augustinians (O.S.A.) (born Spain) (1932.01.16 – death 1964)
- James Li Shu-ren (李樹仁), O.S.A. (1958–?), without papal mandate; died 1997
- Apostolic Administrator Methodius Qu Ai-lin (屈藹林) (2012– ...), while Metropolitan Archbishop of Changsha 長沙 (China) (2012– ...); also Apostolic Administrator of its three suffragan dioceses Yuanling 沅陵, Roman Catholic Diocese of Hengzhou 衡州 and Roman Catholic Diocese of Changde 常德, Apostolic Administrator of Apostolic Prefecture of Yongzhou 永州, Apostolic Administrator of Apostolic Prefecture of Lixang 澧縣, Apostolic Administrator of Apostolic Prefecture of Xiangtan 湘潭, Apostolic Administrator of Apostolic Prefecture of Baoqing 寶慶 (all China, all 2012 – ...).

== See also ==
- List of Catholic dioceses in China

== Sources and external links ==
- GCatholic with Google map - data for all sections
