= Christianity in Hunan =

Christianity is a minority in Hunan province of the People's Republic of China. The Roman Catholic Archdiocese of Changsha, the Roman Catholic Diocese of Changde and the Roman Catholic Diocese of Hengzhou have their seat in the province. The province has persecution of Christians. Hunan has more than 1000 congregations. The Hunan Bible Institute was founded in 1909. True Jesus Church and The Shouters are present in the province. China Evangelistic Fellowship and China Fountain Group had a large following in 2000.

== See also ==
- Spirit Church
- Beili Wang
- Christianity in Hunan's neighbouring provinces
  - Christianity in Guangdong
  - Christianity in Guizhou
  - Christianity in Jiangxi
