= Apostolic Prefecture of Lixian =

Catholic missionary jurisdiction in China

The Apostolic Prefecture of Lixian is Latin rite pre-diocesan jurisdiction of the Catholic Church with seat in Lixian (Li County, Hunan), central China.

It is exempt, i.e. directly dependent on the Holy See (not part of any ecclesiastical province), and on its missionary Roman Congregation for the Evangelization of Peoples.

No statistics available. It borders on its mother diocese Changde and those of Yuanling 沅陵 and Yichang 宜昌 as well as on the Apostolic Prefecture of Shashi 沙市 and Apostolic Prefecture of Yueyang 岳陽.

It is vacant, under an Apostolic administrator since 2012.

== History ==
Established on 6 May 1931 as Apostolic Prefecture of Lixian 澧縣 (中文) / Lizhou 澧州 (中文) / Lichow / Lichoven(sis) (Latin), on territory split off from the then Apostolic Vicariate of Changde (常德, now a diocese).

== Episcopal ordinaries ==
(all Roman Rite)

Apostolic Prefects of Lixian 澧縣

- Father Ippolito Martínez y Martínez, Augustinians (O.S.A.) (born Spain) (1932.01.16 – death 1963)
- Li Zhen-lin (李震林) (1958 – death 1970?), without papal mandate
- Anthony Wang Zi-cheng (王子澄) (1987 – death 1995.05.24), without papal mandate
- Apostolic Administrator Methodius Qu Ai-lin (屈藹林) (2012– ...), while Metropolitan Archbishop of Changsha 長沙 (China) (2012– ...); also Apostolic Administrator of its three suffragan dioceses Yuanling 沅陵, Roman Catholic Diocese of Hengzhou 衡州 and Roman Catholic Diocese of Changde 常德, Apostolic Administrator of Apostolic Prefecture of Yongzhou 永州, Apostolic Administrator of Apostolic Prefecture of Yueyang 岳陽, Apostolic Administrator of Apostolic Prefecture of Xiangtan 湘潭, Apostolic Administrator of Apostolic Prefecture of Baoqing 寶慶 (all China, all 2012 – ...).

== See also ==
- List of Catholic dioceses in China

== Sources and external links ==
- GCatholic with Google map
