= Yueyang (disambiguation) =

Yueyang, formerly romanized as Yüeh-yang, may refer to the following places and jurisdictions :

- Yueyang City (岳陽市, 岳阳市, Yueyangshi), also formerly known as Yochow, a city in Hunan
- Yueyang County (岳陽縣, 岳阳县, Yueyangxian), in Hunan, named after its above capital
- the Catholic Apostolic Prefecture of Yueyang
- Yueyang (Qin) (櫟陽), a capital of the state of Qin during the Warring States period
- Yueyang (岳阳镇), a town in Sichuan
