= John Peng Weizhao =

Chinese Roman Catholic Bishop

- Bishop of the Roman Catholic Diocese of Yujiang
- Church: Cathedral of St Louis in Yujiang
- Province: Nanchang
- Diocese: Roman Catholic Diocese of Yujiang
- Installed: 2014
- Predecessor: Thomas Zeng Jing-mu

Personal details
- Born: 1966 (age 59–60) China
- Denomination: Roman Catholic

Chinese name
- Traditional Chinese: 彭衛照
- Simplified Chinese: 彭卫照
Transcriptions
Standard Mandarin
- Hanyu Pinyin: Péng Wèizhào

John Peng Weizhao (Chinese: 彭卫照; born 1966) is a Chinese Roman Catholic Bishop of the Roman Catholic Diocese of Yujiang.

== Biography ==
Peng was born in China in 1966. He attended National Seminary in Beijing and was ordained a priest in 1989.

After the death of his predecessor Thomas Zeng Jing-mu, he was "clandestinely" appointed bishop of the Roman Catholic Diocese of Yujiang by the Holy See. He accepted the episcopacy with the papal mandate on 10 April 2014. From May to November 2014, he was under house arrest by the local government.

== Jiangxi Installation ==
On 24 November 2022, civil authorities held an "installation ceremony" in Nanchang on 24 making Peng the auxiliary bishop of a diocese unrecognized by the Holy See, the Diocese of Jiangxi. Some 200 people attended the ceremony presided over by Bishop John Baptist Li Suguang of Nanchang, who is also vice president of the Chinese Catholic Bishops’ Conference. The Holy See does not recognize him as a bishop, nor his diocese, nor that conference.

During the installation ceremony, Bishop Peng made a public vow of service to the church and obedience to government policy: "I shall follow the commandments of God, do my best to carry out the duties of an auxiliary bishop, faithfully proclaim the gospel, lead the clergy and laity of Jiangxi diocese, follow the national constitution, protect national unity and social harmony, love the country and love the religion, uphold the principle of independent self-management of the church, uphold our country's direction to sinicize religion, positively lead the Catholic church to conform to socialist society, and to make contribution to the realization of the Chinese people's great dream of rejuvenation."

On 26 November the Holy See protested that this action violated the 22 September 2018 agreement between the government and the Holy See on the appointment of bishops. It noted that Peng had been subjected to "long and heavy pressure from the local authorities". That provisional agreement has not been made public, but it is understood that Pope Francis agreed to lift the excommunication on seven bishops ordained without the Rome's permission and would thereafter have final say over the appointment of additional bishops he would choose from candidate list proposed by Chinese authorities. The agreement has been renewed twice, as recently as October 2022.

Catholic Church titles
Previous: Thomas Zeng Jing-mu	Bishop of the Roman Catholic Diocese of Yujiang; 2014	Incumbent
