= Diocese of Changde =

Roman Catholic diocese in China

Diocese of Changde Dioecesis Ciamteanus 天主教常德教区
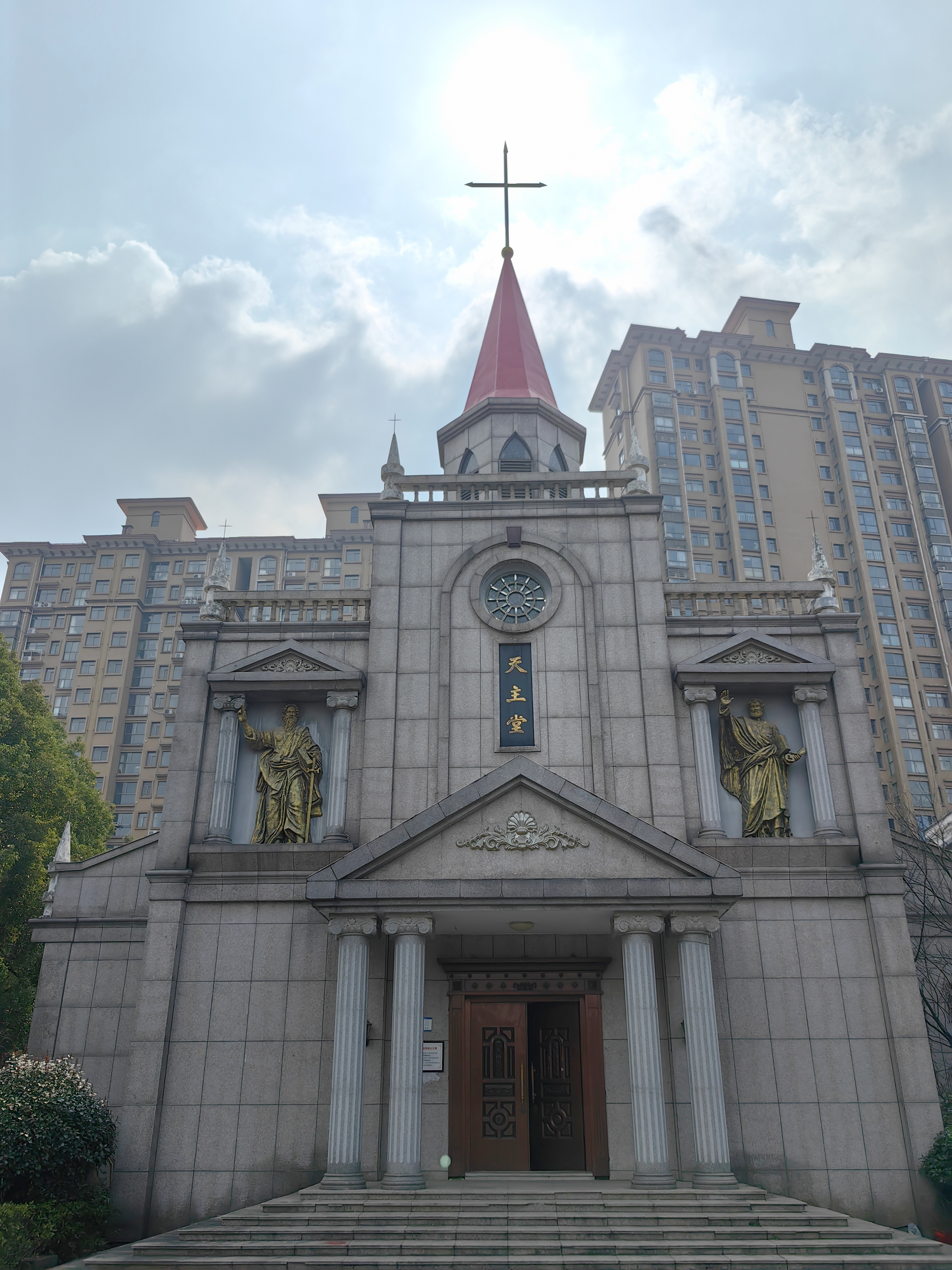
- Changde Cathedral

Location
- Country: China
- Ecclesiastical province: Changsha
- Metropolitan: Changsha

Statistics
- Area: 10,000 km^{2} (3,900 sq mi)
- Population: Total; Catholics: (as of 1950); 3,200,000; 6,690 (0.2%)

Information
- Rite: Latin Rite

Current leadership
- Pope: Leo XIV
- Bishop: Sede Vacante
- Metropolitan Archbishop: Methodius Qu Ailin
- Apostolic Administrator: Methodius Qu Ailin

The Roman Catholic Diocese of Changde (Latin: Ciamtean(us), Chinese: 常德) is a suffragan Latin diocese in the ecclesiastical province of Changsha, in Central China, yet depends on the missionary Roman Congregation for the Evangelization of Peoples.

Its episcopal see is the city of Changde.

It is vacant since 1965, but has an Apostolic administrator since 2012.

== History ==
- Established on 19 September 1879 as Apostolic Vicariate of Northern Hunan 湖南北境, on territory split off from the then Apostolic Vicariate of Hunan 湖南
- Renamed on 3 December 1924, after its see, as Apostolic Vicariate of Changde 常德 / Changteh / de Changteh (Latin)
- Lost territory repeatedly : on 1925.03.13 to establish the Apostolic Prefecture of Chenzhou 辰州, on 1931.05.06 to establish the Apostolic Prefecture of Lixian 澧縣 and on 1931.05.07 to establish the Apostolic Prefecture of Yueyang 岳陽
- Promoted on 11 April 1946 as Diocese of Changde 常德 / Changteh / Ciamtean(us) (Latin)

== Episcopal ordinaries ==
(all Roman rite)

Apostolic Vicars of Northern Hunan 湖南北境

- Pro-Apostolic Vicar Father Elías Suárez, Augustinians (O.E.S.A.) (born Spain) (1879.09.19 – retired 1884.07.25), died 1885
- Pro-Vicar Apostolic Saturnino de La Torre Merino, Augustinians (O.E.S.A.) (born Spain) (1884.07.25 – 1896), died 1916
- Luis Pérez y Pérez (born Spain) (10 March 1896 – death 15 April 1910), Titular Bishop of Corycus (1896.03.10 – 1910.04.15)
- Father Agustín González, O.E.S.A. (born Spain) (1910.05.18 – 1911.06.20 not possessed), Titular Bishop of Adraha (1910.05.18 – 1911.06.20 not possessed)
- Juvencio Hospital de la Puebla, O.S.A. (born Spain) (18 September 1911 – retired March 1917), Titular Bishop of Caunas (1911.09.18 – death 1957.10.04)
- Angel Diego y Carbajal, O.S.A. (born Spain) (22 March 1917 – 3 December 1924 see below), Titular Bishop of Calœ (1917.03.22 – death 1940.06.28)

Apostolic Vicars of Changde 常德

- Angel Diego y Carbajal, O.S.A. (see above December 2, 1924 – retired November 16, 1938)
- Gerardo Faustino Herrero Garrote, O.S.A. (11 December 1939 – 11 April 1946 see below), Titular Bishop of Zorolus (1939.12.11 – 1946.04.11)

Suffragan Bishops of Changde 常德

- Gerardo Faustino Herrero Garrote, O.S.A. (see above 11 April 1946 – death 23 April 1965)
- Michael Yan Gao-jian (楊高堅), O.S.A. (1958 – ?), without papal mandate
- Apostolic Administrator Methodius Qu Ai-lin (屈藹林) (2012 – ...), while Metropolitan Archbishop of Changsha 長沙 (China) (2012 - ...); also Apostolic Administrator of its three suffragan dioceses Yuanling 沅陵 and Hengzhou 衡州, Apostolic Administrator of Apostolic Prefecture of Lixian 澧縣 (China), Apostolic Administrator of Apostolic Prefecture of Yongzhou 永州, Apostolic Administrator of Apostolic Prefecture of Yueyang 岳陽, Apostolic Administrator of Apostolic Prefecture of Xiangtan 湘潭, Apostolic Administrator of Apostolic Prefecture of Baoqing 寶慶 (all China, all 2012 - ...)..

== Sources and external links ==
- GCatholic.org, with Google map - data for all sections
- Catholic Hierarchy
