= Joseph Cai Bingrui =

Chinese bishop (born 1966)

Most Reverend Joseph Cai Bingrui
- Metropolitan Archbishop of Fuzhou
- Archdiocese: Fuzhou
- Province: Fujian
- Metropolis: Fuzhou
- Installed: 2025
- Predecessor: Peter Lin Jiashan
- Other post: Bishop of Xiamen (2010-2025)

Orders
- Ordination: 1992
- Consecration: May 8, 2010

Personal details
- Born: September 15, 1966 (age 60) Zhangzhou, China
- Denomination: Roman Catholic
- Coat of arms

Joseph Cai Bingrui (Chinese: 蔡炳瑞; pinyin: Cài Bǐngruì; born 15 September 1966) is a Chinese Catholic Archbishop of the Archdiocese of Fuzhou, was the bishop of Roman Catholic Diocese of Xiamen from 2010 to 2025.

== Biography ==
Cai was born into a Catholic family. In 1985 he entered the Sheshan Basilica. He was ordained a priest in 1992.

Cai was the administrator of the Roman Catholic Diocese of Xiamen in 1996. He was elected unanimously to be bishop candidate in June 2009. He became the bishop on the May 8, 2010. He was recognized by the Vatican, under the auspices of Bishop Zhan, whose diocese is also in Fujian province.

Cai was elevated to Fuzhou as Metropolitan Archbishop in January 2025.

Catholic Church titles
Preceded by Peter Lin Jiashan	Metropolitan Archbishop of Roman Catholic Archdiocese of Fuzhou; 2025–present	Incumbent
Previous: Joseph Huang Ziyu	Bishop of the Roman Catholic Diocese of Xiamen; 2010-2025	Succeeded by Sede Vacante
