= John Wu =

John Wu may refer to:

- John Wu Shi-zhen (1921–2014), Chinese Roman Catholic archbishop
- John Baptist Wu (1925–2002), bishop of Hong Kong's Catholic church
- John Ching Hsiung Wu (1899–1986), jurist and author
- John Wu (politician) (born 1969), Taiwanese politician

== See also ==
- John Woo (disambiguation)
