= Cathedral of the Immaculate Conception (Changsha) =

- 长沙圣母无染原罪主教座堂
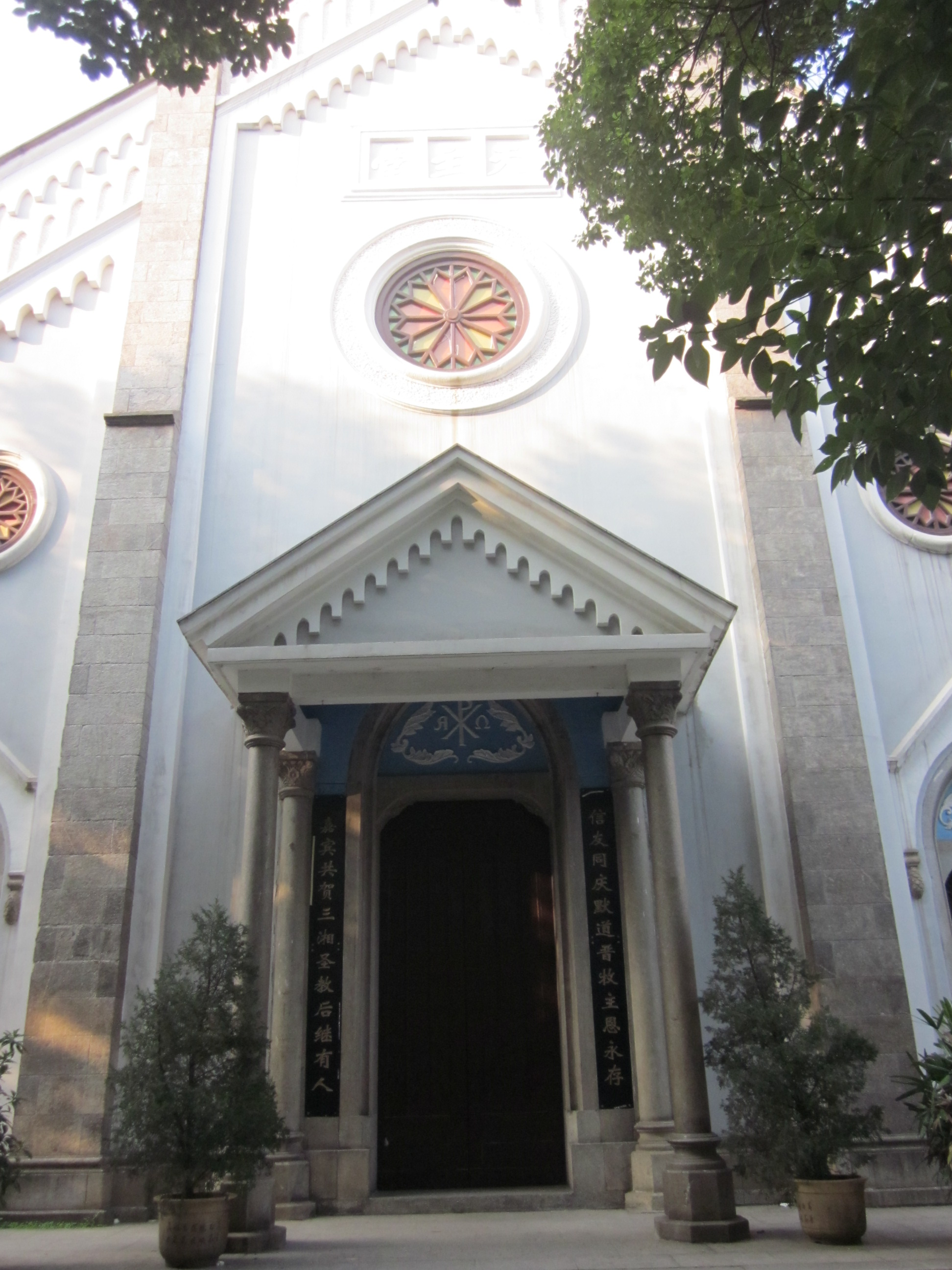
- Cathedral of the Immaculate Conception

- Location in Hunan Cathedral of the Immaculate Conception (China)
- 28°12′39″N 112°58′45″E
- Location: Xiangchun Street, Huangxing North Road, Changsha, Hunan
- Country: China
- Denomination: Roman Catholic

History
- Status: Parish church
- Founded: 1902

Architecture
- Functional status: Active
- Architect: Weng Mingde
- Architectural type: Church building
- Style: Gothic Revival architecture
- Years built: 1902

Administration
- Archdiocese: Changsha
- Diocese: Changsha

Clergy
- Bishop: Qu Ailin

Cathedral of the Immaculate Conception
- Traditional Chinese: 長沙聖母無染原罪主教座堂
- Simplified Chinese: 长沙圣母无染原罪主教座堂
Transcriptions
Standard Mandarin
- Hanyu Pinyin: Chángshā Shèngmǔ Wúrǎn Yuánzuì Zhǔjiàozuòtáng

Cathedral of the Immaculate Conception
- Traditional Chinese: 長沙天主堂
- Simplified Chinese: 长沙天主堂
Transcriptions
Standard Mandarin
- Hanyu Pinyin: Chángshā Tiānzhǔtáng

The Cathedral of the Immaculate Conception is a 20th-century English Gothic revival church that serves as the cathedral of the Roman Catholic Archdiocese of Changsha. It is located in the Xiangchun Street, Kaifu District of Changsha, Hunan, China.

== History ==
It was built in 1902, in the late Qing Dynasty, by Weng Mingde (Chinese: 翁明德), who was an Italian Franciscan missionary, and was destroyed by chaos in 1910. Then it was rebuilt in 1911.

In 2002, it was listed as a "Historical and Cultural Sites Protected at the Provincial Level" by the Hunan government.

In December 2008, the church celebrated its first one hundred years.

== Bishop ==
- Qu Ailin (simplified Chinese: 屈蔼林; traditional Chinese: 屈藹林), born in May 1961, in Hengyang of Hunan province.

== See also ==
- List of cathedrals in China
