= John Woo (disambiguation) =

John Woo (born 1946) is a Hong Kong film director and producer.

John Woo is also the name of:

- John Woo (musician), with the rock band The Magnetic Fields
- Johnny Woo (comics), a Judge Dredd comic character

== See also ==
- John Wu (disambiguation)
