= Christianity in Guangdong =

Christianity is a minority in Guangdong, a province of China. The province has more Christians than it has Muslims. Christianity in Hong Kong enjoys more liberty.

== 16th century ==
In the 16th century, missionaries entered Zhaoqing in Guangdong. Roman Catholic missionary Matteo Ricci came to Guangdong Province in 1583. In September 1807 Robert Morrison landed in Guangzhou. Elijah C. Bridgman and his wife, the first American Protestant missionaries to China, arrived in Guangzhou in 1830. The Protestant population of Guangdong exceeds half a million.

Watchman Nee was from Guangdong. The province has numerous house churches. Guangzhou has Union Theological Seminary. Religious liberty is closer to be respected in Guangdong than in other areas. The house churches in Guangdong face the risk of being closed and its members punished. The province has more Protestants than it has Catholics. Lutherans were active in the province.

== Chaozhou ==
Christianity reached Chaozhou in the 19th century. There were more than 100 Baptist churches. Furthermore, there were Presbyterian churches.

== List of Roman Catholic dioceses with seat in Guangdong ==
- Roman Catholic Archdiocese of Guangzhou
- Roman Catholic Diocese of Jiangmen
- Roman Catholic Diocese of Jiaying
- Roman Catholic Diocese of Shantou
- Roman Catholic Diocese of Shaozhou

== See also ==
- Beili Wang
- Christianity in Guangdong's neighbouring provinces
  - Christianity in Fujian
  - Christianity in Hong Kong
  - Christianity in Hunan
  - Christianity in Jiangxi
  - Christianity in Macau
