= Thomas Zeng Jing-mu =

Chinese Roman Catholic bishop

Thomas Zeng Jing-mu OP
- Bishop of Yujiang
- Native name: 曾景牧
- Church: Catholic Church
- Diocese: Diocese of Yujiang
- In office: 17 January 1990 – April 2014
- Predecessor: William Charles Quinn
- Successor: John Peng Weizhao

Orders
- Ordination: 25 March 1949
- Consecration: 17 January 1990 by James Xie Shiguang

Personal details
- Born: 3 September 1920 Zengjia Village, Republic of China
- Died: 2 April 2016 (aged 95) Fuzhou, Jiangxi, China

Thomas Zeng Jing-mu (Chinese: 曾景牧; 3 September 1920 – 2 April 2016) was a Chinese Roman Catholic bishop.

Born in China, Zeng Jing-mu was ordained a priest on 23 March 1949. In 1988 he was appointed and on 13 January 1990, was clandestinely consecrated as bishop, and from 1988 to 2012 was a bishop ordinary of the Roman Catholic Diocese of Yujiang.
