= Early western influence in Fujian =

Cultural exchanges between western peoples, particularly Arabs and Chinese, have been occurring for centuries. The earliest records go back to 635, with the discovery of the Nestorian Stone, and are then followed by Marco Polo and Ibn Batutta several centuries later.

The Nestorian Stone located in Xi'an records is the earliest known name of a Christian missionary, Alopen, who traveled to China through the Silk Road to Chang'an, which was the then capital of the Tang dynasty in 635. He was sent by the Church of the East. When he arrived in Chang'an, he was welcomed by T'ai Tsung, who brought him to an imperial library and ordered the books that he brought with him to be translated into Hokkien. It is noted that most of the earliest Christian works can be dated back to the period of Alopen. In 638, three years after Alopen's arrival in China, the first Christian church was built in Chang'an, and with it, came the presence of 21 all-Persian Nestorian monks who were recognized to be in the Tang Empire.

== Marco Polo ==
The first tangible record of Westerners in Fuzhou is that of Marco Polo, in about 1285, when he visited Fujiu. He observed that the people were the subjects of Kublai Khan, were ‘idolaters’, and much engaged in commerce and manufacture. Marco Polo remarks that in these parts, Ginger and galangal are produced in quantities, as are other drugs.

The people in this part of the country are addicted to eating human flesh, esteeming it more delicate than any other, provided that the person has not been occasioned by disease... They are a most savage race of men, insomuch that when they slay their enemies in battle, they are anxious to drink their blood, and afterwards, they devour their flesh.

Marco Polo dictated his book in prison several years after he returned from China. Some suggest that he did not visit this part of China at all. He claims to have visited Quanzhou, which, according to Marco Polo, is fifteen miles from Guangzhou, after leaving Fuzhou and making a detour in Guilin and Guangzhou.

They inquired from what source they had received their faith and their rule, and their informants replied, "From our forefathers."

== Ibn Battuta ==
The Rihla documents the world travels of the Moroccan traveler Ibn Battuta, including his journey and travels in China. Ibn Batutta left for China from the Samudra Pasai Sultanate, located on the Malaysian island of Sumatra, in April 1346, in a junk provided for him by the ruler of Samudra Pasai, Al-Mailk al Zahir. In The Rihla, Ibn Battuta recalls that the trip to China took four months, possibly owing to stops at two ports in either eastern Malaysia, Champa, or Tonkin. The description and the locations of these places remain unknown and are thought to have not existed at all.

Some historians note that Ibn Battuta's travelogue of his visit to China appears superficial, though it did describe Battuta's concern with the dominance of paganism in China and his dislike of most of what he saw in China, with him tending to stay at his home "as often as he could". In the Rihla, it mentions that he first landed in the port city of Quanzhou and later met with a Chinese envoy who was the chief of customs in the city and who had met with Ibn Battuta in his previous travels and arrived in China before Battuta had, and who possibly allowed for Battuta to later visit the capital of the Yuan dynasty to meet the emperor as a diplomat of the Sultanate of India.

He received word that he was to go on to Beijing to meet with the emperor, and Ibn Battuta is thought to have taken the northward route through the canal system, and it is possible that he first stopped at a city he called Qanjanfu, which is now commonly called Fuzhou, and a second stop further up the canal at Hangzhou. He stayed in Hangzhou for a few weeks before returning to Quanzhou, where he would eventually leave from the southern coast in the fall monsoon season of 1346.

== See also ==
- Christianity in Fujian
- Opium Wars
- Unequal Treaties
