= St. John's Church, Fuzhou =

Church in Fuzhou, China

Coordinates: 26°02′46.27″N 119°18′25.53″E

St. John's Church
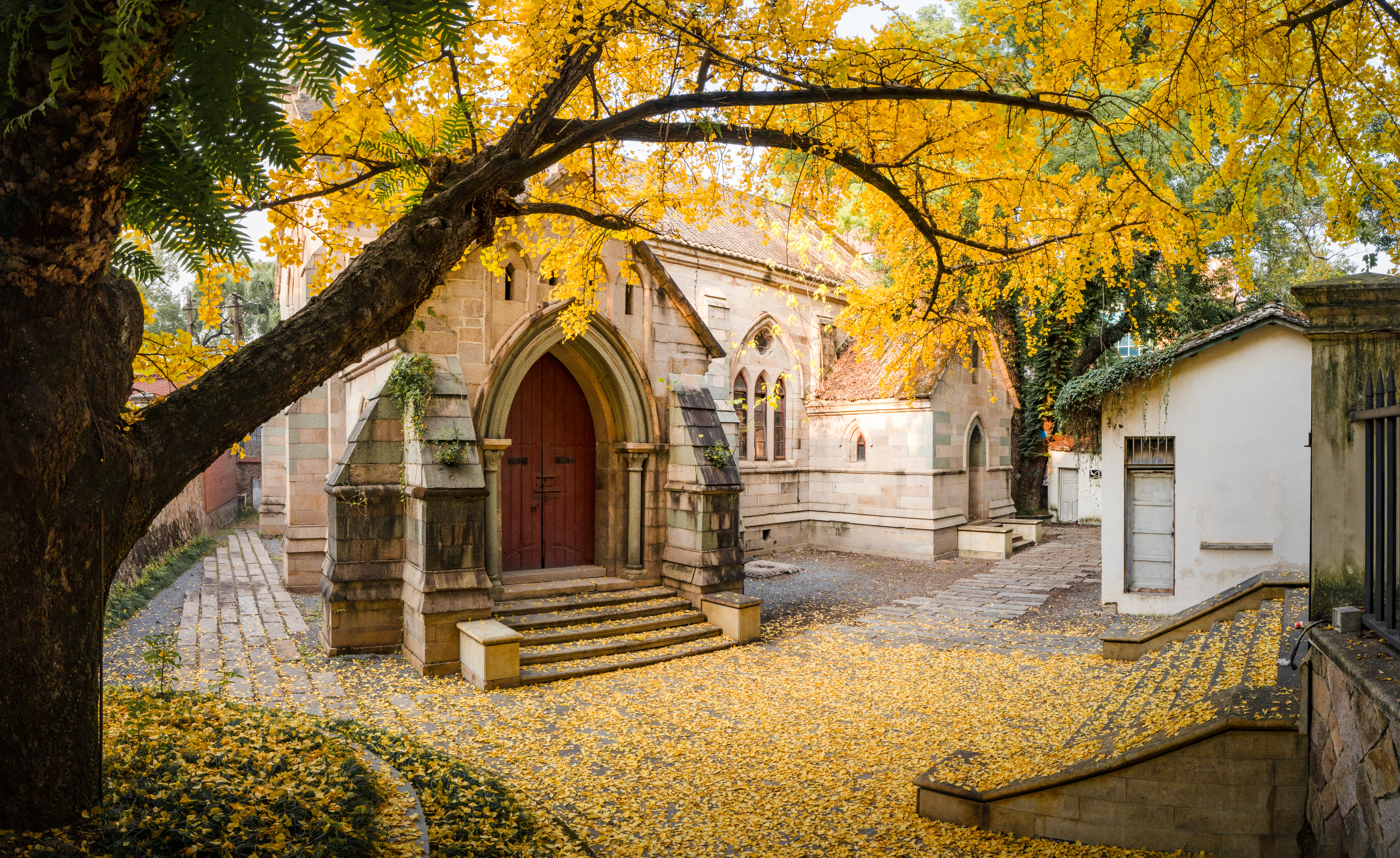
- St. John's Church
- Location: Fuzhou
- Country: China
- Denomination: Anglican

History
- Status: Church
- Dedicated: 1860

Architecture
- Functional status: Military occupation
- Architect: T. C. Walkers
- Style: Gothic

St. John's Church (Chinese: 圣约翰教堂; Foochow Romanized: Séng Iók-hâng Gáu-dòng) is an abandoned Anglican church located in Lequn Street No. 9, Cangshan District, Fuzhou, China. It is also known in the Foochow vernacular as "石厝教堂" (Siŏh-chuó Gáu-dòng, lit., Stone House Church). Completed in 1860, the church was donated by British people living in Fuzhou in 1858. The church is of a typical Gothic style. T. C. Walkers was the engineer who designed the building.

The site of the church was initially over 1000m^{2}, and the footprint of the building is around 320m^{2}.

The site of the church was nominated as "Historical Protection Site" in 1992. However, it is now occupied by a military unit as a printing factory, and is in a poor state of disrepair.

== Photo gallery ==
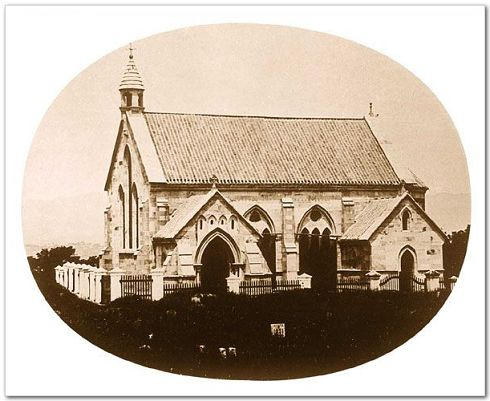
ca. 1880

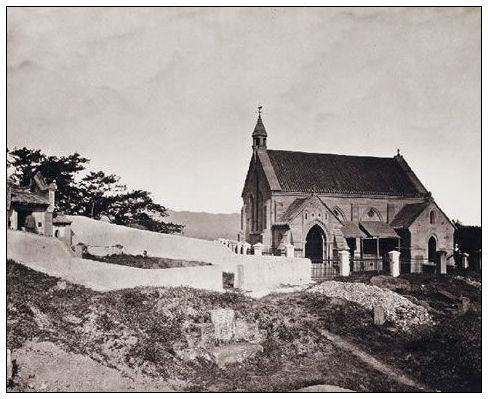
ca. 1880

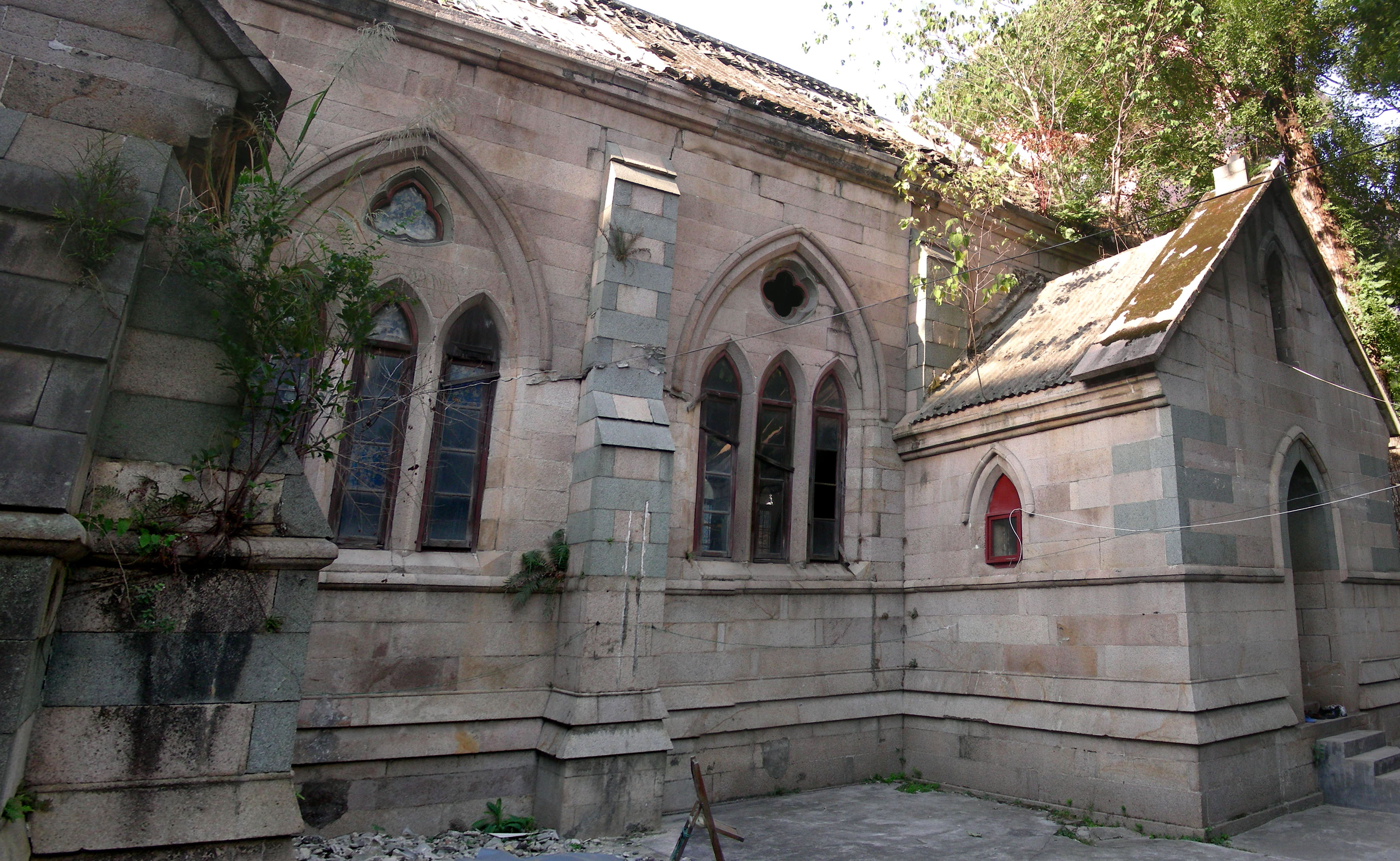
2008

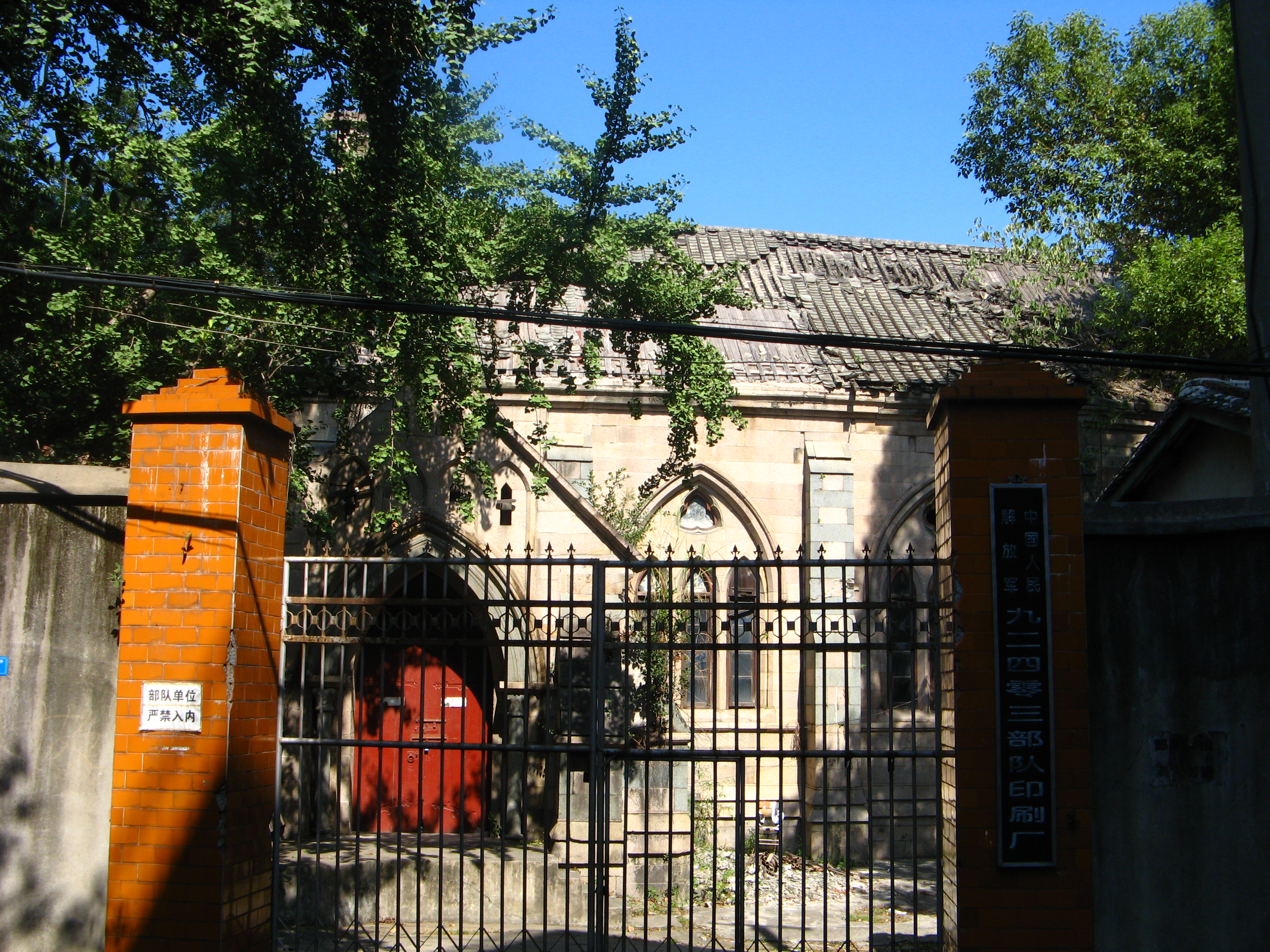
2009

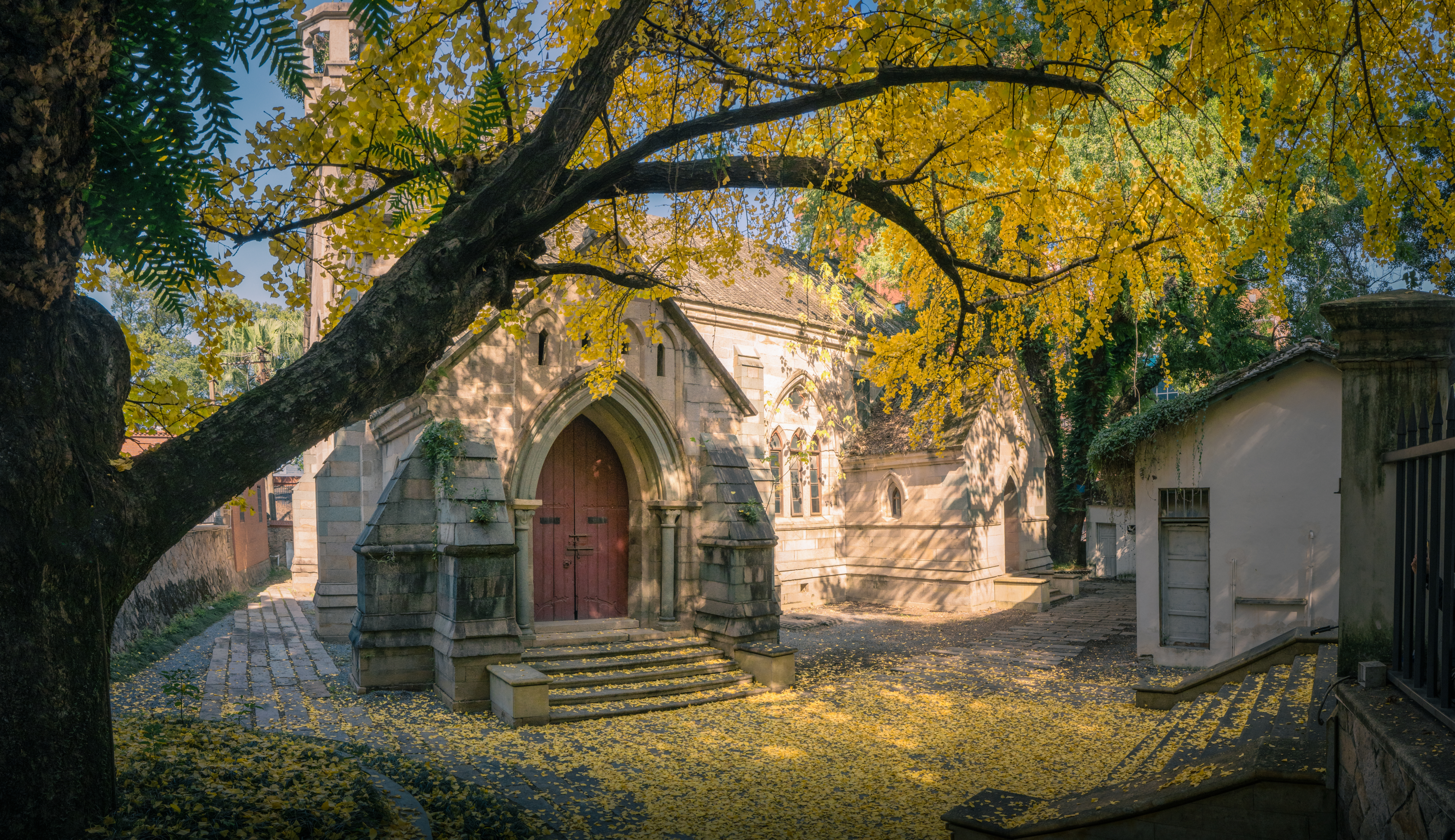
2024
