= John Wu Shi-zhen =

Chinese Roman Catholic archbishop

- Archbishop of Nanchang
- Native name: 吳仕珍
- Church: Catholic Church
- Archdiocese: Archdiocese of Nanchang
- In office: 21 July 1991 – 25 August 2014
- Predecessor: Joseph Zhou Ji-shi
- Successor: John Baptist Li Suguang
- Previous post: Auxiliary Bishop of Nanchang (1987-1991)

Orders
- Ordination: 25 March 1949 by William Charles Quinn
- Consecration: 6 September 1987 by Joseph Zong Huaide

Personal details
- Born: 19 January 1921 Fuzhou, Jiangxi, Republic of China
- Died: 25 August 2014 (aged 93) Nanchang, Jiangxi, China

John Wu Shi-zhen (Chinese: 吳仕珍; 19 January 1921 – 25 August 2014) was a Chinese Roman Catholic archbishop.

Born in China, Wu Shi-zhen was ordained a priest in 1949. On 6 September 1987, he was clandestinely consecrated as bishop, and from 1990 to 2011 was an archbishop ordinary of the Roman Catholic Archdiocese of Nanchang.
