= Diocese of Yujiang =

Roman Catholic diocese in China

Diocese of Yujiang Dioecesis Iüchiamensis 天主教余江教区

Location
- Country: China
- Ecclesiastical province: Nanchang
- Metropolitan: Nanchang

Information
- Denomination: Catholic Church
- Rite: Latin Rite
- Cathedral: Cathedral of St Louis in Yujiang, Yingtan

Current leadership
- Pope: Leo XIV
- Bishop: Sede vacante

The Roman Catholic Diocese of Yujiang/Yükíang (Latin: Iüchiamen(sis), Chinese: 餘江) is a diocese located in Yujiang (Jiangxi) in the ecclesiastical province of Nanchang in China.

== History ==
- 28 August 1885: Established as the Apostolic Vicariate of Eastern Kiangsi 江西東境 from the Apostolic Vicariate of Northern Kiangsi 江西北境
- 25 August 1920: Renamed as Apostolic Vicariate of Fuzhou 抚州
- 1 June 1921: Renamed as Apostolic Vicariate of Yujiang 餘江
- 11 April 1946: Promoted as Diocese of Yujiang 餘江

== Leadership ==
- Bishops of Yujiang 餘江 (Roman rite)
  - Bishop John Peng Weizhao (2014 – 2022), appointed Auxiliary Bishop of Nanchang 南昌
  - Bishop Thomas Zeng Jing-mu (1988 – 2014), retired
  - Bishop William Charles Quinn, C.M. (11 April 1946 – 12 March 1960)
- Vicars Apostolic of Yujiang 餘江 (Roman Rite)
  - Bishop William Charles Quinn, C.M. (28 May 1940 – 11 April 1946)
  - Bishop Paul Bergan Misner, C.M. (10 December 1934 – 3 November 1938)
  - Bishop Edward T. Sheehan, C.M. (4 February 1929 – 9 September 1933)
  - Bishop Jean-Louis Clerc-Renaud, C.M. (19 August 1912 – 5 January 1928), resigned
- Vicars Apostolic of Eastern Kiangsi 江西東境 (Roman Rite)
  - Bishop Casimir Vic, C.M. (11 July 1885 – 2 June 1912)
