= Diocese of Xiamen =

Roman Catholic diocese in China

Coordinates: 24.4667°N 118.0830°E

Diocese of Xiamen Dioecesis Sciiamenensis 天主教厦门教区

Location
- Country: China
- Territory: Xiamen; Quanzhou; Putian; Zhangzhou; Zhangping of Longyan
- Ecclesiastical province: Fuzhou
- Metropolitan: Fuzhou

Statistics
- Area: 30,000 km^{2} (12,000 sq mi)
- Population: Total; Catholics: (as of 1950); 7,500,000; 16,588 (0.2%)

Information
- Rite: Latin Rite
- Cathedral: Cathedral of Christ the King in Xiamen

Current leadership
- Pope: Leo XIV
- Bishop: Joseph Liu Hengping
- Metropolitan Archbishop: Joseph Cai Bingrui

The Roman Catholic Diocese of Xiamen/Amoy/Hsíamen (Latin: Sciiamenen(sis), Chinese: 廈門) is a diocese located in the city of Xiamen (Fujian) in the ecclesiastical province of Fuzhou in China.

== History ==
- December 3, 1883: Established as Apostolic Vicariate of Amoy 廈門 from the Apostolic Vicariate of Northern Fo-kien 福建北境
- April 11, 1946: Promoted as Diocese of Xiamen 廈門

== Leadership ==
- Bishops of Xiamen 廈門 (Roman rite)
  - Bishop Joseph Liu Hengping (Since November 18, 2026)
  - Bishop Joseph Cai Bingrui (2010–2025)
  - Bishop Joseph Huang Ziyu (1986–1991)
  - Bishop Juan Bautista Velasco Díaz, O.P. (June 10, 1948–May 1983)
  - Bishop Manuel Prat Pujoldevall, O.P. (April 11, 1946–January 6, 1947)
- Vicars Apostolic of Amoy 廈門 (Roman Rite)
  - Bishop Manuel Prat Pujoldevall, O.P.(January 27, 1916–April 11, 1946)
  - Bishop Isidoro Clemente Gutiérrez, O.P. (August 7, 1899–August 10, 1915.)
  - Bishop Esteban Sánchez de las Heras, O.P. (January 19, 1895–June 21, 1896)
  - Bishop Ignacio Ibáñez, O.P. (May 4, 1893–October 14, 1893)
  - Bishop Andrés Chinchón, O.P. (December 11, 1883–May 1, 1892)
