= St. Dominic's Cathedral, Fuzhou =

Coordinates: 26°03′04″N 119°19′12″E

- Fuzhou Fanchuanpu St. Dominic's Cathedral
- Fanchuanpu Tianzhutang (Pan-ship Oura Catholic Church)
- 福州泛船浦圣多明我主教座堂
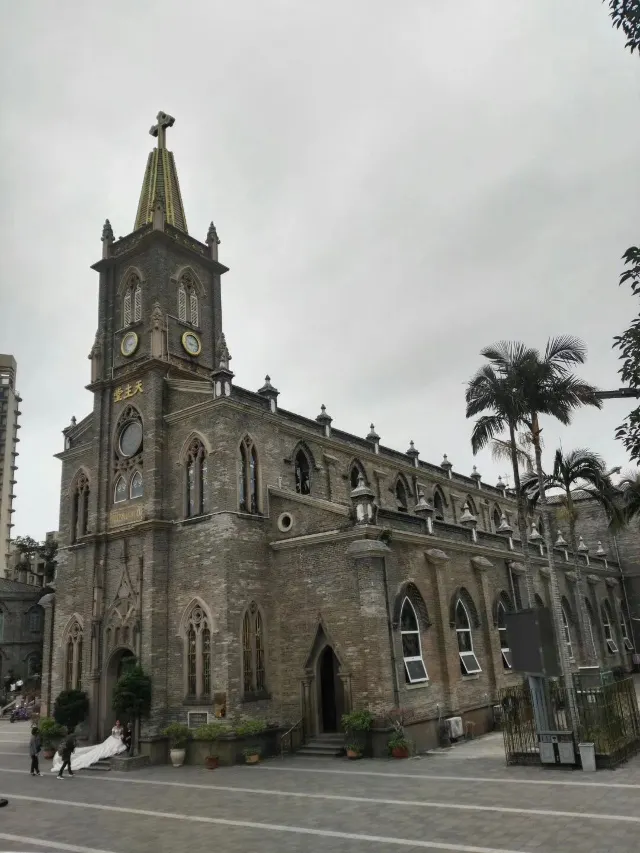
- Cathedral church of the Metropolitan Archdiocese of Fuzhou
- St. Dominic's Cathedral, Fuzhou
- Country: China
- Denomination: Catholic

History
- Status: Metropolitan Cathedral Church
- Founded: 1864

Architecture
- Functional status: Active
- Heritage designation: Major cultural relics of the Fujian Province
- Designated: 1996
- Previous cathedrals: The Aowei Church of Holy Rosary
- Style: Gothic Revival, Neo-Romanesque, Neo-Classical, Chinese
- Groundbreaking: 1932
- Completed: September 1933

Specifications
- Capacity: 3000
- Length: 60.2 Meters
- Width: 19.52 Meters
- Materials: Chinese Green Brick

Administration
- Archdiocese: Fuzhou

Clergy
- Archbishop: Peter Lin Jia-shan

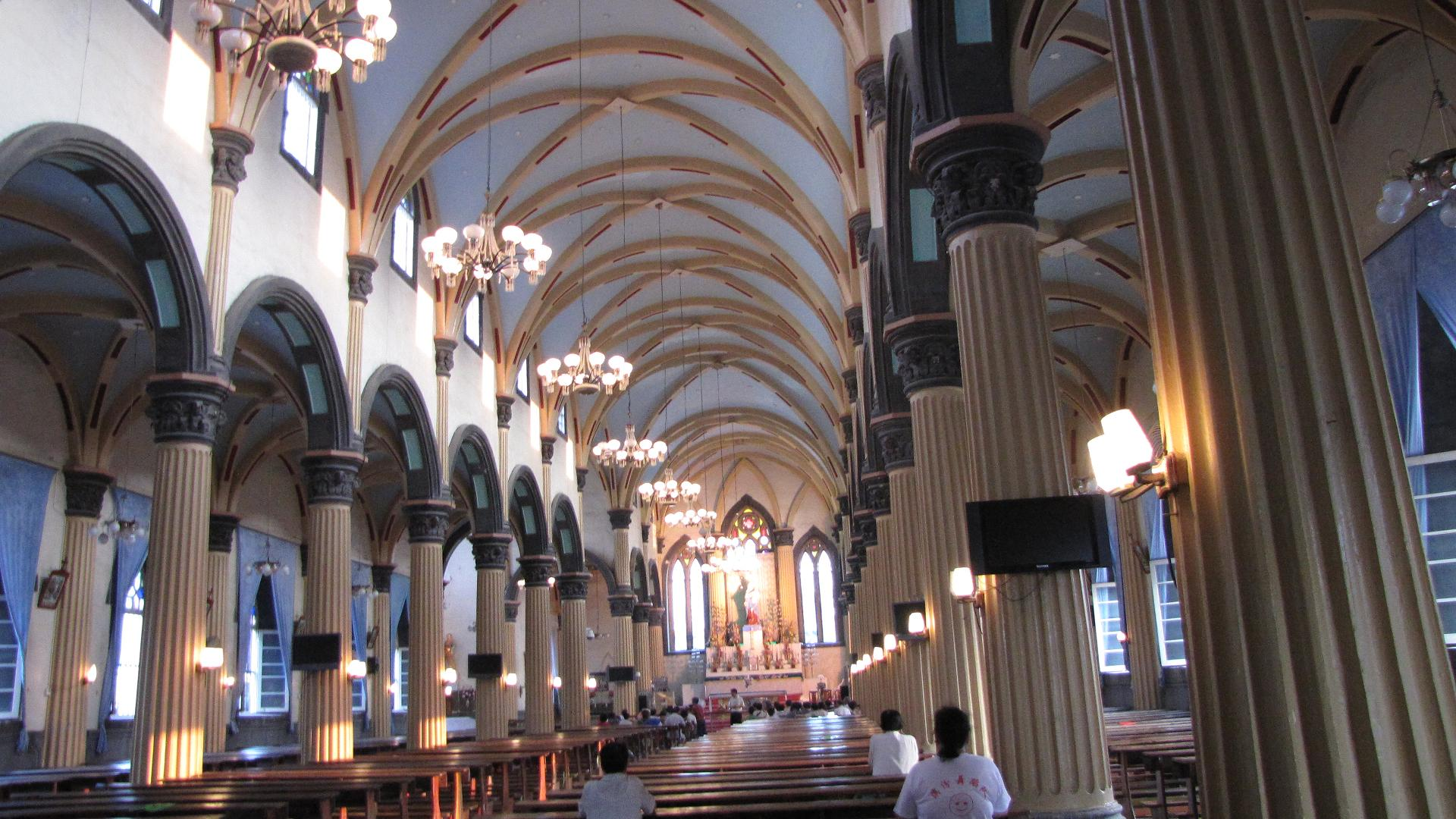
The interior of the cathedral prior to the 2017 renovation

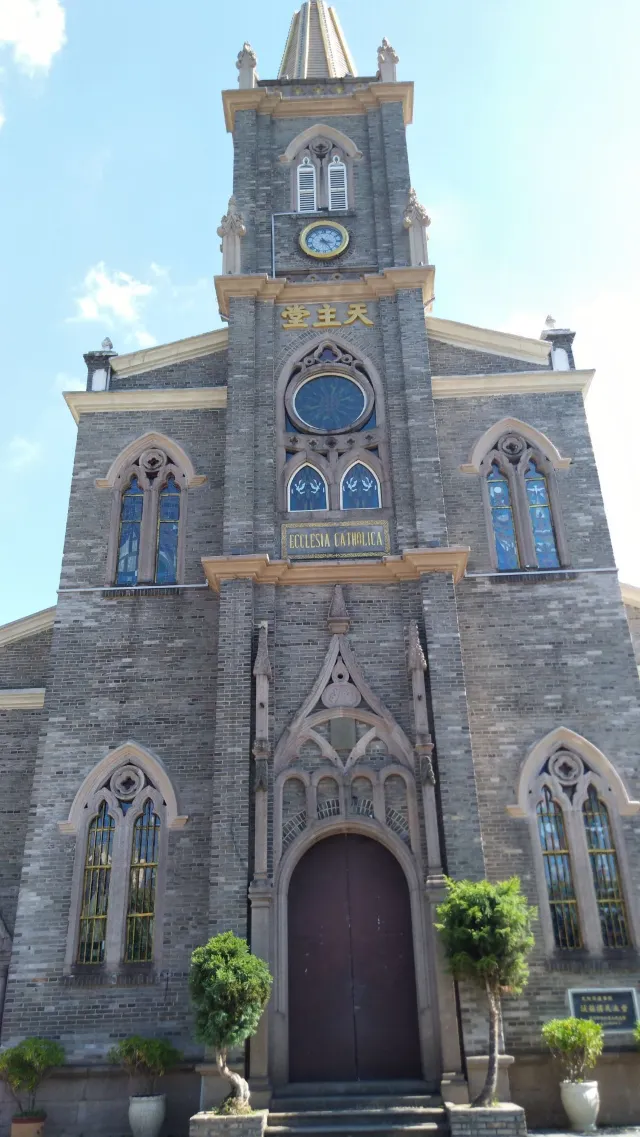
A view of St. Dominic's Cathedral after the 2017 renovation, notice the newly added leaded stained-glass windows, as seen on the front

St. Dominic's Cathedral (Chinese: 福州圣多明我主教座堂), locally known as the Fanchuanpu Catholic Church (Chinese: 泛船浦天主堂, lit. 'Pan-ship Oura Catholic Church'), is located by the Min River, Fuzhou, Fujian, China. It is the seat of the Metropolitan Archdiocese of Fuzhou and the Ecclesiastical Province of Fuzhou.

== History ==
It was first established in the third year of Tongzhi in the Qing dynasty (1864) by the Spanish Dominicans. In 1911, it was erected as the cathedral church of the Archdiocese of Fuzhou. In the 21st year of the Republic of China (1932) the old building was demolished and the present cathedral was begun in an area of 1371.4 square meters that can accommodate 3,000 people. It was known as "The Grandest Church in the South of Yangtze", and it is still the largest Catholic church in Fujian today. It was said that the sound of its bells ringing can be heard from more than ten miles away.

Before 1949, of the approximately 10,000 Catholics of Fuzhou, approximately half belonged to the cathedral (5,153 people).

During the Cultural Revolution, the church was attacked by the Red Guards in 1966, who then proceeded to removing the cross from the spire atop the cathedral tower. The cathedral was closed and used for other purposes. It was reopened in 1985. In 1994, the Cathedral of St. Dominic was the center of worship of about 16,000 Catholics and still serves as the place of worship for half of the Catholic population of Fuzhou.

== The cathedral complex ==
Other than the cathedral itself, several other buildings form the cathedral complex:

- The Cathedral Rectory
- The Archdiocesan Center and Office
- The Cathedral Garden, which contains a large standing crucifix; a shrine to the Immaculate Heart of Mary/Our Lady of Fatima; a shrine to St. Therese; a statue of Sacred Heart of Jesus erected in the year 1990; a sculptural group featuring Christ as the Good Shepherd; stones engraved with biblical passages in Chinese; light-up religious texts; statues of angels and various saints, including Sts. Peter and Paul the Apostles, St. John Bosco, St. Michael the Archangel, etc.
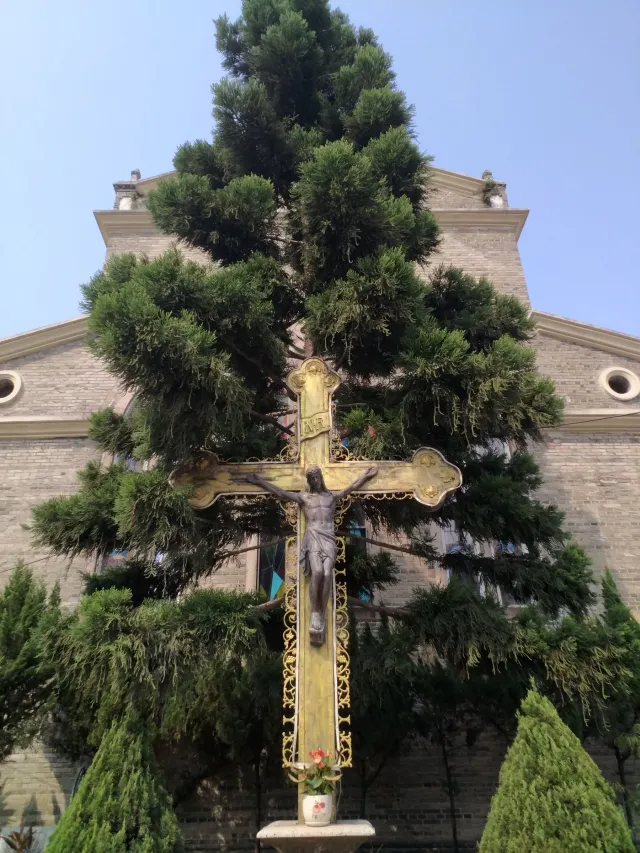
The outdoor crucifix, located behind the chancel

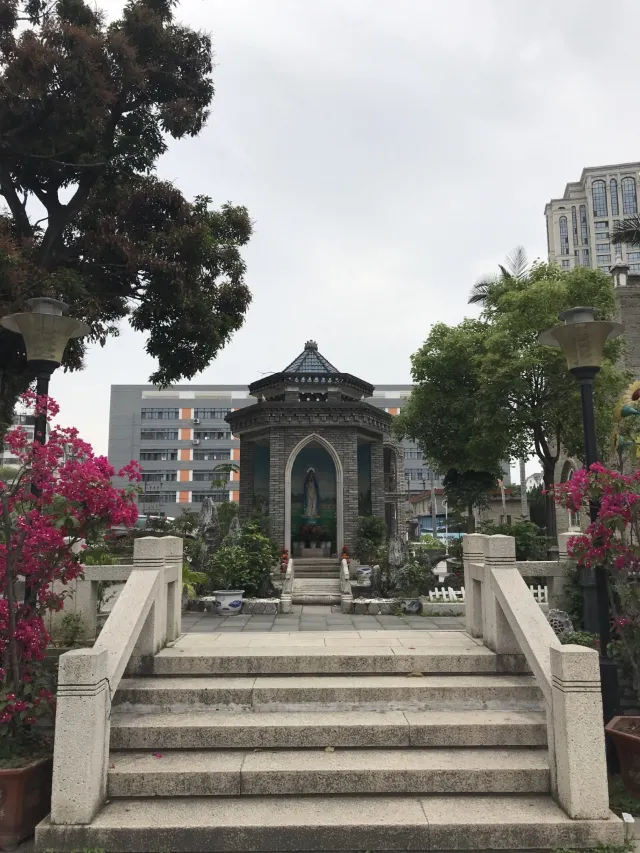
Shrine of the Immaculate Heart of Mary/Our Lady of Fatima

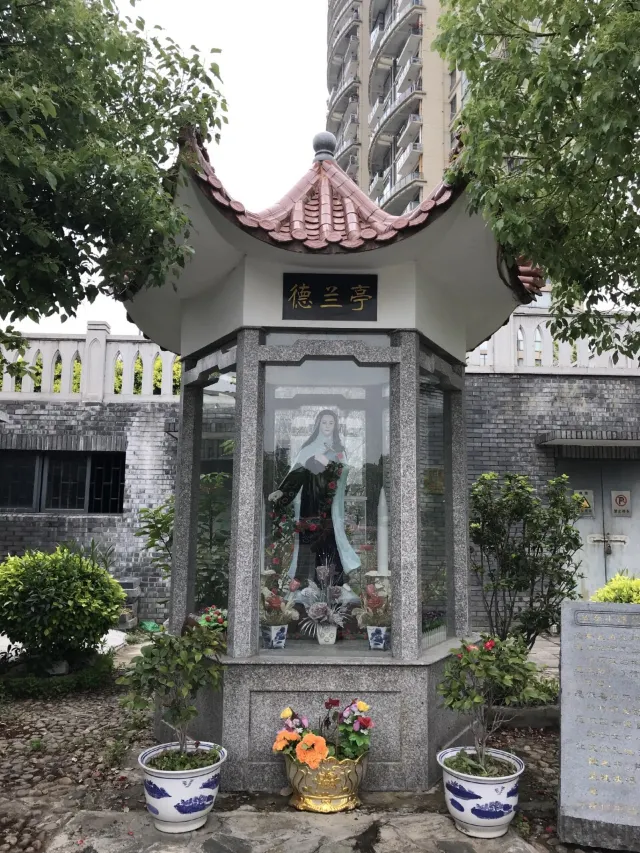
Shrine of St. Therese

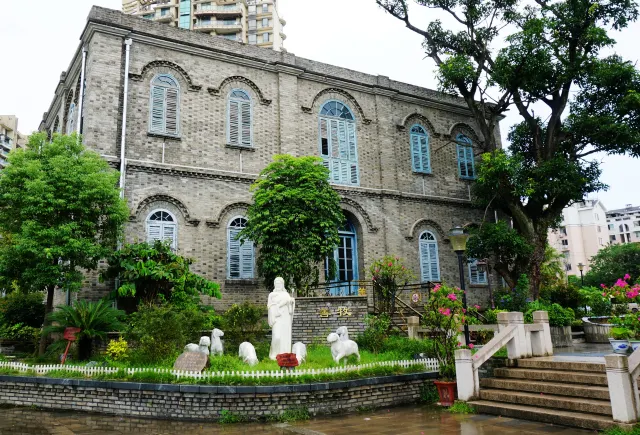
Side of the Cathedral Rectory. The Good Shepherd Sculptural Group is in the foreground.

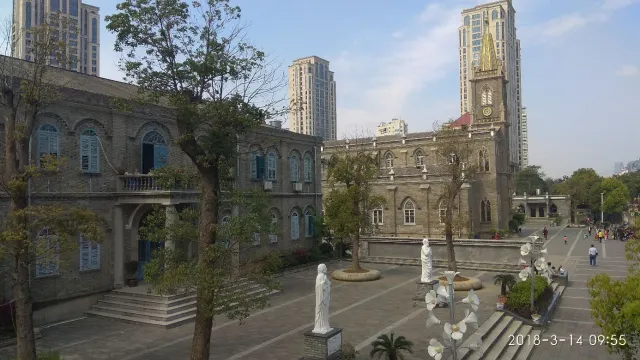
Statues of Sts. Peter and Paul the Apostles in front of the Cathedral Rectory

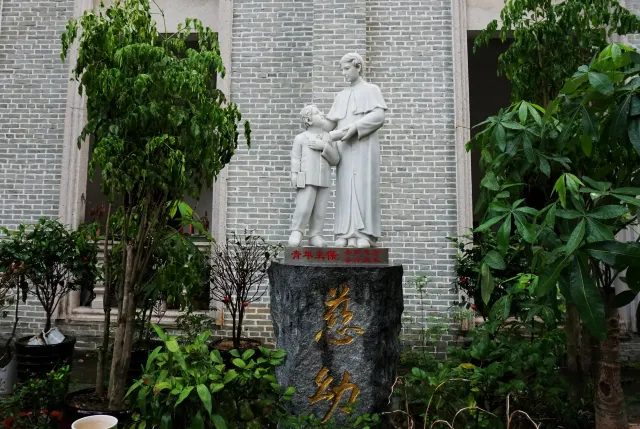
Statue of St. John Bosco with St. Dominic Savio

== Architecture and interior ==
=== Architecture ===
The cathedral is built in the Gothic Revival style, however with Neoclassical, Romanesque Revival, and Chinese touches, as respectively seen in the pillars of the nave, the rounded-arches found throughout the building, and many of the exterior pinnacles, which makes the cathedral unique within the realm of ecclesiastical construction. The cathedral follows a typical basilica floor plan with two rows of 11 Corinthian columns separating the nave from the two aisles. The cathedral also features the ribbed groin vaults—a common feature of the medieval cathedrals of Europe. The vaults of St. Dominic's Cathedral are painted blue and dotted with stars. This is a common feature among cathedrals and churches built in the neo-Gothic style, such as the Sainte Chapelle in Paris, France, or the Notre Dame Basilica in Montreal, Canada.

=== Altars ===
The cathedral contains five altars. The high altar of the cathedral is topped by a statue of Our Lady of the Rosary, who revealed to St. Dominic the Catholic devotion of the Rosary. There are also four side altars in four side chapels within the cathedral: the north-transept altar of St. Joseph; the south-transept altar of St. Therese; the altar at the chapel of the Sacred Heart at the rear of the north aisle, which was later rededicated to St. Vincent Ferrer; and the altar at the chapel of the Immaculate Heart of Mary at the rear of the south aisle, which was later rededicated to St. Francis Xavier in 2017, but eventually rededicated to St. Peter Sanz, a bishop of the Archdiocese of Fuzhou. The rededications of the two rear-end chapels to Sts. Vincent Ferrer and Peter Sanz is reminiscent of the cathedral's Dominican foundations and are possibly restorations of the original dedications of the altars from before the destructions brought by Cultural Revolution. The relics of St. Joseph and St. Therese are placed in the central niche of their respective altars.

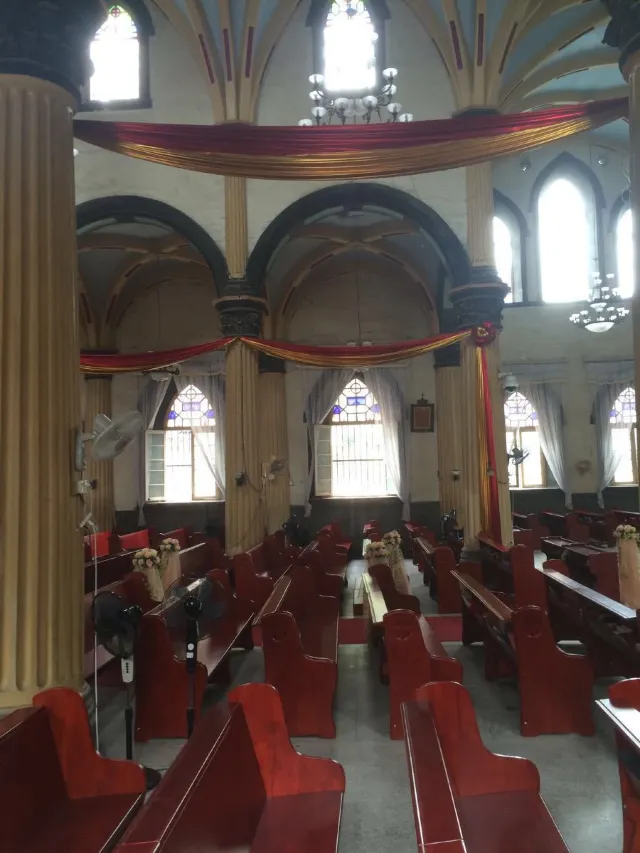
Side of the nave before the addition of the new windows

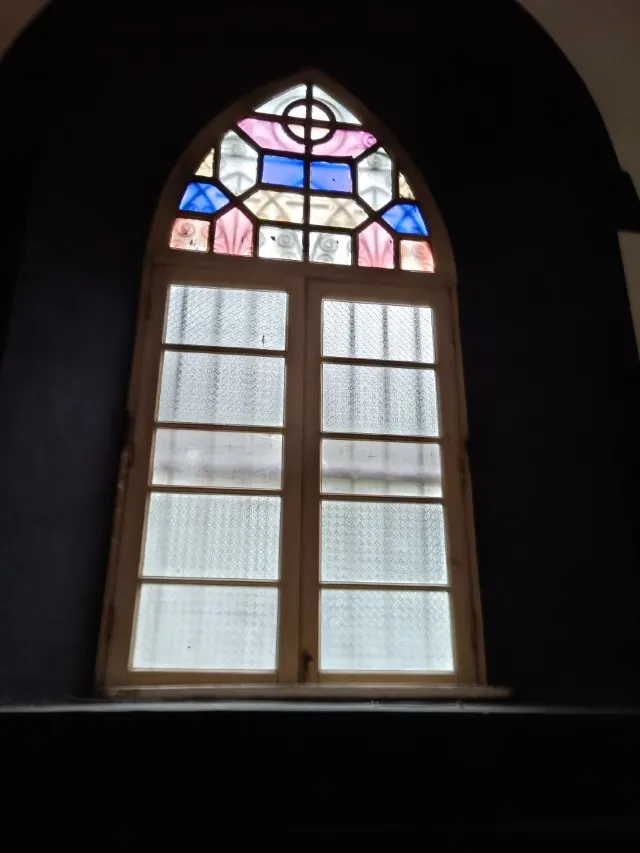
One of the old nave windows

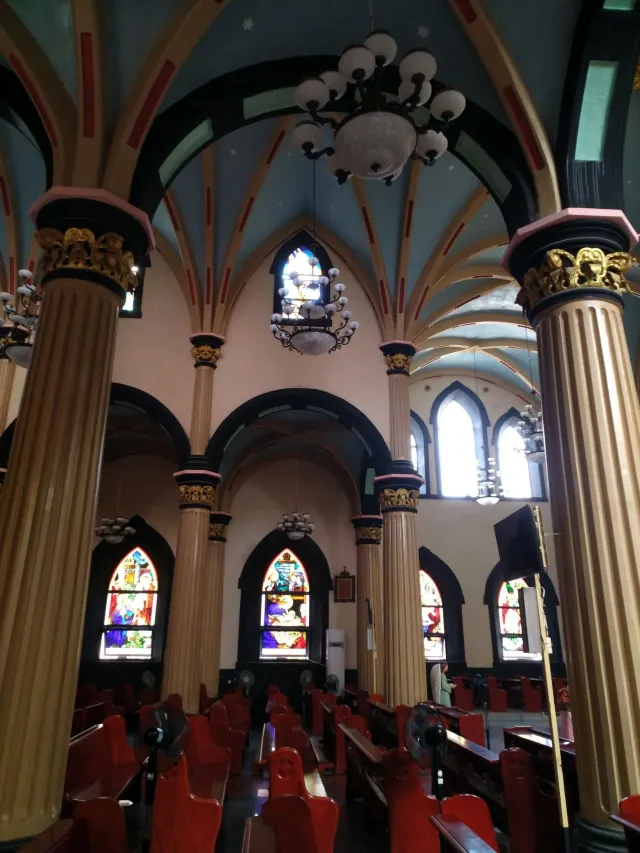
Side of the nave after the new stained-glass windows have been installed

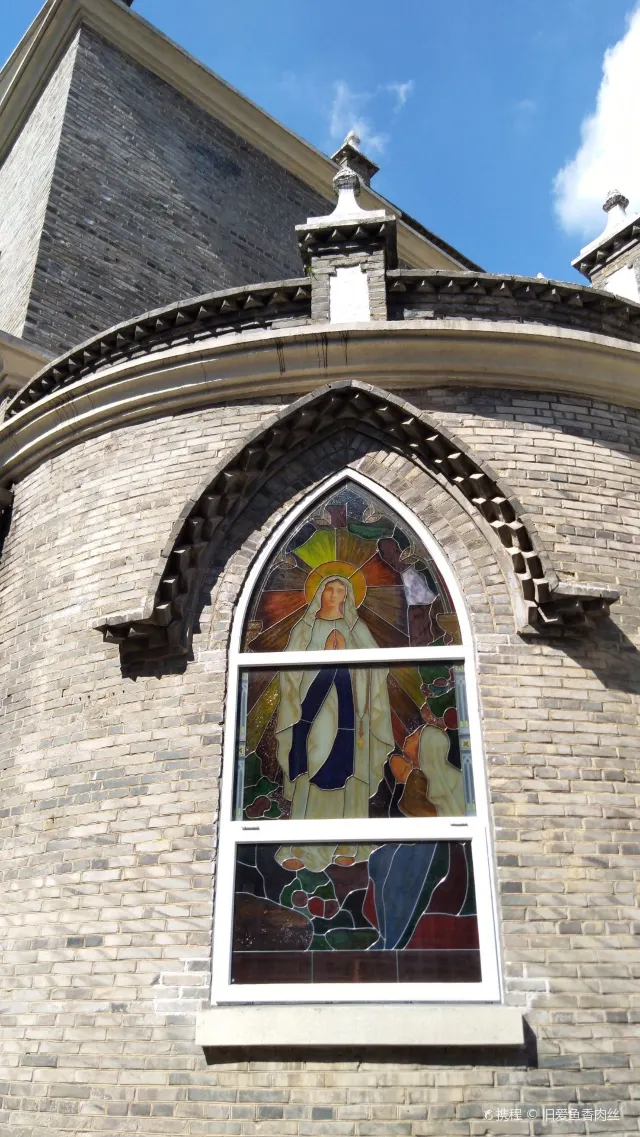
Exterior view of one of the new windows. This window shows the Apparition of Blessed Virgin Mary to St. Bernadette Soubirous in Lourdes.

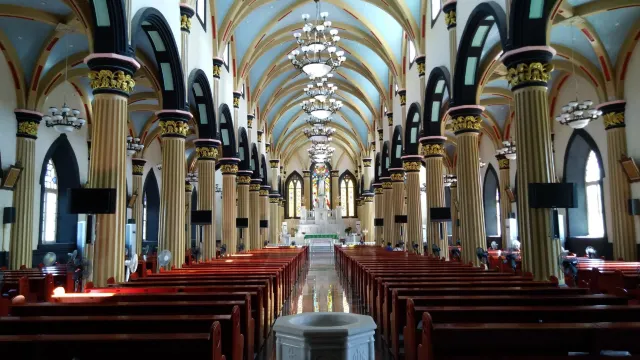
The cathedral interior after the 2017 renovation

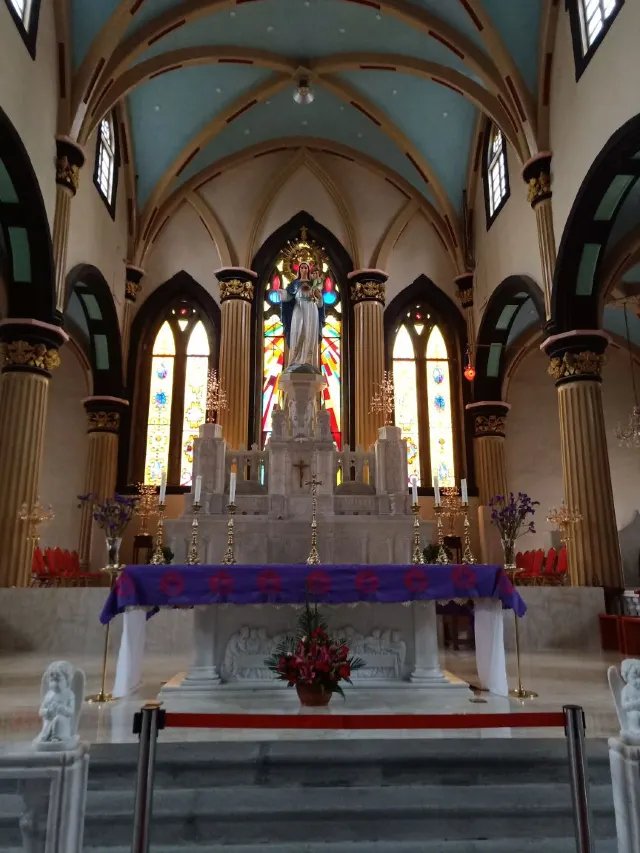
The high altar

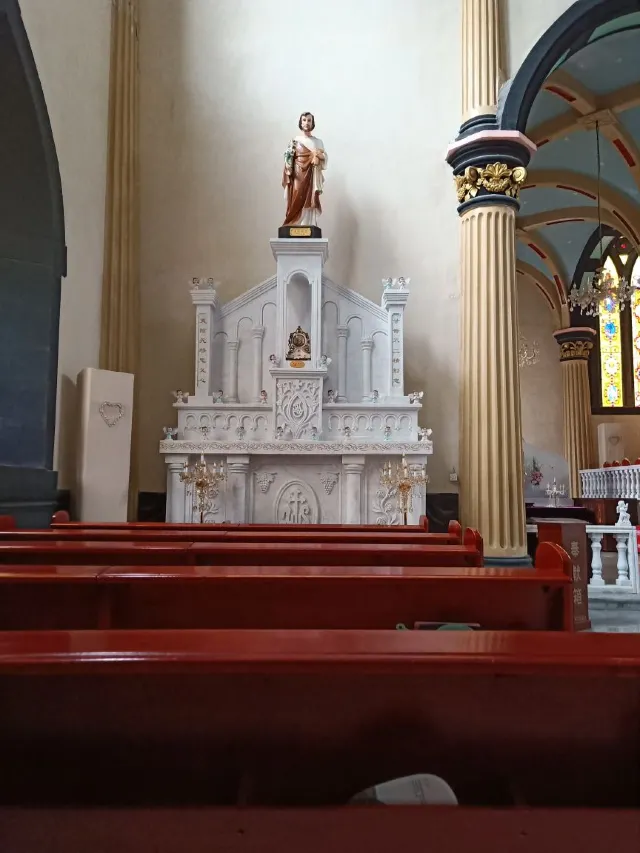
St. Joseph's Chapel

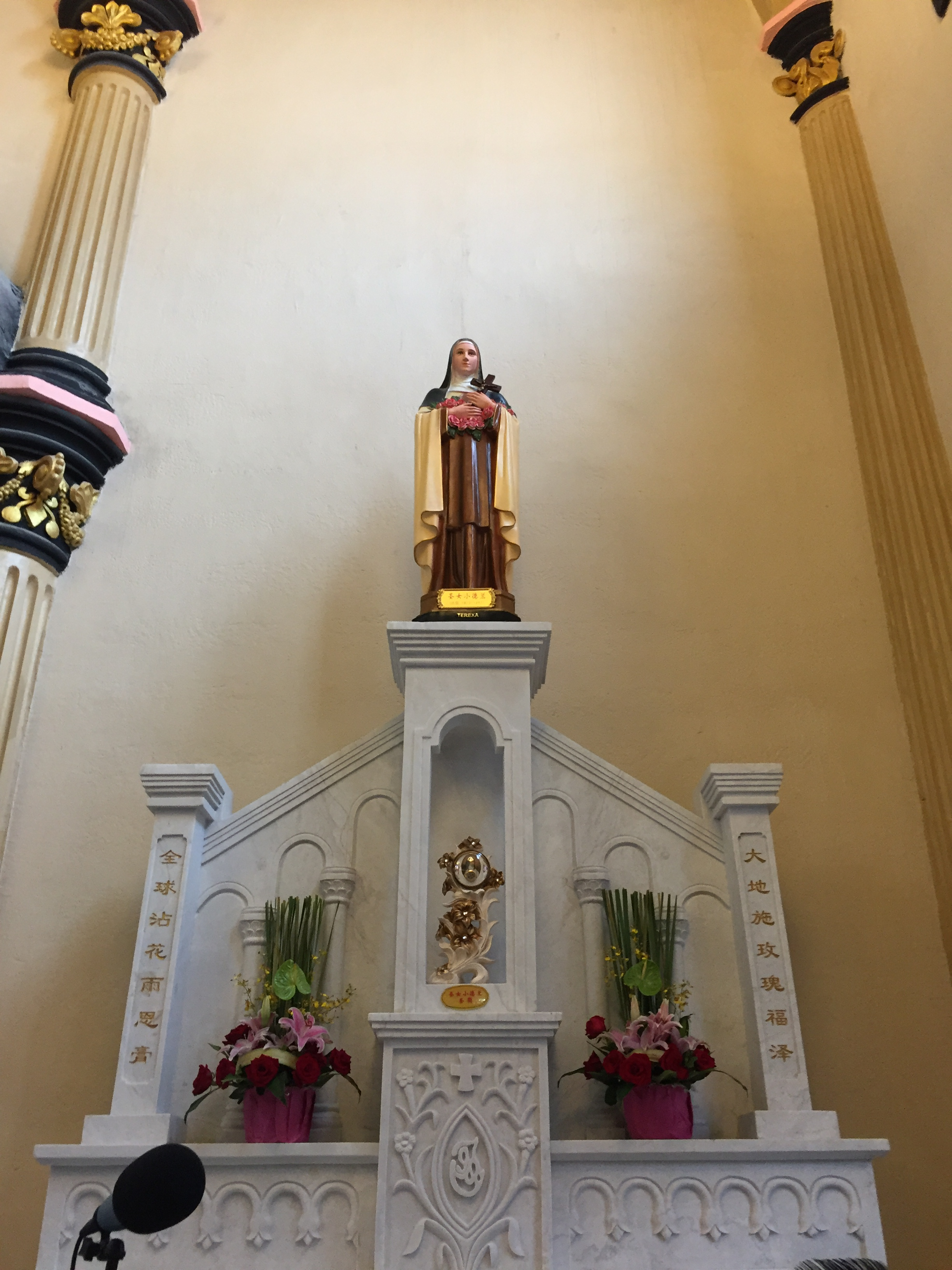
Altar/Shrine inside St. Therese's Chapel

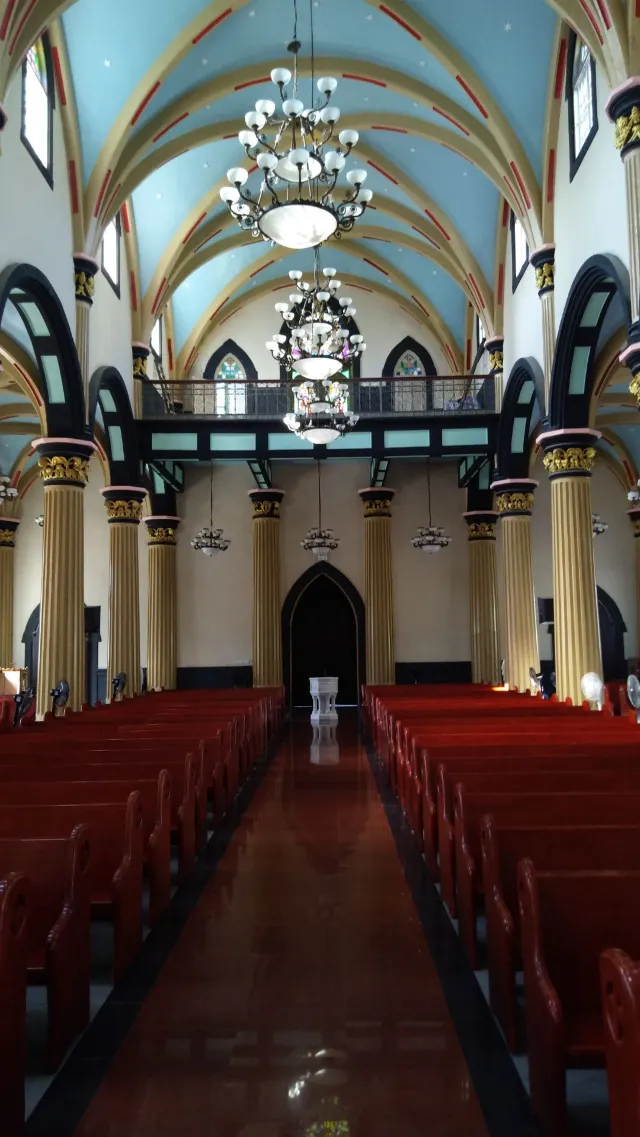
View of the choir loft

== Renovations ==
To reverse the damages inflicted upon the cathedral during the Cultural Revolution as well as the deteriorations throughout the years, the cathedral was heavily renovated and restored in 2017. The nave column capitals were gilded to highlight the details. The walls of the cathedral, now covered with mold due to the damp climate of South China, were cleaned and whitewashed. Leaded stained-glass windows featuring simple designs were specially commissioned and installed on the west-end of the cathedral as well as the three east windows featuring the Holy Spirit and the Seven Sacraments of the Catholic Church in the chancel. In addition, a new marble high altar and Versus Populum Altar, Ambo, baptismal font, Altar of St. Joseph, and Altar of St. Therese, as well as new matching altar rails were commissioned and was installed at the cathedral. Other changes included the addition of new angel holy water basins and the removal of the curtains and the curtain rods of the nave windows.

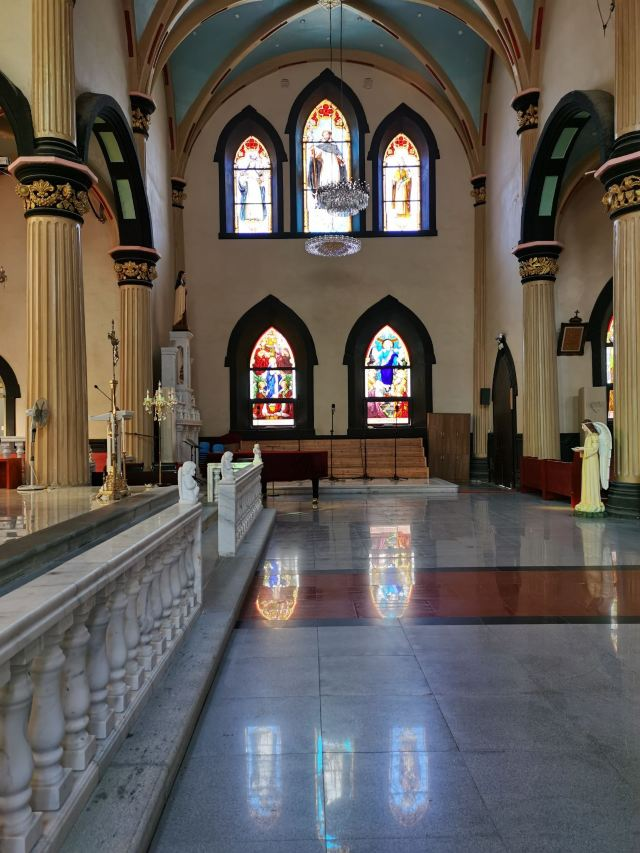
The south transept

The more complicated leaded painted stained-glass windows featuring biblical scenes and Marian Apparitions and other Catholic iconographies were later installed in the cathedral nave.

== 2008 cathedral rectory structural relocation ==
The church was listed among the major cultural relics of Fujian Province in 1996. Owing to Fuzhou's urban development of the South Riverside Avenue in 2008, which was projected to go through where the cathedral rectory was standing, the cathedral rectory was structurally relocated. The cathedral rectory structural relocation was conducted by the Academy of Building Research in order to make some modifications without altering its beauty and original conception. The cathedral rectory was moved 80 meters from its original location and rotated 90 degrees to make way for the street construction.
