= Diocese of Ganzhou =

Roman Catholic diocese in China

Diocese of Ganzhou Dioecesis Canceuvensis 天主教赣州教区

Location
- Country: China
- Ecclesiastical province: Nanchang
- Metropolitan: Nanchang

Statistics
- Area: 88,609 km^{2} (34,212 sq mi)
- Population: Total; Catholics: (as of 1950); 3,000,000; 15,145 (0.5%)

Information
- Rite: Latin Rite
- Cathedral: Cathedral in Ganzhou

Current leadership
- Pope: Leo XIV
- Bishop: Sede Vacante

The Roman Catholic Diocese of Ganzhou/Kanchow (Latin: Canceuven(sis), Chinese: 贛州) is a diocese located in the city of Ganzhou (Jiangxi) in the ecclesiastical province of Nanchang in China.

== History ==
- August 25, 1920: Established as Apostolic Vicariate of Ganzhou 贛州 from the Apostolic Vicariate of Southern Kiangsi 江西南境
- April 11, 1946: Promoted as Diocese of Ganzhou 贛州

== Leadership ==
- Bishops of Ganzhou 贛州 (Roman rite)
  - Bishop John A. O'Shea, C.M. (April 11, 1946 – October 10, 1969)
- Vicars Apostolic of Ganzhou 贛州 (Roman Rite)
  - Bishop John A. O'Shea, C.M. (July 3, 1931 – April 11, 1946)
  - Bishop Paul-Marie Dumond, C.M. (May 12, 1925 – July 3, 1931)
  - Bishop Paul-Marie Dumond, C.M. (Apostolic Administrator July 21, 1920 – May 12, 1925)
