= Archdiocese of Fuzhou =

Roman Catholic archdiocese in China

Coordinates: 26.2667°N 119.2170°E

Archdiocese of Fuzhou Archidioecesis Fuceuvensis 天主教福州总教区
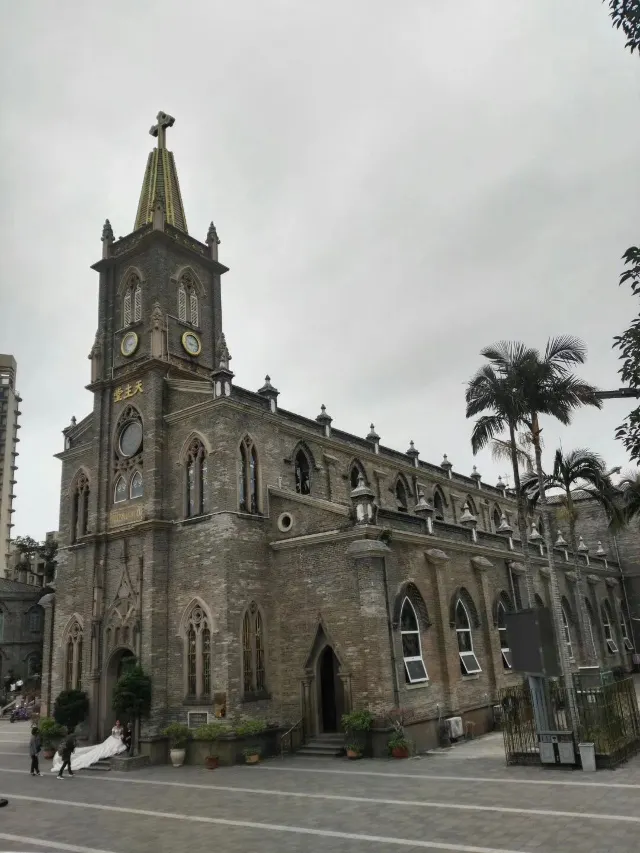
- St Dominic's Cathedral, Fuzhou

Location
- Country: China
- Territory: Fuzhou; Yong'an, Datian County, Youxi County, Sha County, and Jiangle County of Sanming; Gutian County and Pingnan County of Ningde; Yanping District and Shunchang County of Nanping
- Ecclesiastical province: Fuzhou

Statistics
- Area: 32,348 km^{2} (12,490 sq mi)
- Population: Total; Catholics: (as of 1950); 2,975,730; 40,525 (1.4%)

Information
- Denomination: Catholic
- Rite: Latin Rite
- Cathedral: Saint Dominic's Cathedral, Fuzhou

Current leadership
- Pope: Leo XIV
- Metropolitan Archbishop: Joseph Cai Bingrui
- Auxiliary Bishops: Joseph Lin Yuntuan

The Roman Catholic Archdiocese of Fuzhou (Latin: Fuceuven(sis), Chinese: 福州) is an archdiocese centred on the city of Fuzhou in China.

== History ==
- 1680: the Apostolic Vicariate of Fujian was established and separated from the Apostolic Vicariate of Cochin
- In 1838, Bishop Roque José Carpena Díaz advised the Holy See that "he could no longer administer the provinces of Tche-Kiang and Kiang-si, entrusted to him since 1798, as he [was] too busy and absorbed in the many cares of such a vast Vicariate". Accordingly, Pope Gregory XVI agreed to separate these two provinces from Carpena Diaz' territory.
- On October 3, 1883, the area was renamed as Apostolic Vicariate of Northern Fo-kien
- On December 27, 1923, it was renamed as Apostolic Vicariate of Fuzhou
- The Metropolitan Archdiocese of Fuzhou was established on 11 April 1946.

== Significant churches ==
- Former Cathedral:
  - 澳尾巷玫瑰圣母堂
    (The Aowei Church of Our Lady of Rosary)
- St Dominic's Cathedral

== Leadership ==
Vicars Apostolic of Fujian / Fo-kien 福建 (Roman Rite)

- Bishop François Pallu, M.E.P. (陸方濟) (April 15, 1680 – October 29, 1684)
- Bishop Charles Maigrot, M.E.P. (颜当) (July 25, 1684 – 1709)
- Bishop St. Pedro Sans i Jordà, O.P. (白多祿) (January 3, 1732 – May 26, 1747)
- Bishop Eusebio Oscot, O.P. (October 1, 1737 – November 28, 1743)
- Bishop Francisco Pallás Faro, O.P. (July 11, 1753 – March 1778)
- Bishop José Calvo, O.P. (February 16, 1781 – October 15, 1812)
- Bishop Roque José Carpena Díaz, O.P. (October 15, 1812 – December 30, 1849)
- Bishop Miguel Calderón, O.P. (December 30, 1849 – February 14, 1883)

Vicars Apostolic of Northern Fo-kien 福建北境 (Roman Rite)

- Bishop Salvador Masot y Gómez, O.P. (蘇瑪素) (June 20, 1884 – March 17, 1911)

Vicars Apostolic of Fuzhou 福州 (Roman Rite)

- Bishop Francisco Aguirre Murga, O.P. (宋金铃) (December 13, 1911 – June 12, 1941)

Archbishops of Fuzhou (Roman rite)

- Archbishop Theodore Labrador Fraile, O.P. (趙炳文) (June 13, 1946 – May 6, 1980)
- Archbishop John Er-shi Ye (葉而適) (February 2, 1984 – February 23, 1991)
- Archbishop John Shu-dao Yang (楊樹道) (1995 – August 28, 2010)
- Archbishop Peter Lin Jiashan (林佳善) (August 28, 2010 – April 14, 2023)
- Archbishop Joseph Cai Bingrui (January 23, 2025 -)

Auxiliary Bishops of Fuzhou

- Bishop Joseph Lin Yuntuan

== Suffragan dioceses ==
- Funing 福寧
- Tingzhou 汀州
- Xiamen 廈門
