= Methodius Qu Ailin =

Chinese Roman Catholic Bishop

The Most Revd. Methodius Qu Ailin
- Archbishop of Changsha
- Native name: 屈蔼林
- Church: Catholic
- Archdiocese: Changsha
- Province: Hunan
- Metropolis: Changsha
- Elected: 19 December 2011
- Installed: 2012

Orders
- Ordination: 1995
- Consecration: 2012

Personal details
- Born: May 1961 (age 65) Hengyang, Hunan, China
- Denomination: Roman Catholic
- Residence: Changsha, Hunan, China
- Education: Hengyang Basic University; Beijing Theological and Philosophical College
- Coat of arms

Chinese name
- Traditional Chinese: 屈藹林
- Simplified Chinese: 屈蔼林
Transcriptions
Standard Mandarin
- Hanyu Pinyin: Qū Ǎilín

Methodius Qu Ailin (Chinese: 屈蔼林; born May 1961) is a Chinese Roman Catholic Bishop of Roman Catholic Diocese of Hunan, China.

== Biography ==
Qu was born in Hengyang, Hunan in May 1961. After the resumption of College Entrance Examination, he graduated from the Hengyang Basic University. He joined the church at the end of 1990. He was accepted to the Central South School of Theological Philosophy in 1991. He studied at the Beijing Theological and Philosophical College between 1992 and 1995. He became a priest in June 1995 and that same year he served as a priest at the Hengyang Catholic Church. He was ordained archbishop in 1999 by Bishop of Roman Catholic Diocese of Hunan Simon Qu Tianxi. On December 19, 2011, he was elected as Bishop of Roman Catholic Diocese of Hunan (Archbishop of Changsha and Apostolic Administrator of the Dioceses and Prefectures in Hunan).

In November 2025, Qu was found guilty with two priests and a member of the church for embezzlement, was sentenced to six to seven years in prison.

== See also ==
- Qu (surname 屈)
- Roman Catholic Archdiocese of Changsha
