= Peter Lin Jiashan =

Chinese Roman Catholic bishop (1934–2023)

The Most Reverend Peter Lin Jiashan
- Archbishop of Fuzhou
- Archdiocese: Fuzhou
- See: Fuzhou
- Appointed: 9 June 2020
- Installed: 9 June 2020
- Term ended: 14 April 2023
- Predecessor: John Shu-dao Yang
- Successor: Vacant
- Previous post: Coadjutor Bishop of Fuzhou (1997–2010)

Orders
- Ordination: 11 May 1981
- Consecration: 7 August 1987 by John Yang Shudao

Personal details
- Born: 2 September 1934
- Died: 14 April 2023 (aged 88)
- Denomination: Roman Catholic
- Coat of arms

Peter Lin Jiashan (Chinese: 林家善, 2 September 1934 – 14 April 2023) was the third China-recognized Catholic Archbishop of the Roman Catholic Archdiocese of Fuzhou, China.

== Early life ==
Lin was born on 2 September 1934.

== Priesthood ==
Lin was ordained a priest on 11 May 1981.

== Episcopate ==
Peter was consecrated a bishop on 13 July 1997 by Archbishop John Yang Shudao and was appointed coadjutor bishop of Archdiocese of Fuzhou. On 28 August 2010 he succeeded as Archbishop of the Roman Catholic Archdiocese of Fuzhou but never appointed or recognized by the government. He was recognized as a bishop in 2016 by the Holy See, but not by the Chinese government. He had been part of the underground Church because of which in the 1980s he had been sentenced to ten years of forced labor. Finally, because of the Sino-Vatican provisional agreement on the appointment of bishops he was approved and appointed archbishop of the Roman Catholic Archdiocese of Fuzhou in a state-sanctioned ceremony at Holy Rosary Church in Fuzhou on 9 June 2020.

Catholic Church titles
Preceded by John Shu-dao Yang	Archbishop of Fuzhou; 2020–2023	Succeeded by Vacant
