= Aowei Church of Our Lady of the Holy Rosary =

Catholic church in Fuzhou, China

Coordinates: 26°4′33.71″N 119°17′56.23″E

The Aowei Church of Our Lady of the Holy Rosary (Chinese: 澳尾巷玫瑰圣母堂; pinyin: ǎowěi xiàng méigūi shèngmǔ jiàotáng, literally Aowei Church of Holy Rosary) is a Catholic church in Fuzhou, China. It was founded in 1848 as a cathedral by the Dominican Order from Spain.

== History ==
This Catholic church lies in the middle of Cha-ting Avenue, and was the oldest extant Catholic church in Fuzhou in 1994. It was built as a cathedral in 1848 during the Qing Dynasty. The building is built in a unique blend of traditional Chinese architecture and Gothic style, its floor space was 507.8 m^{2} (5,466 sq ft), and it fit 1,000 people. The church was only the oldest church standing in Fuzhou before its unlawful destruction.

In 1912, the episcopal throne was moved to what then became St. Dominic's Cathedral which later became the largest Catholic church in the entire province of Fujian, and remained so to this day. After the removal of the cathedra, the Church of Our Lady of the Holy Rosary became a Dominican Priory.

In 1932, the Dominican Priory was moved to Chong-zhen Catholic Church (崇真堂) on Zhongxuan Road (中选路), and the church became an ordinary diocesan parish church.

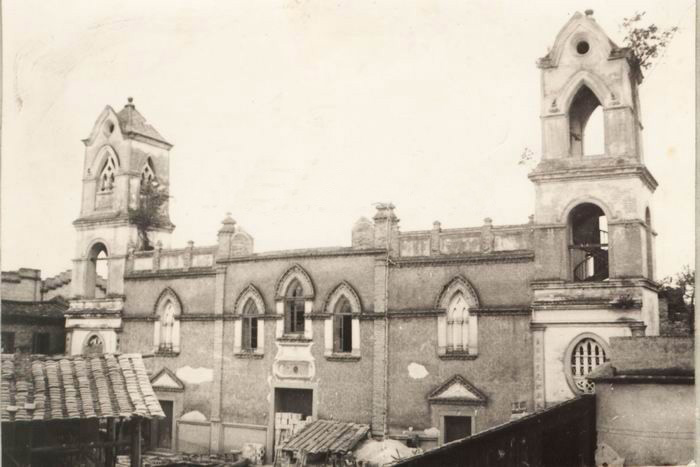
The Aowei Church of Holy Rosary

During the Cultural Revolution from 1966 to 1976, religious toleration was suppressed by the government, and the church was closed and used by a government factory, and later, when the factory was moved, the church building was given to the Children's Hospital of Fuzhou for use. While being used by the government owned factory, the church building suffered slight damage, and the north tower was demolished. In 1987, the church was given to CPCA, but remained closed and unused for unknown reasons. In the same year and again 1992, the local government announced that the building would be protected as a cultural relic after series of serious damages had been inflicted upon the church building when the sanctuary and the choir was illegally demolished due to road expansion of Cha-ting Avenue. Despite the repeated proclamation of the church building to be preserved as a historic landmark and cultural relic, the church was illegally occupied once more by the Children's Hospital of Fuzhou in 2002, and the entire building was unlawfully demolished to make way for a makeshift cafeteria.
