= Archdiocese of Nanchang =

Roman Catholic archdiocese in China

Coordinates: 28.6718°N 115.8964°E

Archdiocese of Nanchang Archidioecesis Nanciamensis 天主教南昌总教区

Location
- Country: China
- Ecclesiastical province: Nanchang

Statistics
- Population: Total; Catholics: (as of 1950); 4,872,691; 25,996 (0.5%)
- Parishes: 18

Information
- Denomination: Catholic Church
- Sui iuris church: Latin Church
- Rite: Roman Rite
- Established: 1845; 181 years ago
- Cathedral: Cathedral of the Immaculate Conception in Nanchang, Jiangxi

Current leadership
- Pope: Leo XIV
- Metropolitan Archbishop: John Baptist Li Suguang
- Auxiliary Bishops: Johannes Peng Weizhao

Map
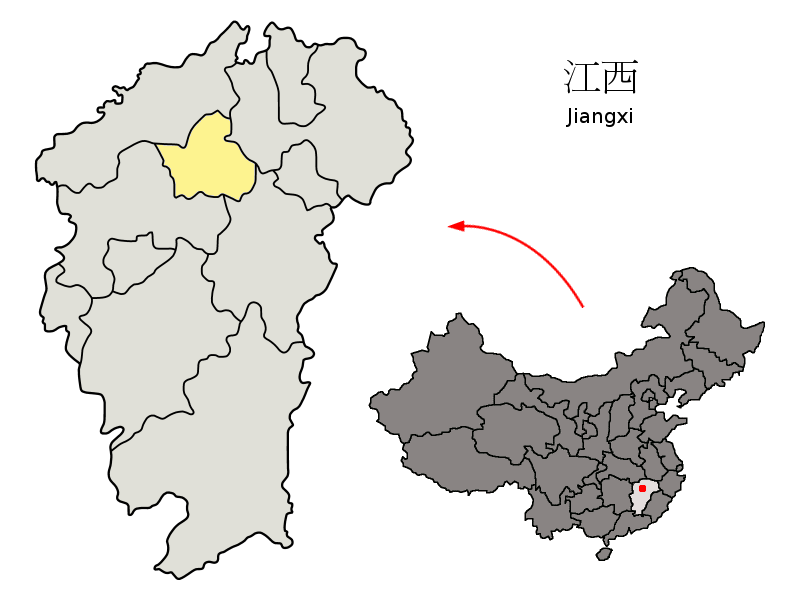

The Roman Catholic Archdiocese of Nanchang (Latin: Nanciamen(sis), Chinese: 南昌) is an archdiocese based in the city of Nanchang in China.

== History ==
- 1696: Established as Apostolic Vicariate of Kiangsi from the Apostolic Vicariate of Chekiang and Kiangsi
- 1838: Suppressed to the Apostolic Vicariate of Chekiang and Kiangsi
- 1846: Restored as Apostolic Vicariate of Kiangsi from the Apostolic Vicariate of Chekiang and Kiangsi
- 19 August 1879: Renamed as Apostolic Vicariate of Northern Kiangsi
- 25 August 1920: Renamed as Apostolic Vicariate of Jiujiang
- 3 December 1924: Renamed as Apostolic Vicariate of Nanchang
- 11 April 1946: Promoted as Metropolitan Archdiocese of Nanchang

== Leadership ==
Archbishops of Nanchang 南昌 (Roman rite)

- John Baptist Li Suguang (李穌光) (25 August 2014 – Present)
- John Wu Shi-zhen (吳仕珍) (21 July 1991 – 25 August 2014)
- Joseph Zhou Ji-shi, C.M. (周濟世) (18 July 1946 – 1972)

Vicars Apostolic of Nanchang 南昌 (Roman Rite)

- Paul-Marie Dumond, C.M. (3 July 1931 – 19 February 1944)
- Louis-Élisée Fatiguet, C.M. (see below 3 December 1924 – 13 February 1931)

Vicar Apostolic of Jiujiang (Roman Rite)

- Louis-Élisée Fatiguet, C.M. (see below 25 August 1920 – 3 December 1924 see above)

Vicars Apostolic of Northern Kiangsi 江西北境 (Roman Rite)

- Louis-Élisée Fatiguet, C.M. (24 February 1911 – 25 August 1920 see above)
- Paul-Léon Ferrant, C.M. (24 September 1905 – 5 November 1910)
- Géraud Bray, C.M. (see below 19 August 1879 – 24 September 1905)

Vicars Apostolic of Kiangsi 江西 (Roman Rite)

- Géraud Bray, C.M. (15 March 1870 – 19 August 1879 see above)
- François-Xavier Danicourt, C.M. (顧方濟) (May 1854 – 2 February 1860)
- Louis-Gabriel Delaplace, C.M. (田嘉璧 / 田類斯) (27 February 1852 – 12 July 1854), appointed Vicar Apostolic of Chekiang
- Bernard-Vincent Laribe, C.M. (14 July 1845 – 20 July 1850)

== Suffragan dioceses ==
- Ganzhou 贛州
- Ji’an 吉安
- Nancheng 南城
- Yujiang 餘江

== Sources ==
- GCatholic.org
- Catholic Hierarchy
