= Archdiocese of Changsha =

Roman Catholic archdiocese in China

Coordinates: 28.2137°N 112.9741°E

Archdiocese of Changsha Archidioecesis Ciamsciavensis 天主教长沙总教区

Location
- Country: China
- Ecclesiastical province: Changsha

Statistics
- Area: 22,820 km^{2} (8,810 sq mi)

Information
- Denomination: Roman Catholic
- Rite: Latin Rite
- Cathedral: Cathedral of the Immaculate Conception in Changsha

Current leadership
- Pope: Leo XIV
- Metropolitan Archbishop: Methodius Qu Ailin

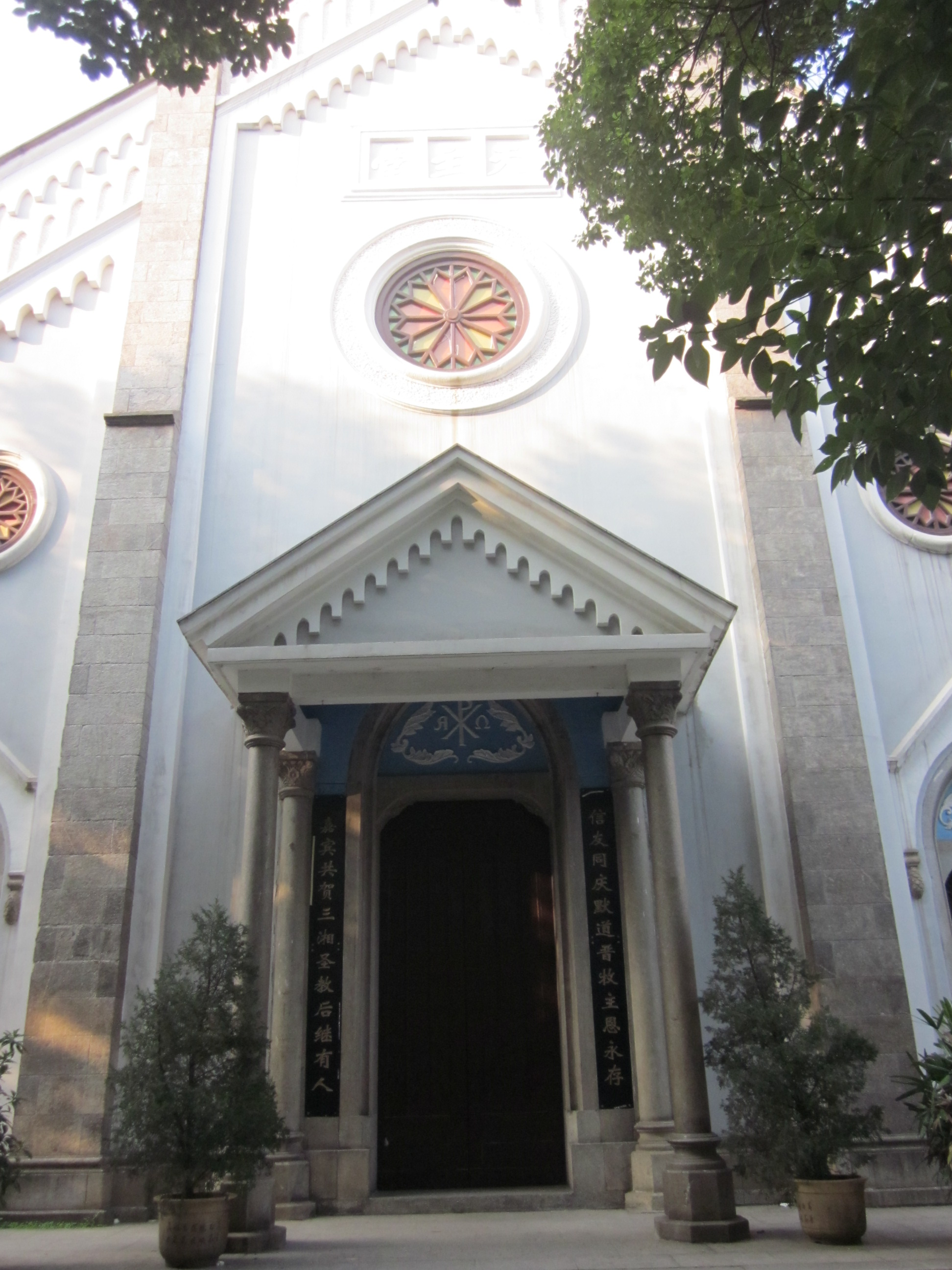
Cathedral of the Immaculate Conception

The Roman Catholic Archdiocese of Changsha (Latin: Ciamsciaven(sis), Chinese: 長沙) is an archdiocese located in the city of Changsha in China.

== History ==
- April 2, 1856: Established as Apostolic Vicariate of Hunan from the Apostolic Vicariate of Hupeh
- September 19, 1879: Renamed as Apostolic Vicariate of Southern Hunan
- December 3, 1924: Renamed as Apostolic Vicariate of Changsha
- April 11, 1946: Promoted as Metropolitan Archdiocese of Changsha

== Leadership ==
- Archbishops of Changsha 長沙 (Roman rite)
  - Archbishop Methodius Qu Ailin (屈藹林) (2012–present)
  - Archbishop Secondino Petronio Lacchio, O.F.M. (April 11, 1946 – February 20, 1976)
- Vicars Apostolic of Changsha 長沙 (Roman Rite)
  - Bishop Secondino Petronio Lacchio, O.F.M. (later Archbishop) (January 12, 1940 – April 11, 1946)
  - Bishop Gaudenzio Giacinto Stanchi, O.F.M. (March 9, 1933 – 1939)
- Vicars Apostolic of Southern Hunan 湖南南境 (Roman Rite)
  - Bishop Noè Giuseppe Tacconi, P.I.M.E. (September 18, 1911 – 1916)
- Vicars Apostolic of Changsha 長沙 (Roman Rite)
  - Bishop Pellegrino Luigi Mondaini, O.F.M. (later Archbishop) (January 13, 1902 – August 11, 1930)
  - Vicars Apostolic of Southern Hunan 湖南南境 (Roman Rite)
  - Saint Bishop Antonio Fantosati, O.F.M. (范懷德) (July 11, 1892 – July 7, 1900)

== Suffragan dioceses ==
- Changde 常德
- Hengzhou 衡州
- Yuanling 沅陵

== See also ==
- Cathedral of the Immaculate Conception (Changsha)

== Sources ==
- GCatholic.org
- Catholic Hierarchy
