= Diocese of Hengzhou =

Roman Catholic diocese in China

Diocese of Hengzhou Dioecesis Hemceuvensis 天主教衡州教区

Location
- Country: China
- Ecclesiastical province: Changsha
- Metropolitan: Changsha

Statistics
- Area: 30,000 km^{2} (12,000 sq mi)
- Population: Total; Catholics: (as of 1950); 3,000,000; 12,085 (0.4%)

Information
- Denomination: Roman Catholic
- Rite: Latin Rite

Current leadership
- Pope: Leo XIV
- Bishop: Sede Vacante
- Metropolitan Archbishop: Methodius Qu Ailin
- Apostolic Administrator: Methodius Qu Ailin

The Roman Catholic Diocese of Hengzhou/Hengchow/Hengyang (Latin: Hemceuven(sis), Chinese: 衡州, 衡陽) is a diocese located in the city of Hengyang (Hunan) in the ecclesiastical province of Changsha in China.

== History ==
- July 23, 1930: Established as Apostolic Vicariate of Hengzhou 衡州 from the Apostolic Vicariate of Changsha 長沙
- April 11, 1946: Promoted as Diocese of Hengzhou 衡州

== Leadership ==
- Bishops of Hengzhou (Roman rite)
  - Bishop Joseph Wan Ci-zhang, O.F.M. (萬次章) (February 14, 1952 – March 1961)
  - Bishop Raffaele Angelo Palazzi, O.F.M. (April 11, 1946 – February 1, 1951)
- Vicars Apostolic of Hengzhou 衡州 (Roman Rite)
  - Bishop Raffaele Angelo Palazzi, O.F.M. (July 23, 1930 – April 11, 1946)
