= Dominic Tang =

Chinese Jesuit priest

His Excellency, The Most Reverend Dominic Tang Yee-ming SJ
- Archbishop of Canton
- Church: Roman Catholic Church
- Province: Canton
- See: Canton
- Predecessor: Antoine-Pierre-Jean Fourquet
- Previous posts: Apostolic Administrator of Canton (1950–1981); Titular Bishop of Elatea (1950–1981)

Orders
- Ordination: 31 May 1941
- Consecration: 13 February 1951 by Gustave-Joseph Deswazières

Personal details
- Born: 13 May 1908 British Hong Kong
- Died: 27 June 1995 (aged 87) Stamford, Connecticut, United States
- Buried: Santa Clara Mission Cemetery, Santa Clara, California, United States
- Denomination: Roman Catholic
- Motto: Ut omnes unum sint (English: That they all may be one)
- Coat of arms: Dominic Tang Yee-ming's coat of arms

Ordination history of Dominic Tang
History
Priestly ordination
- Date: 31 May 1941
- Place: Shanghai, Republic of China
Episcopal consecration
- Consecrated by: Gustave-Joseph Deswazières (Pakhoi)
- Date: 13 February 1951
- Place: Canton, China
Episcopal succession
Bishops consecrated by Dominic Tang as principal consecrator
- Andrew Tsien Chih-ch'un: 11 April 1992

Styles of Dominic Tang Yee-ming
- Reference style: His Excellency; The Most Reverend
- Spoken style: Your Excellency
- Religious style: Bishop

Dominic Tang Yee-ming SJ (simplified Chinese: 邓以明; traditional Chinese: 鄧以明; pinyin: Dèng Yǐmíng; Jyutping: dang6 ji5 ming4; May 13, 1908 – June 27, 1995) was a Chinese Jesuit priest. Appointed Bishop in 1951 and later archbishop of Canton, he spent twenty-two years in jail for his loyalty to the Catholic Church and died in exile in the United States.

== Jesuit and Bishop ==
Tang was born in 1908 in Hong Kong and decided to enter the Jesuit novitiate in Spain in August 1930. Back in China, he studied Catholicism in Shanghai. Tang was ordained a priest in 1941. After his ordination he worked as a parish priest, principal of a primary school and did social welfare work in the Ecclesiastical Province of Guangzhou. Pope Pius XII appointed him on 1 October 1950 as Apostolic Administrator of Canton (Guangzhou), and on 13 February 1951 he was ordained titular bishop of Elateia by Bishop Gustave Deswaziere, who said of him: "By accepting the appointment from the Holy See in these difficult times, the new bishop was showing absolute obedience and a spirit of sacrifice."

== Imprisonment ==
Tang was arrested in 1958. The People's Republic of China charged him as "the most faithful running-dog of the reactionary Vatican". He remained in jail for 22 years in Laogai prison because he refused to sever contact with the Pope, as the government ordered him to.

In 1987, he released his book How Inscrutable His Ways! In it he summarized his attitudes while incarcerated for 22 years:

- "In prison, I always asked God to grant me the grace to progress in virtue., e.g. humility and obedience....I obeyed only the regulations which did not conflict with the principles of my faith. I want to be gentle and kind to others, without resisting ill-treatment from others; when controlled and walked on, I did not complain. There are many opportunities for practicing virtue in prison."
- "When I was a seminarian, I learned to do God's will. God's will required me to practice virtue in prison. This was God's love for me."

His sudden release (on June 2, 1980) was due to a developing cancer, he then was given permission to leave the People's Republic of China for a cancer operation in Hong Kong.

== Later years ==
In 1980, the Guangzhou Chinese Catholic Patriotic Association affirmed Tang's status as bishop.

Later in 1980, Tang met with Agostino Casaroli in Hong Kong, as part of an effort by the Holy See and the People's Republic of China to improve relations. At the time, both the Vatican and the China viewed Tang favorably.

In May 1981, at the age of 73, he was appointed Archbishop of Canton (Guangzhou). The Chinese government contended that his appointment as Archbishop went against the principles of the patriotic church's independence. On 22 June 1981, China's Religious Affairs Bureau removed him from his position as an authorized bishop.

Tang was not permitted to return to China. After spending several years in Hong Kong, he went to the United States. He died in Stamford, Connecticut at the age of 87 and was buried at Mission Santa Clara de Asís in Santa Clara, California.

Catholic Church titles
Vacant Title last held by Adolphe Rayssac	Apostolic Administrator of Canton; 1950–1981	Succeeded by None (title dormant)
Vacant Title last held by Antoine-Pierre-Jean Fourquet	Archbishop of Canton; 1981–1995	Succeeded by Lin Bingliang
Preceded by John Christopher Cody	— TITULAR — Bishop of Elatea; 1950–1981	Vacant
