= Diocese of Jiaying =

Roman Catholic diocese in China

Coordinates: 24°19′N 116°07′E

Diocese of Jiaying Dioecesis Chiaïmensis 天主教嘉应教区

Location
- Country: China
- Ecclesiastical province: Guangzhou
- Metropolitan: Guangzhou

Statistics
- Area: 67,000 km^{2} (26,000 sq mi)
- Population: Total; Catholics: (as of 1950); 2,625,000; 22,819 (0.9%)

Information
- Rite: Latin Rite
- Cathedral: Cathedral of the Holy Family in Meizhou

Current leadership
- Bishop: Joseph Liao Hong-qing
- Metropolitan Archbishop: Joseph Gan Junqiu

The Roman Catholic Diocese of Jiaying/Kayíng/Meizhou (Latin: Chiaïmen(sis), Chinese: 嘉應, 梅縣) is a diocese of the Catholic Church which is headquartered in the city of Meizhou, in the ecclesiastical province of Guangzhou in China.

== History ==
- February 20, 1929: Established as the Apostolic Prefecture of Jiaying 嘉應 from the Apostolic Vicariate of Shantou 汕頭
- June 18, 1935: Promoted as Apostolic Vicariate of Jiaying 嘉應
- April 11, 1946: Promoted as Diocese of Jiaying 嘉應

== Leadership ==
- Bishops of Jiaying 嘉應 (Roman rite)
  - Bishop Francis Xavier Ford, M.M. (April 11, 1946 – February 21, 1952)
- Vicars Apostolic of Jiaying 嘉應 (Roman Rite)
  - Bishop Francis Xavier Ford, M.M. (June 18, 1935 – April 11, 1946)
- Prefects Apostolic of Jiaying 嘉應 (Roman Rite)
  - The Rev. Francis Xavier Ford, M.M. (April 28, 1929 – June 18, 1935)
