= Peter Zhuang Jianjian =

Chinese Roman Catholic bishop (born 1931)

The Most Reverend Peter Zhuang Jianjian
- Bishop Emeritus of Shantou
- Church: Catholic Church
- Diocese: Shantou
- Appointed: 18 September 2006
- Term ended: 22 January 2019
- Predecessor: John Cai Tiyuan
- Successor: Joseph Huang Bingzhang

Orders
- Ordination: 21 December 1986
- Consecration: 18 September 2006

Personal details
- Born: 1931 (age 94–95) Jiexi County, Guangdong, China
- Denomination: Roman Catholic

Peter Zhuang Jianjian (Chinese: 莊建堅; born 1931) is a Chinese Roman Catholic prelate who served as Bishop of the Diocese of Shantou from 2006 until his retirement in 2019. He was ordained a priest in 1986 and later consecrated a bishop with the approval of the Holy See but was not recognized as a bishop by the government of the People's Republic of China. He became bishop emeritus in 2019 following negotiations between the Vatican and Chinese authorities.

== Early life and priesthood ==
Peter Zhuang Jianjian was born in 1931 in Jiexi County, Guangdong Province, China. He pursued his religious formation during a period when the Catholic Church in China faced severe restrictions, particularly during the Cultural Revolution. After completing studies at the Sheshan Seminary in Shanghai, he was ordained a priest on 21 December 1986 at the Basilica of Our Lady of Sheshan.

== Episcopal ministry ==
Zhuang was consecrated a bishop on 18 September 2006 with the approval of the Holy See, becoming Bishop of Shantou. However, the Chinese government did not recognize his episcopal status and regarded him as an underground bishop.

Under the provisional Sino-Vatican agreement on the appointment of bishops, the Holy See later sought for Zhuang to retire in favor of another prelate, Joseph Huang Bingzhang. Reports in 2018 described Vatican representatives meeting him to request his retirement, which he initially resisted.

On 22 January 2019 he officially became bishop emeritus of Shantou and was succeeded by Huang.

== Later life ==
As bishop emeritus, Zhuang has remained active in pastoral life. In 2025, Agenzia Fides reported that religious sisters from the Diocese of Shantou visited the 94-year-old prelate in Hepo parish, acknowledging his long episcopal service.
