= Archdiocese of Guangzhou =

Latin Catholic archdiocese in China

Archdiocese of Guangzhou (Canton) Archidioecesis Cantonensis 天主教广州总教区
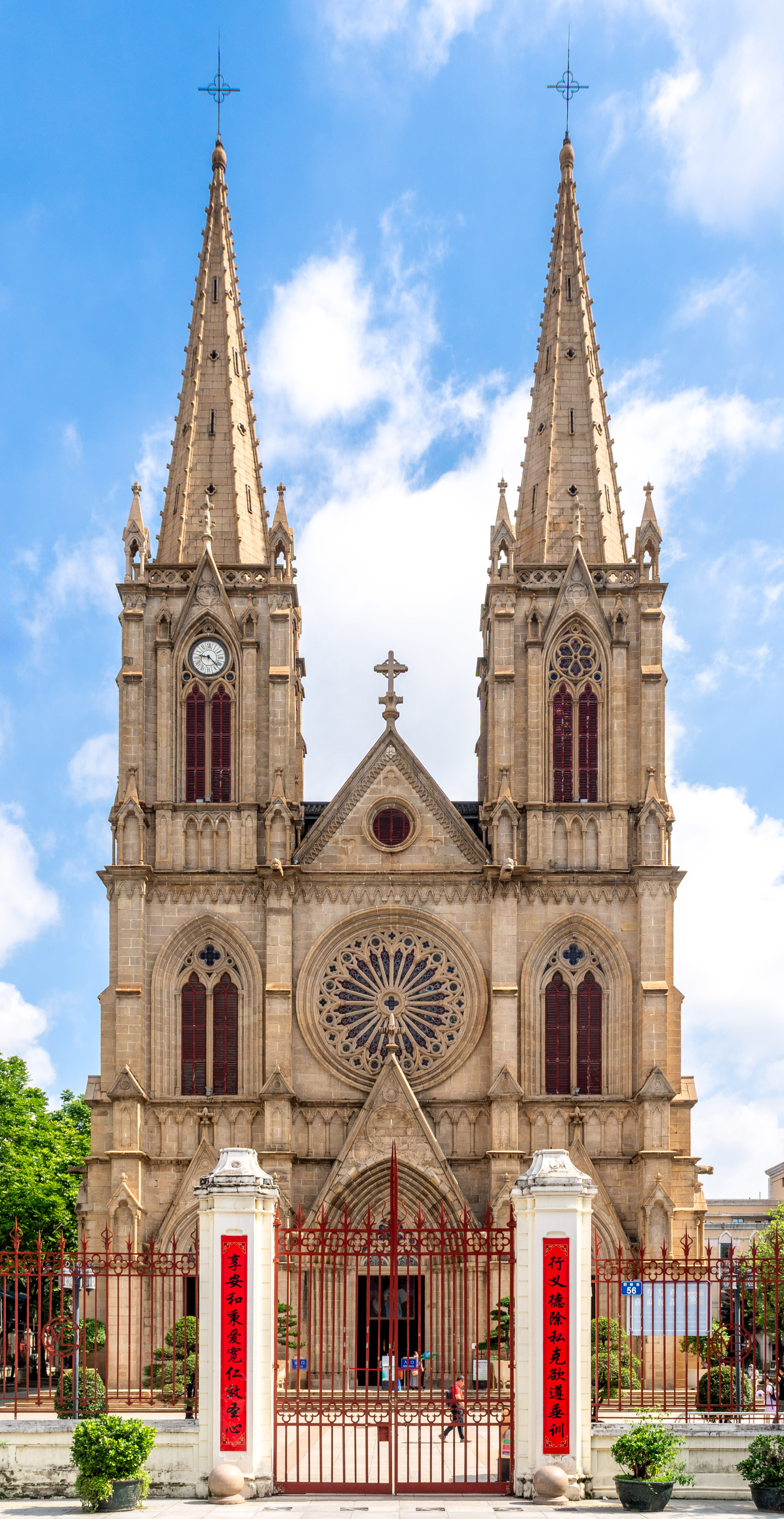
- Sacred Heart Cathedral

Location
- Country: China
- Ecclesiastical province: Guangzhou
- Coordinates: 23°7′2″N 113°15′17″E

Statistics
- Area: 43,332 km^{2} (16,731 sq mi)
- Population: Total; Catholics: (as of 1949); 4,800,000; 20,346 (0.4%)

Information
- Denomination: Catholic
- Rite: Latin Rite
- Cathedral: Cathedral of the Sacred Heart in Guangzhou

Current leadership
- Pope: Leo XIV
- Metropolitan Archbishop: Joseph Gan Junqiu

Map
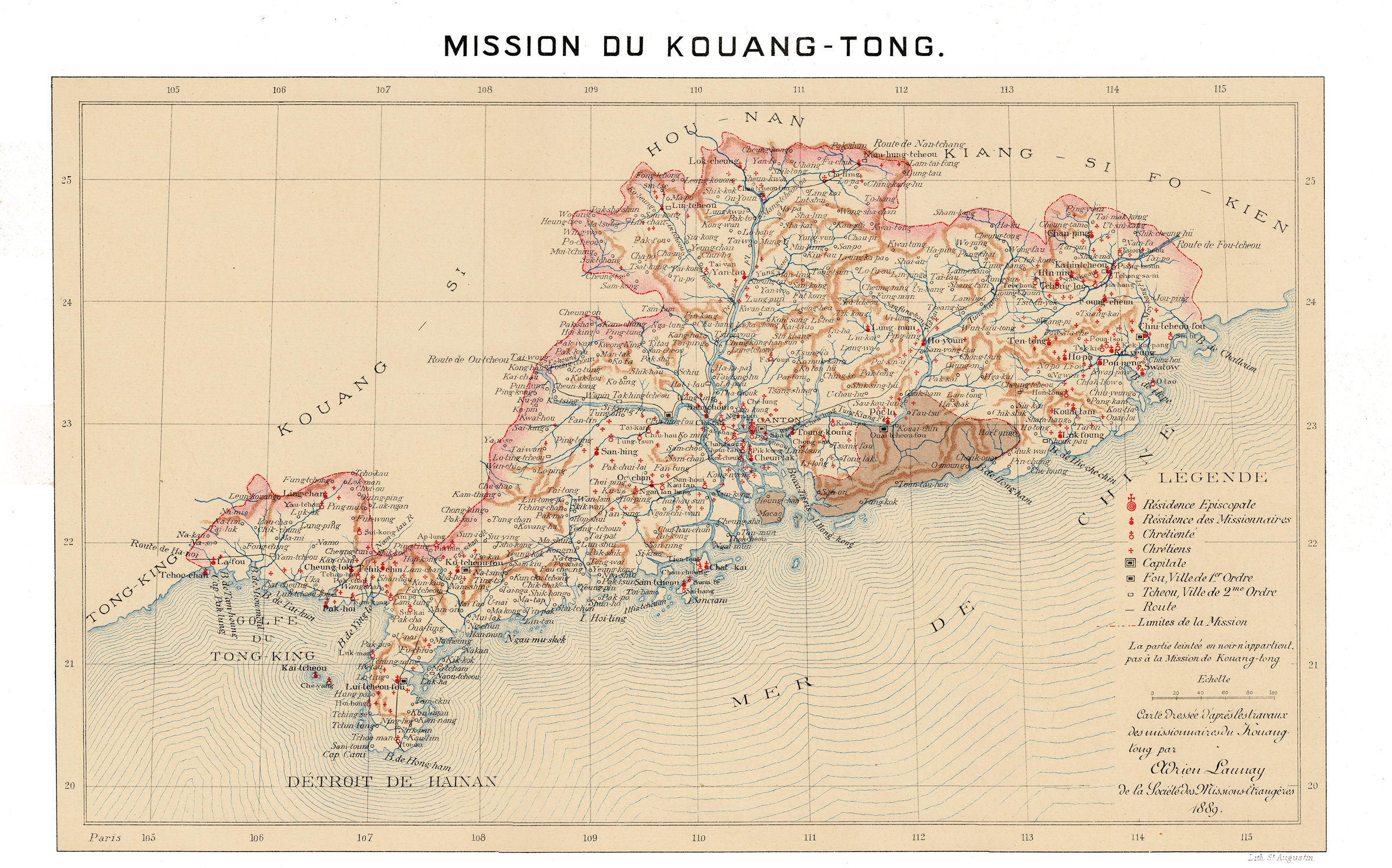
- Map of Kwangtung (or Canton) Mission, prepared by Adrien Launay, 1889.

Archdiocese of Guangzhou
- Traditional Chinese: 天主教廣州總教區
- Simplified Chinese: 天主教广州总教区
Transcriptions
Standard Mandarin
- Hanyu Pinyin: tiān zhǔ jiào Guǎngzhōu zǒng jiàoqū
- Wade–Giles: T'iēnchǔchiào Kuǎngchōu tsǔng chiàoch'ǘ
- Yale Romanization: tyān jǔ jyàu Gwǎngjōu dzǔng jyàuchyū
Yue: Cantonese
- Jyutping: Tin1zyu2gaau3 Gwong2zau1 Zung2gaau3keoi1

The Archdiocese of Guangzhou (Canton) (Latin: Archidioecesis Cantonensis, Chinese: 天主教廣州總教區) is an archdiocese located in the city of Guangzhou in China.

== History ==
- 1848: Established as Apostolic Vicariate of Guangdong-Guangxi from the Diocese of Macau
- 1875: Renamed as Apostolic Vicariate of Guangdong
- April 6, 1914: Renamed as Apostolic Vicariate of Guangzhou
- April 11, 1946: Promoted as Metropolitan Archdiocese of Guangzhou

The Apostolic Administrator of the Archdiocese of Guangzhou Bishop Dominic Deng Yi-ming, S.j. was imprisoned in 1958. His release in 1981 due to a necessary cancer treatment in Hong Kong and his subsequent appointment to archbishop caused the Chinese authorities respond with the appointment of Joseph Ye Yinyun. Archbishop Ye was never recognised by the Holy See, his successor Archbishop James Lin Bingliang was recognised in 1998 only after Archbishop Deng's death in 1995. Thus the rift between the underground church and the Patriotic Church came for the Archdiocese to an end. The present archbishop Joseph Gan Junqiu won papal consent even before the consent of the Chinese authorities. His ordination was delayed, because the Chinese authorities originally wanted to have two illicit bishops preside over it.

== Leadership ==
- Archbishops of Guangzhou (Roman rite)
  - Archbishop Joseph Gan Junqiu (甘俊邱, consecration on Dec 4, 2007, after prior papal approval)
  - Archbishop James Lin Bingliang (林秉良, 1990-2001, papal approval in 1998).
  - Archbishop Joseph Ye Yinyun (叶荫芸, 1981-1990, without papal approval)
  - Archbishop Dominic Deng Yi-ming (Tang Yee-ming), S.J. (鄧以明) (May 26, 1981 – June 27, 1995, after 1981 in exile)
  - Bishop Dominic Deng Yi-ming (Tang Yee-ming), S.J. (鄧以明) (later Archbishop) (Apostolic Administrator October 1, 1950 – May 26, 1981)
  - Archbishop Antoine-Pierre-Jean Fourquet, M.E.P. (April 11, 1946 – December 11, 1947)
- Vicars Apostolic of Guangzhou 廣州 (Roman Rite)
  - Bishop Antoine-Pierre-Jean Fourquet, M.E.P. (later Archbishop) (February 20, 1923 – April 11, 1946)
  - Bishop Jean-Baptiste-Marie Budes de Guébriant, M.E.P. (later Archbishop) (April 28, 1916 – March 21, 1921)
  - Bishop Adolphe Rayssac, M.E.P. (Apostolic Administrator 1915 – 1916)
  - Bishop Jean-Marie Mérel, M.E.P. (April 6, 1914 – August 6, 1914)
- Vicars Apostolic of Guangdong 廣東 (Roman Rite)
  - Bishop Jean-Marie Mérel, M.E.P. (April 20, 1901 – April 6, 1914)
  - Bishop Augustin Chausse, M.E.P. (April 5, 1886 – October 12, 1900)
  - Bishop Philippe François Zéphirin Guillemin, M.E.P. (November 16, 1853 – April 5, 1886)

== Suffragan dioceses ==
- Beihai
- Hong Kong (de jure)
- Jiangmen
- Jiaying
- Shantou
- Shaozhou

== Catholic churches ==
There are several catholic churches in Guangzhou city. Few of them are offering masses in foreign languages regularly.

Guangzhou City

- Sacred Heart Cathedral of Guangzhou
  - Address: No. 56, Yide Road, Guangzhou (一德路56号).
  - English mass: every Sunday 03:30 pm.
- Shamian Church of Our Lady of Lourdes
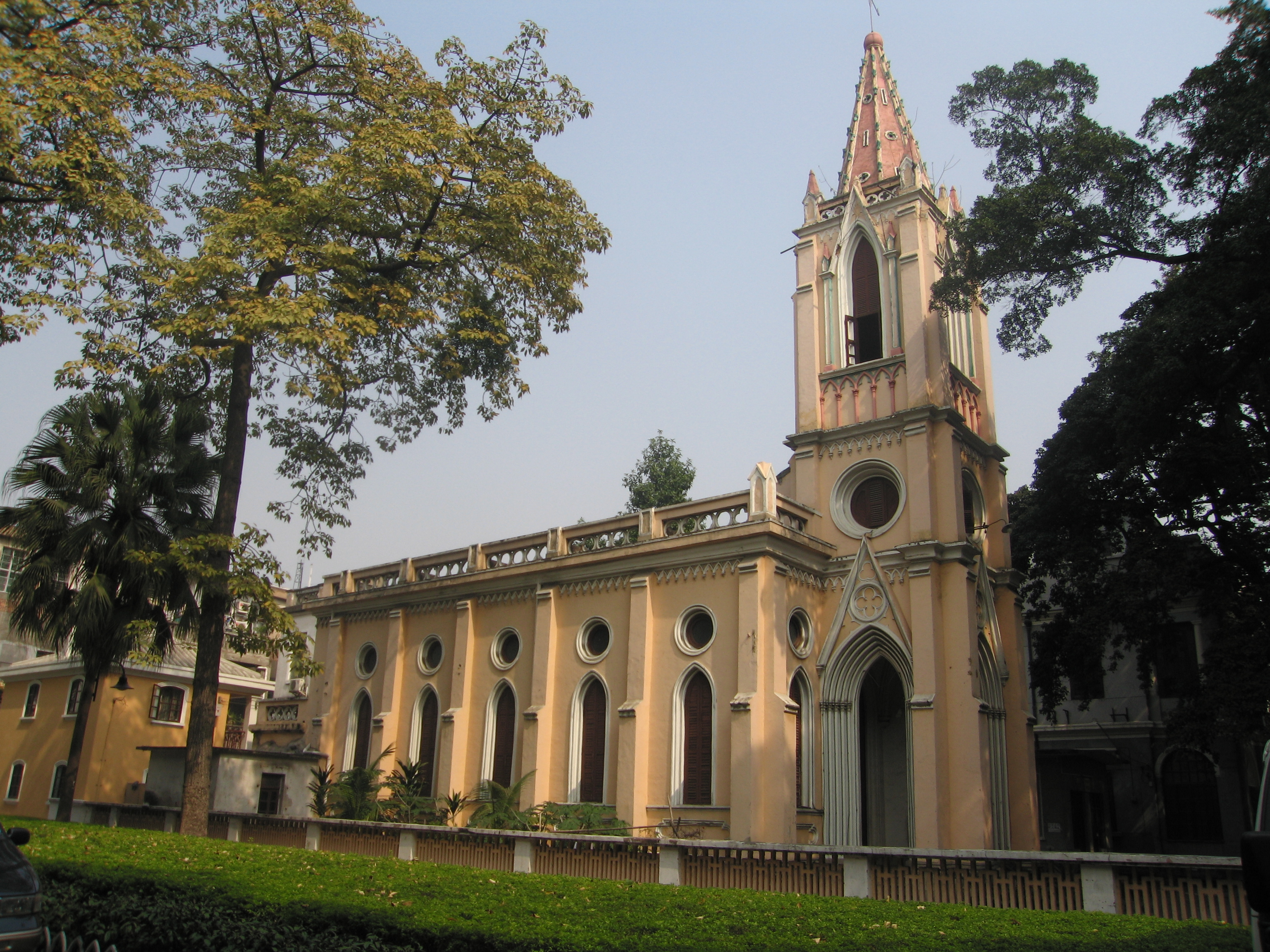
  Our Lady of Lourdes Chapel on Shamian Island
  - Address: No. 14, Shamian Avenue, Shamian, Guangzhou.
  - English mass: every Sunday at 11:00 am.
- St. Francis of Assisi Chapel
  - Address: No. 26, Shanhehou Street, Yuexiu District, Guangzhou (广州市越秀区山河后街26号)
  - English mass: every Sunday at 10:00 am.

== See also ==
- Sacred Heart Cathedral of Guangzhou
- Christianity in China
- Catholicism in China
- Chinese Patriotic Catholic Association
- List of Catholic dioceses in China
- Episcopal Conference of China
