= Saint Joseph's Cathedral (Shantou) =

Cathedral in Guangdong, China

Coordinates: 23°21′31″N 116°40′31″E

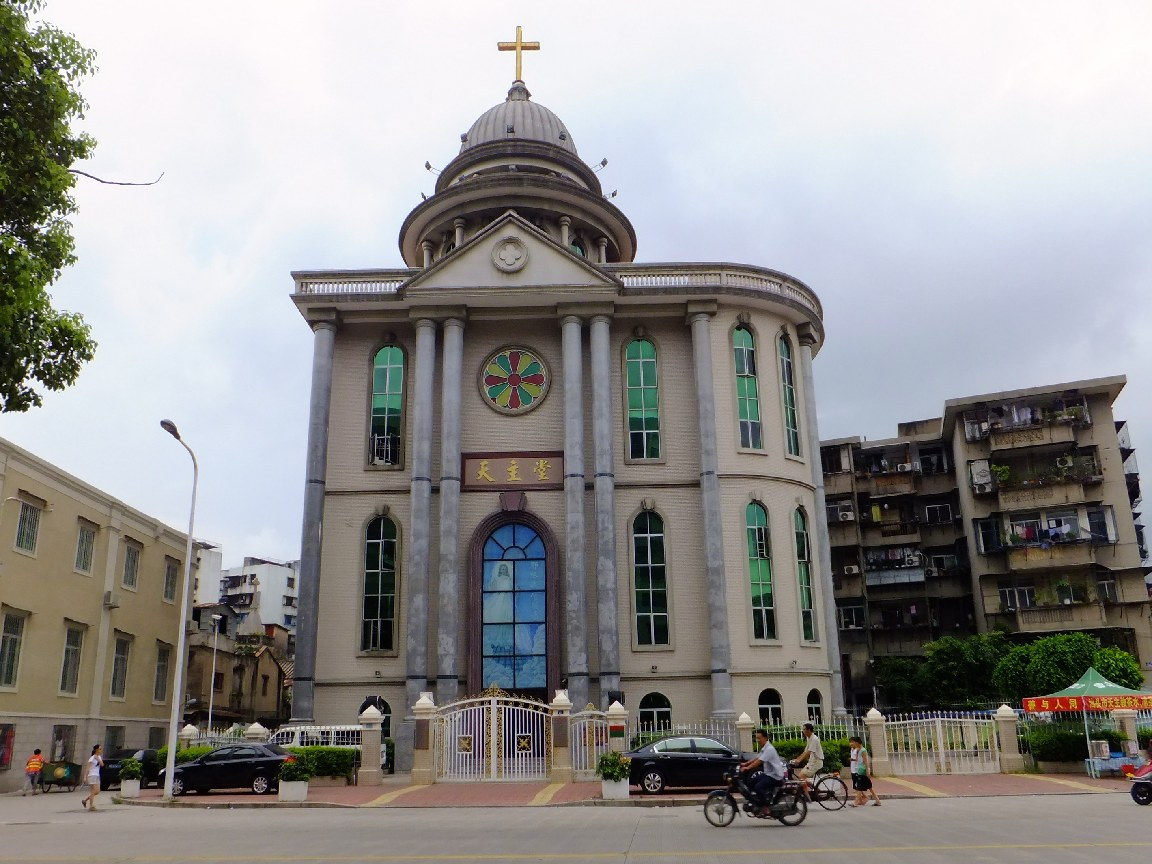
Saint Joseph's Cathedral along Waima Road, Shantou.

St. Joseph's Cathedral is the cathedral of the Roman Catholic Diocese of Shantou, located at 133 Waima Road, Shantou, Guangdong, China.

== History ==
Catholic missionaries from the Paris Foreign Missions Society first entered Shantou in 1870. In 1908, the 400 square metre St. Joseph's Cathedral was built. It was a single-storey building with partial choir loft.

During the Cultural Revolution, religious activities ceased at the cathedral, and it was used as a factory. Because of the resulting damage, it was rebuilt in 1984 at the original site.

The current cathedral building was rebuilt and reopened on 12 December 1999. The current building stands on a site of over 800 square metres, with a floor area of about 4000 square metres. The first floor is a parking garage, the second is a hall, the third is the sanctuary, the fourth and fifth are a U-shaped service hall, sixth and seventh are clock tower with Roman-style dome. The total height is almost 38 metres, and there is seating for over 2000 within.
