= Callistus Caravario =

Catholic Martyr in China

Saint Callistus Caravario S.D.B
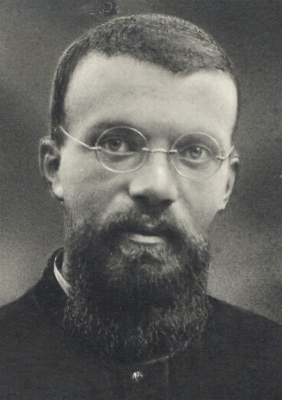

Martyr
- Born: 18 June 1903; Cuorgnè, Italy
- Died: 25 February 1930 (aged 26); Shaoguan, China
- Venerated in: Roman Catholic Church
- Beatified: 15 May 1983, Saint Peter's Square, Vatican City by Pope John Paul II
- Canonized: 1 October 2000, Saint Peter's Square, Vatican City by Pope John Paul II
- Feast: 25 February

Callistus Caravario (18 June 1903 ― 25 February 1930) was a Salesian priest serving in China, who along with Luigi Versiglia was martyred in China on 25 February 1930.

== Early life ==
Caravario was born in Cuorgnè, Italy on 18 June 1903. He joined Salesians on the advice of Father Garelli and entered the Novitiate.

== Mission in China ==
Callistus was inspired by the words of Bishop Luigi Versiglia who spoke of the missions to the Brothers on his visit to Turin in 1922 and wanted to join the mission in China. After a prolonged insisting to join the mission in China finally he was sent to China. He was sent to Macao and then he spent two years in Timor. He returned to Shaoguan on 18 May 1929 and was ordained a priest by Versiglia. He was entrusted with the mission at Lianzhou.

== Martyrdom ==
On 13 February 1930, Caravario was accompanying Versiglia on his pastoral visit to his mission in Lianzhou and there were some young boys and girls with them. Their boat was stopped by a group of Bolshevik pirates on 25 February 1930, the pirates wanted to take the girls. Versiglia and Callistus tried to stop them but they were hit by the guns by the pirates and fell unconscious. Versiglia and Callistus were taken ashore and shot by the pirates. Their bodies were found on 27 February 1930.

== Sainthood ==
Caravario was declared a martyr by Pope Paul VI in 1976 and was beatified by Pope John Paul II in 1983. He was canonized on 1 October 2000 along with Luigi Versiglia by John Paul II.
