= Luigi Versiglia =

20th-century Roman Catholic martyr

Saint Luigi Versiglia S.D.B.
- Apostolic Vicar of Shaoguan
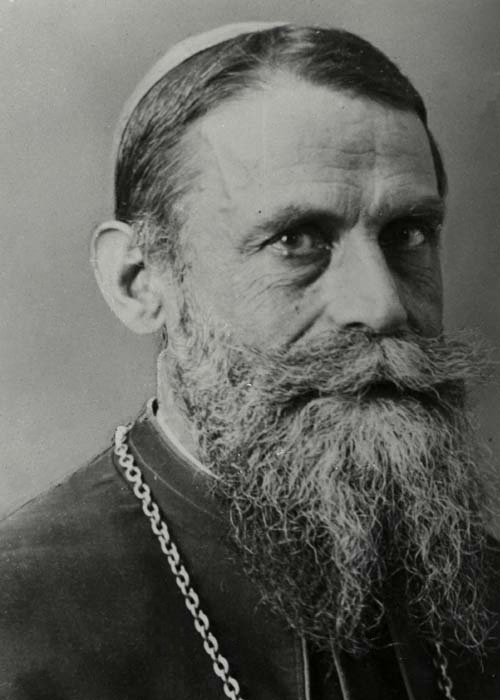
- Photograph circa 1921.
- Church: Catholic Church
- See: Shaoguan
- Appointed: 22 April 1920
- Term ended: 25 February 1930
- Predecessor: None; position established
- Successor: Ignazio Canazei
- Other post: Titular Bishop of Carystus (1920–30)

Orders
- Ordination: 21 December 1895
- Consecration: 9 January 1921 by Jean-Baptiste-Marie Budes de Guébriant
- Rank: Bishop

Personal details
- Born: Luigi Versiglia; 5 June 1873 Oliva Gessi, Pavia, Kingdom of Italy
- Died: 25 February 1930 (aged 56) Litouzui, Guangdong, China
- Education: Pontifical Gregorian University

Sainthood
- Feast day: 25 February; 13 November (Salesians)
- Venerated in: Catholic Church
- Beatified: 15 May 1983; Saint Peter's Square, Vatican City by Pope John Paul II
- Canonized: 1 October 2000; Saint Peter's Square, Vatican City by Pope John Paul II
- Attributes: Episcopal attire; Palm; Chalice

Luigi Versiglia, S.D.B. (5 June 1873 – 25 February 1930) was an Italian Catholic prelate and professed member from the Salesians of Don Bosco who served as the first apostolic vicar of Shaoguan from 1920 until his murder. He was also a former novice master noted for his strict austerities and discipline but for his loving and compassionate care of the poor and defenceless. He led the first Salesian expedition to China in 1906 and remained there until his death, functioning for the people in various capacities such as a gardener and barber.

His beatification was celebrated in 1983 and he was later canonized as a saint on 1 October 2000 in Saint Peter's Square.

== Life ==
Luigi Versiglia was born on 5 June 1873 in Oliva Gessi in Pavia. He served as an altar server in his childhood. In 1885 his parents sent him to school at one of the oratories that the Salesians of Don Bosco managed though he never entertained notions of becoming a priest instead of a veterinarian as he wished. He studied there in Valdocco from 1885 to 1889 before deciding to become a Salesian himself. But Don Bosco also noticed Versiglia's diligence and saw something in him that he wanted to discuss with the child. He told him that he wanted to meet with him soon to tell him important. This happened in 1887 though the actual meeting never took place for Bosco fell ill and died in 1888. Versiglia wondered from that point what it was Bosco wished to speak with him about.

He entered the order after Michele Rua received him into it. He made his solemn profession on 11 October 1889 and he received his doctorate in philosophical studies from the Gregorian in Rome in 1893 (he was there since 1890). His ordination to the priesthood was celebrated on 21 December 1895 and he was later appointed as novice master at Genzano in Rome from 1896 until 1905 where he became known for his strict austerities and discipline. But Versiglia needed to receive a special dispensation to be ordained since he was under the canonical age requirement.

He led the first expedition for Salesian missionaries into China in 1906 and arrived at Macau on 7 January. The priest began his work and established a motherhouse for the order at Macau while opening a new mission in the Shaoguan region where Pope Benedict XV appointed him as its first apostolic vicar in 1920. Versiglia received his episcopal consecration in 1921 at the Canton Cathedral where the Salesian Servant of God Carlo Braga was stationed at the organ for the event. He founded an orphanage as well as several aged care homes and two leper colonies. But he tended to the needs of his people and served in various capacities for them such as their gardener or barber.

He and Callisto Caravario – fellow Salesian whom he knew well – were travelling at noon on 25 February 1930 via boat along a river to the Lin-Chow mission when Bolshevik pirates boarded their ship. The pirates planned on abducting and enslaving three girls on the ship but the two priest shielded them. But the pirates managed to subdue the pair and knocked them unconscious after striking them with their rifle butts before binding them and going to rummage through their possessions in their luggage. The men discarded the crucifixes as the men came to with the two hearing each other's confession. The pair were then dragged ashore into a thicket where Versiglia knew he would die so pleaded for the men to spare Caravario. But the retort came: "No" because "the foreign devils must all die". Five rifle shots ended the pair's lives. Their remains were not discovered until 27 February and the girls captured were released within the week.

His remains were interred at the Lin Kong-How Cathedral but the Red Guards vandalized this place during the Cultural Revolution.

On 2 October 2010 the Salesian cardinal Joseph Zen Ze-kiun led a torchlight commemoration to the pair on 2 October 2010 to mark a decade since the pair were canonized as saints.

== Canonization ==
The process for the pair's canonization opened in both Shaozhou and in Turin in an informative process that spanned from 31 December 1934 until its closure in 1935. Versiglia's spiritual writings received theological approval on 18 March 1949. The formal introduction to the cause came on 13 June 1952 under Pope Pius XII, and he became titled as a Servant of God. There was also a second process that was held but split into two: one was held in Hong Kong from 1953 to 1954 and the other was held in Turin from 1953 to 1957. Both processes received validation from the Congregation for Rites on 5 July 1963 when the cause moved to Rome for further investigation.

The officials from the Congregation for the Causes of Saints and their consultants approved the cause on 3 February 1976 with the C.C.S. members alone meeting and approving the cause on 11 May 1976. Pope Paul VI approved their beatification on 13 November 1976 determining that the two were killed "in odium fidei" (in hatred of the faith) but died in 1978 before he could celebrate their beatification as did his successor Pope John Paul I a month later. Pope John Paul II celebrated the beatification on 15 May 1983.

Their canonization would have depended on one miracle being attributed to them but this was waivered. Their cause was unified to that of others killed in China on 11 January 2000 with John Paul II signing a decree "de signis" on 22 January 2000 which waivered the required miracle for canonization. The date for the celebration was determined at a gathering of cardinals held on 10 March 2000 and Versiglia – and that of 119 others – was canonized as a saint in Saint Peter's Square on 1 October 2000.
