= Philippe François Zéphirin Guillemin =

Philippe François Zéphirin Guillemin MEP
- Vicar Apostolic of Guangdong
- Church: Catholic Church
- See: Apostolic Vicariate of Guangdong
- In office: 16 November 1853 – 5 April 1886
- Predecessor: Napoléon François Libois
- Successor: Augustin Chausse
- Other post: Titular Bishop of Cybistra (1856-1886)

Orders
- Ordination: 8 September 1839
- Consecration: 25 January 1857 by Pope Pius IX

Personal details
- Born: 16 March 1814 Vuillafans, Doubs, French Empire
- Died: 5 April 1886 (aged 72) Besançon, Doubs, France

Philippe François Zéphyrin Guillemin (Chinese: 明稽章) (March 16, 1814 - April 5, 1886) was a Roman Catholic bishop.

He was born in Vuillafans, Doubs, France.

He was appointed titular bishop of Cybistra in 1856 and was ordained bishop in 1857.

He was the first vicar apostolic of Guangdong from November 16, 1853, to April 5, 1886.

He oversaw the construction project of the Sacred Heart Cathedral of Guangzhou, although he did not see its completion, since he died two years before.

He died in Besançon.

== Works ==
- Guillemin, Philippe François Zéphirin (1870). Lettres sur l'erection de la chapelle de S. François Xavier dans l'île de Sancian et autres faits récents de la mission (in French). Rome: Imprimerie de la Propagande, P. Marietti.
