= Vuillafans =

- Commune
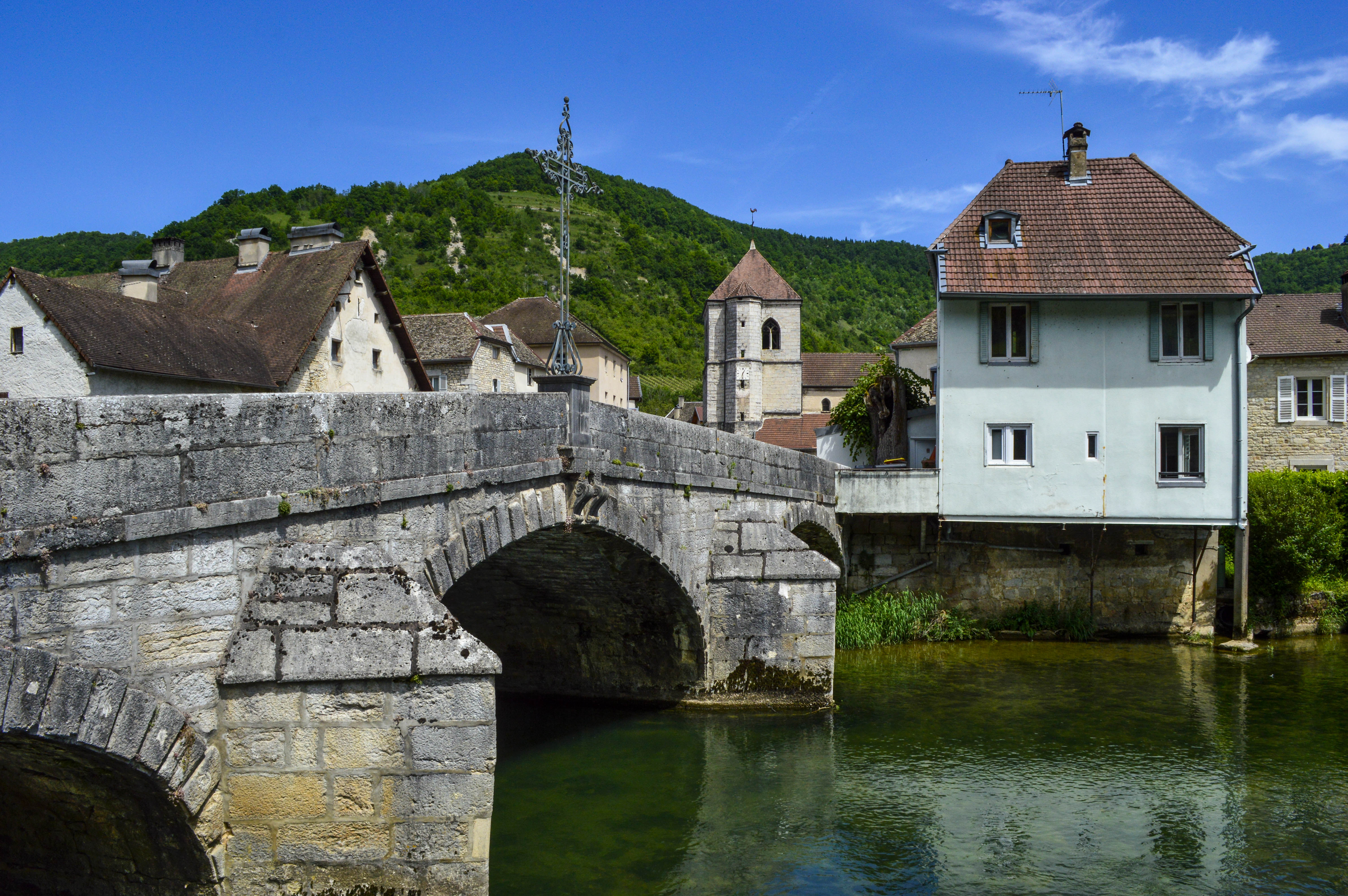
- The village on the banks of the Loue

- Coat of arms
- Location of Vuillafans
- Location within France Location within Bourgogne-Franche-Comté
- Coordinates: 47°03′57″N 6°13′02″E
- Country: France
- Region: Bourgogne-Franche-Comté
- Department: Doubs
- Arrondissement: Besançon
- Canton: Ornans
- Intercommunality: Loue-Lison

Government
  - Mayor (2020–2026): Claude Curie
- Area^{1}: 6.14 km^{2} (2.37 sq mi)
- Highest elevation: 721 m (2,365 ft)
- Lowest elevation: 339 m (1,112 ft)
- Population (2023): 669
  - Density: 109/km^{2} (282/sq mi)
- Time zone: UTC+01:00 (CET)
  - Summer (DST): UTC+02:00 (CEST)
- INSEE/Postal code: 25633 /25840
- ^{1} French Land Register data, which excludes lakes, ponds, glaciers > 1 km^{2} (0.386 sq mi or 247 acres) and river estuaries.

Vuillafans (french pronunciation [vijafɑ̃]) is a commune in the Doubs department in the Bourgogne-Franche-Comté region in eastern France.

== Personalities ==
It was the birthplace of Balthasar Gérard, the assassin of the Dutch independence leader, William I of Orange, also known as William the Silent. Gérard was born at number 3 in the street now called Rue Gérard.

== Population ==
Historical population
Year	Pop.	±% p.a.
1968	764	—
1975	773	+0.17%
1982	600	−3.55%
1990	649	+0.99%
1999	668	+0.32%
2007	713	+0.82%
2012	688	−0.71%
2017	757	+1.93%
2023	669	−2.04%
Source: INSEE

== See also ==
- Communes of the Doubs department
- Philippe François Zéphirin Guillemin (1814-1886), Roman Catholic bishop, was born in Vuillafans
