= Sacred Heart Cathedral (Guangzhou) =

Catholic cathedral in Guangzhou, China

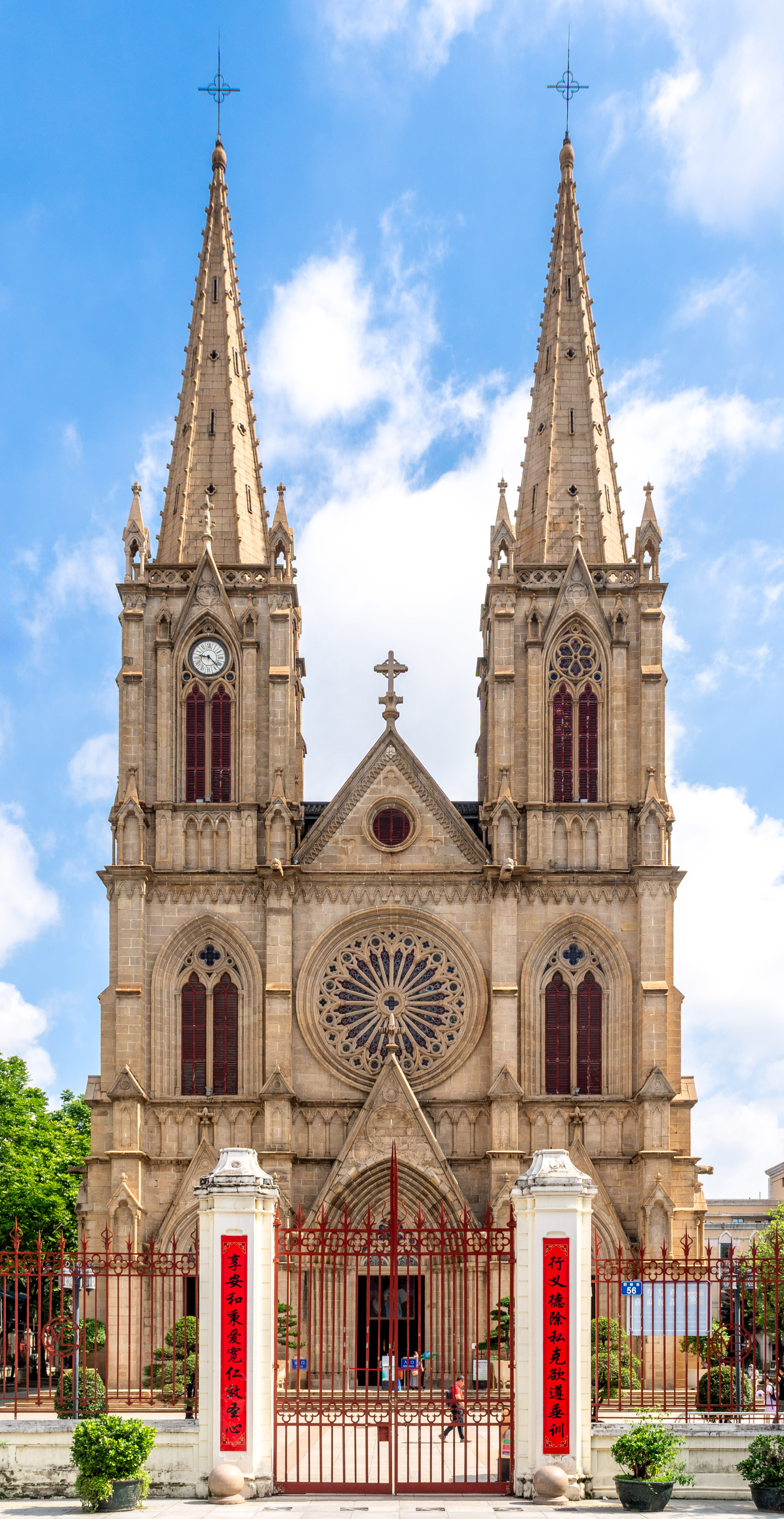
- The southern front façade
- Sacred Heart Cathedral
- 23°7′2.34″N 113°15′17.4″E
- Address: 56 Yide Road
- Country: China

Architecture
- Groundbreaking: June 28, 1861

Chinese name
- Traditional Chinese: 耶穌聖心主教座堂
- Simplified Chinese: 耶稣圣心主教座堂
- Literal meaning: Jesus's Sacred Heart Cathedral
Transcriptions
Standard Mandarin
- Hanyu Pinyin: Yēsū Shèngxīn Zhǔjiàozuòtáng
Yue: Cantonese
- Jyutping: je4 sou1 sing3 sam1 zyu2 gaau3 zo6 tong4

The Stone House
- Chinese: 石室
- Literal meaning: Stone Room
Transcriptions
Standard Mandarin
- Hanyu Pinyin: Shíshì
Yue: Cantonese
- Jyutping: sek6 sat1

The Sacred Heart Cathedral, properly the Cathedral of the Sacred Heart of Jesus and also known as the Stone Chamber or Stone House by locals, (Note: Southern Metropolis Daily, cited at Life of Guangzhou.) is a Gothic Revival Roman Catholic cathedral in Guangzhou, China. It is the seat of the Archbishop of Guangzhou. The cathedral is located at 56 Yide Road (一德路56号), on the north bank of the Pearl River at the heart of the old district. It is one of the few cathedrals in the world to be entirely built of granite, including all the walls, pillars, and the twin towers.

== History ==
The site of the cathedral was originally the residence of the Viceroy of Guangdong and Guangxi Provinces in the Qing dynasty. During the Second Opium War, the residence was completely destroyed and Viceroy Ye Mingchen was captured by the British.

Based on the terms of an imperial edict issued by the Daoguang Emperor in February 1846, which promised compensation for churches destroyed and properties taken from the mission, the Société des Missions Étrangères de Paris obtained the site by signing an agreement with the Qing government on January 25, 1861. In his decree of approval, the Xianfeng Emperor wrote "from now on, war should be stopped and peace be sincerely kept forever".

With financial support from Napoleon III and donations from French Catholics, Bishop Philippe François Zéphirin Guillemin, M.E.P. (明稽章), the first vicar apostolic of Guangdong, oversaw the construction project. A French architect from Nancy, Léon Vautrin, was asked to design the cathedral, in collaboration with Charles Hyacinthe Humbert, also from Nancy. Humbert and another architect from Paris, Antoine Hermitte, who succeeds him at a later time, both travelled to China to oversee the construction of the cathedral. Bishop Guillemin did not get to see completion of the cathedral, as he died at the age of 72 in Paris in 1886, two years before the cathedral was finished. The construction was supervised by his successor, Bishop Augustin Chausse, M.E.P. (邵斯).

== Construction ==
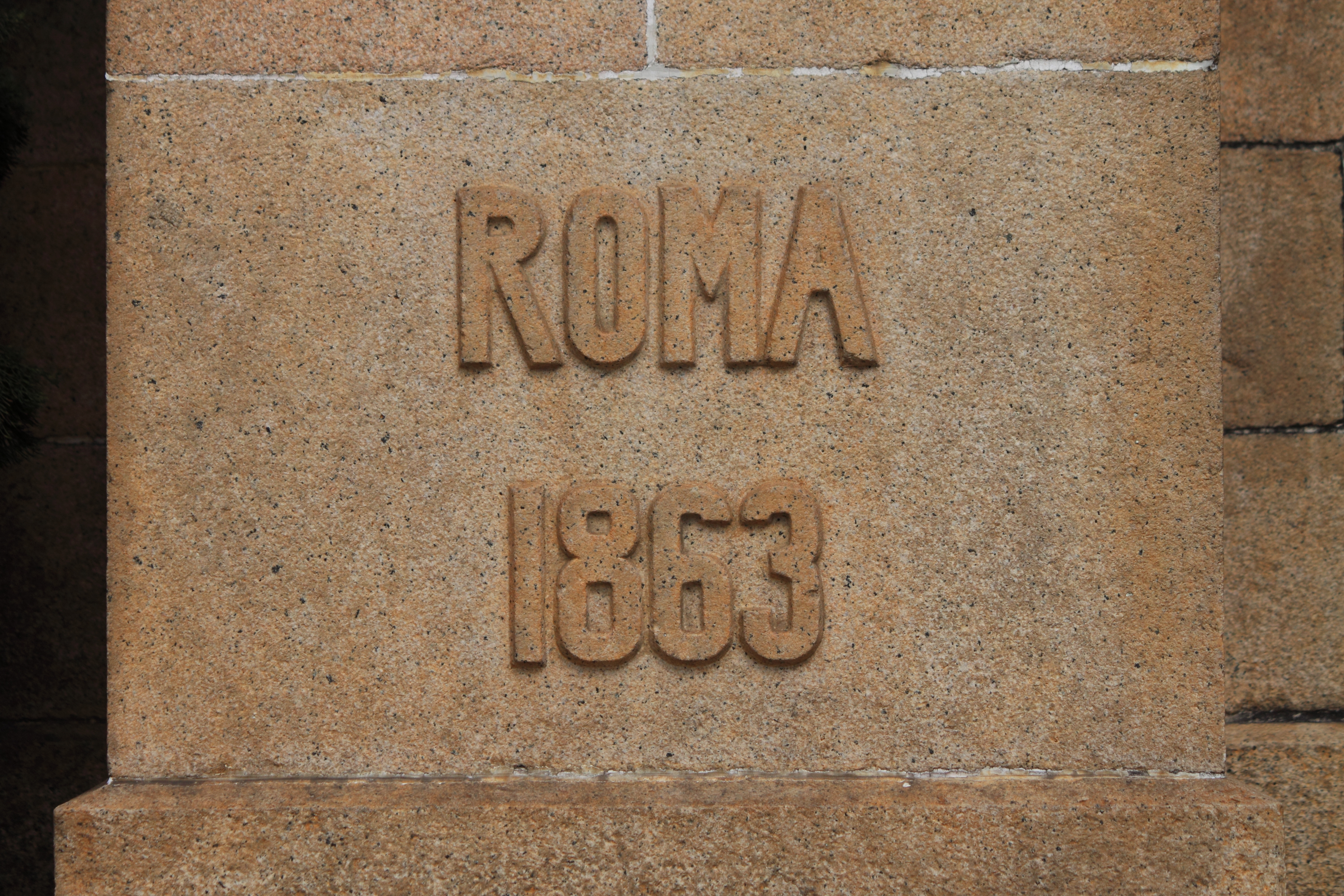
"Roma 1863"

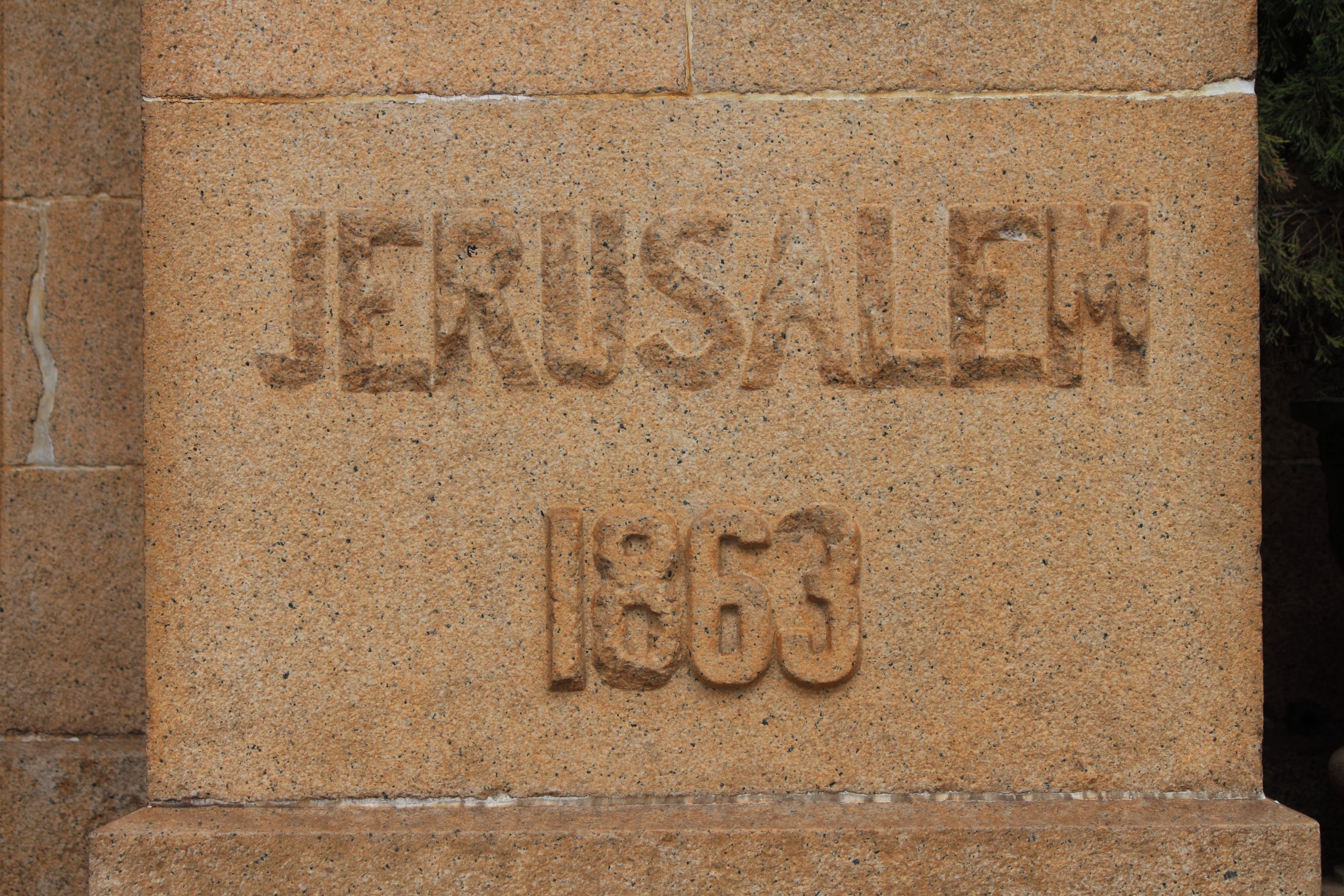
"Jerusalem 1863"

Construction of the foundation began on June 28, 1861, the Feast of the Sacred Heart, and concluded in 1863. On December 8, the Feast of the Immaculate Conception, with surrounding Chinese houses and streets decorated, a grand ceremony was held, attended by the Viceroy of Liangguang, all senior Mandarins, a detachment of 300 Manchu troops, all consuls in Canton as well as the missionaries and a score of priests. The bishop and the consul of France, Baron Gilbert de Trenqualye, delivered speeches. Two foundation stones were blessed and laid. The words "Jerusalem 1863" were engraved on the east one and "Roma 1863" on the west one, in reference to the Catholic Church's origin in Jerusalem in the east and headed on Earth by the Pope in Rome in the west. One kilogram of soil taken from Rome and one stone from Jerusalem were laid under the respective foundation stones.

The construction of the cathedral turned out to be very challenging, mostly because of its all-granite structure and the lack of machinery, which meant the cathedral had to be built by hand. None of the Chinese workers at that time had seen a western cathedral before, not to mention had any experience of building one. Communication was another major problem when the French and the Chinese didn't speak each other's languages. The construction progress was slow for the first few years. Eventually the French employed a Chinese man named Cai Xiao (蔡孝) from Jiexi County as foreman. Cai had many years of experience in building stone houses in his hometown, which enabled him to bring in a lot of unique and creative methods. He barely left the site since being employed. The construction of the cathedral took most of his youth but was able to be finished in his lifetime.

The cathedral was mostly funded by Napoleon III. When bishop Guillemin met him in Paris in 1858, the emperor, urged by his wife Eugénie, offered a personal grant of 500,000 francs. In 1873, a bill was passed in the National Assembly of France with 491 ayes against 100 nays, allocating another 75,000 francs to the Ministry of Foreign Affairs to be used on the cathedral.

The cathedral was finished in 1888 after 25 years of construction.

== Architecture ==
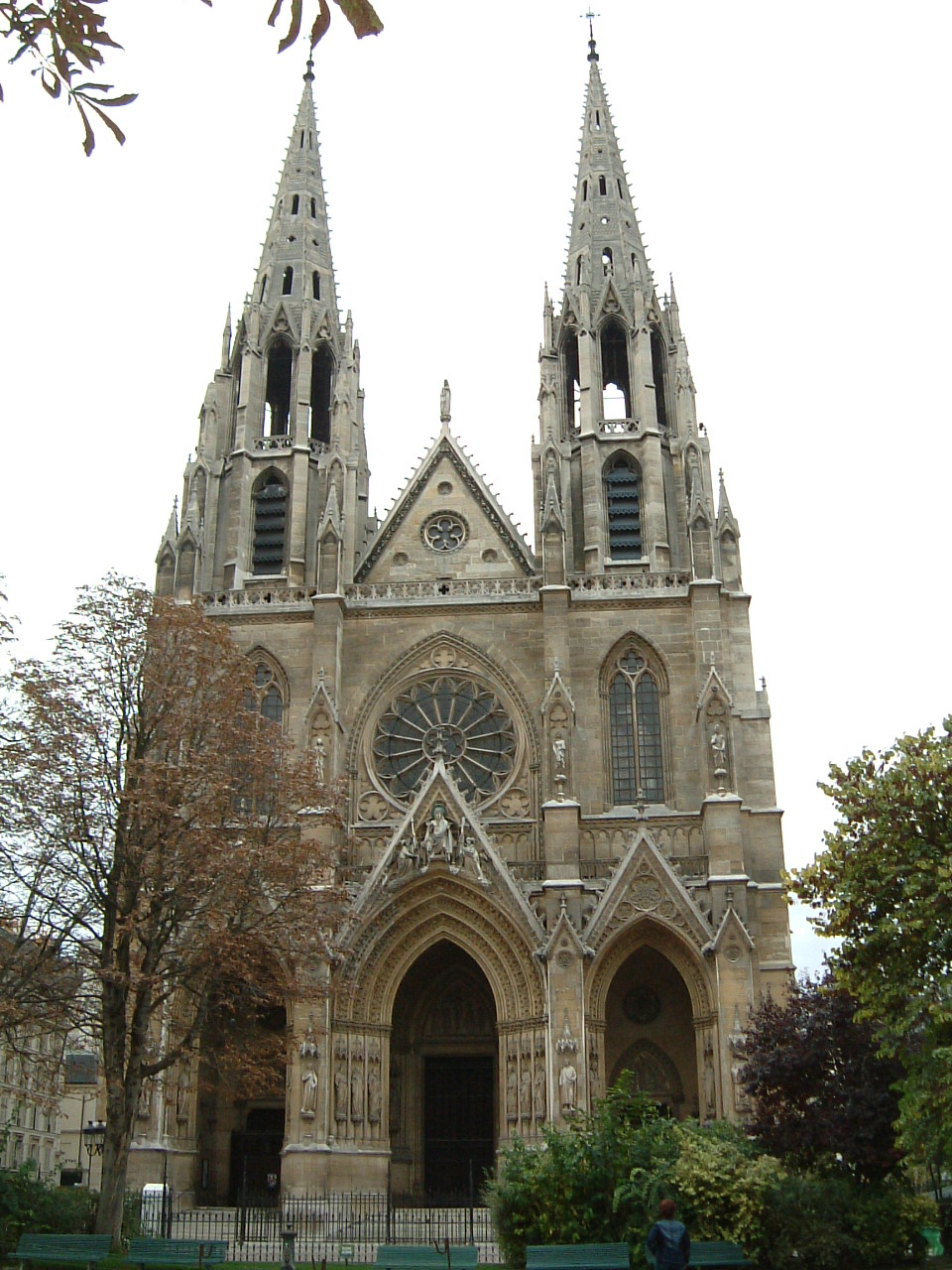
St Clotilde, Paris

The façade of the cathedral was modelled on the Basilica of St. Clotilde in Paris and its nave and apse were inspired by the Toul Cathedral. The cathedral features a nave of 28.2 metres high, flanked by two lower aisles and 14 small side-chapels. With a floor area of 2,924 square metres, it is the largest Roman Catholic church in the Guangzhou archdiocese and the largest cathedral in the Gothic style in China and Southeast Asia. The cathedral is 32.85 metres wide, 77.17 metres long, and the twin towers rise 52.76 metres high. The west tower is a clock tower while the east tower serves as a bell tower, inside which there used to be five large bells shipped in from France in the 19th century, although nowadays only four remain as one was given to a local church in Guangxi province in the early 1980s.

The cathedral, like most of the great Gothic cathedrals of Europe, is built of solid masonry. It is one of the few churches in the world to be entirely built of granite, including all the walls, pillars and the twin towers. The stones were extracted from the quarries of the Four hills of Kowloon and were transported from Kowloon, Hong Kong by sailing ships.

== Repairs ==
Since its completion in 1888, the cathedral has undergone three major repairs. The first time was in the 1920s and 1930s, when then Bishop Antoine-Pierre-Jean Fourquet, M.E.P. (魏暢茂), replaced the timber roof, beams and steel staircases with concrete ones. A second repair took place after the Cultural Revolution in the 1980s. Recently between 2004 and 2006 the largest repair works were carried out. The church paid ¥3 million and local Catholics donated about ¥2 million for the ¥26 million project, while the rest was covered by the local government. The aim of the restoration was to solve the problem of leakage by rebuilding the whole roof, which was the most challenging task as the rib vault below needed to remain untouched and intact. Most of 19th century stained glass was damaged during wartime and smashed in the Cultural Revolution, so new stained glass was ordered from a Philippine company specialising in church glass. It resulted in the new stained glass carrying English descriptions instead of Latin and French texts of the original French glass. New lighting, audio and CCTV systems were also installed. The original French mechanical clock has long gone, so a new 750,000-yuan clock tailored for the clock tower was ordered from a Chinese clock factory.

== Mass times ==
- Weekdays: 06:45 (Cantonese)
- Saturday: 06:45 (Cantonese), 16:00 (Korean), 19:30 (Mandarin)
- Sunday: 07:00 (Cantonese), 08:30 (Cantonese), 10:30 (Mandarin), 15:30 (English)

== Gallery ==
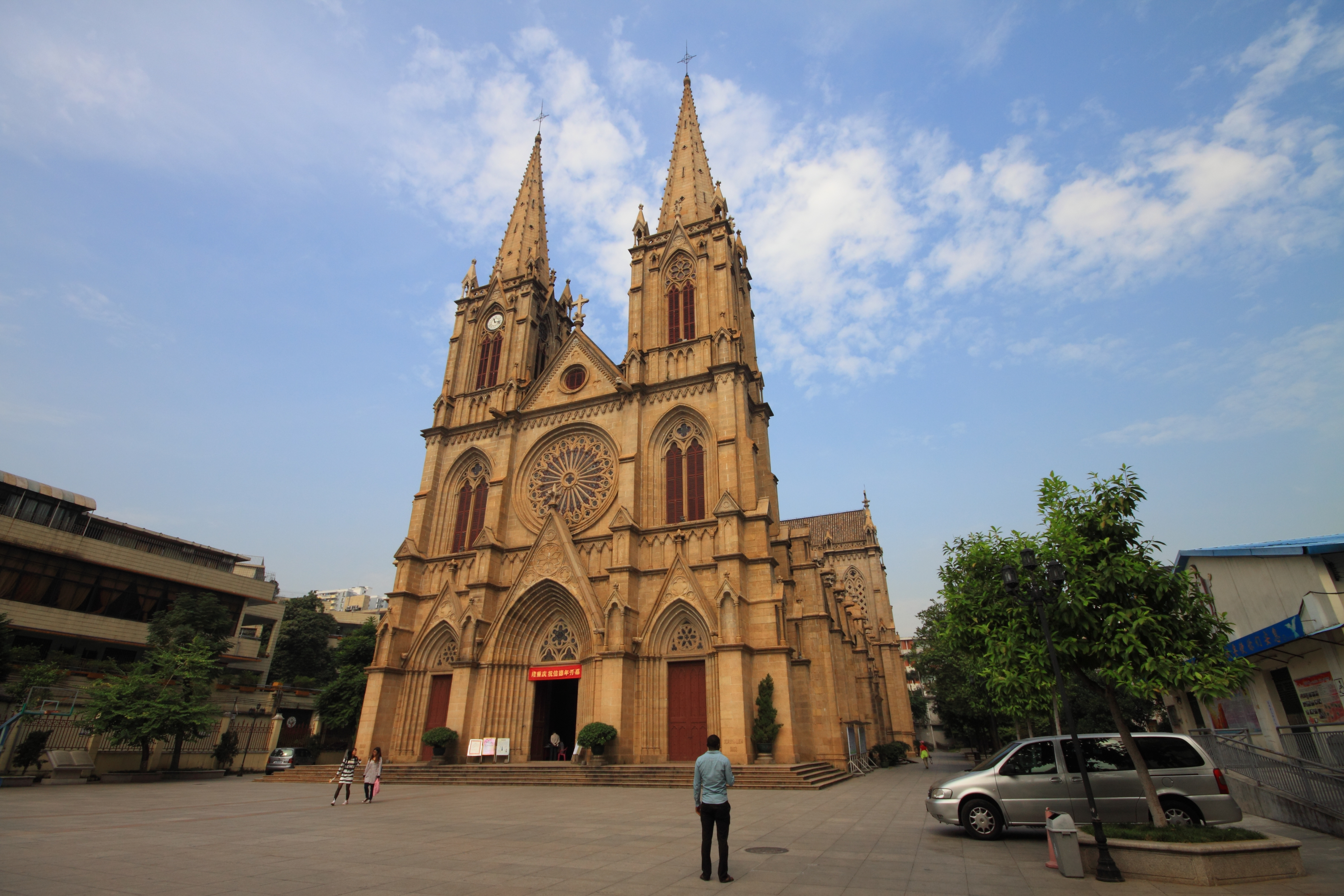

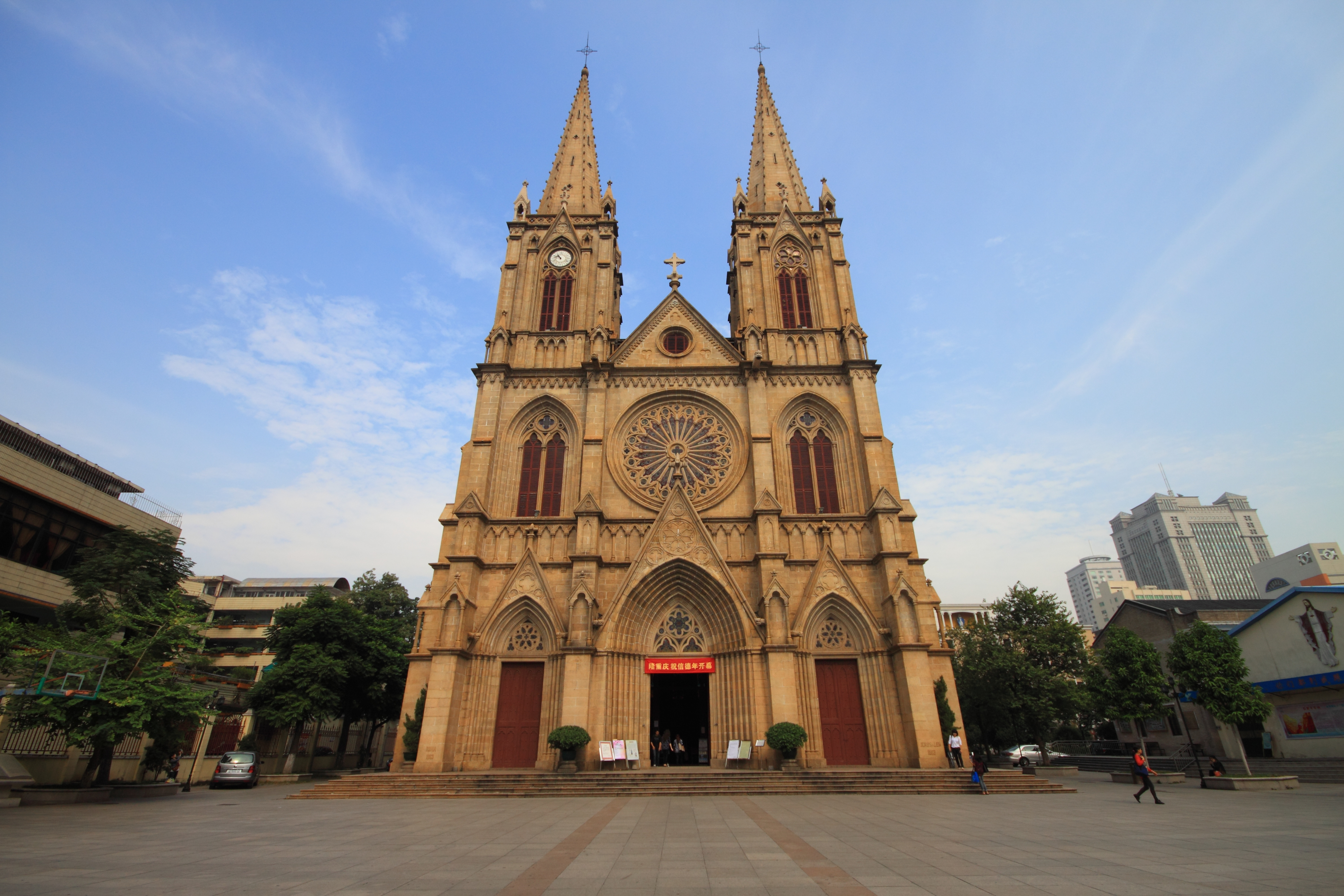

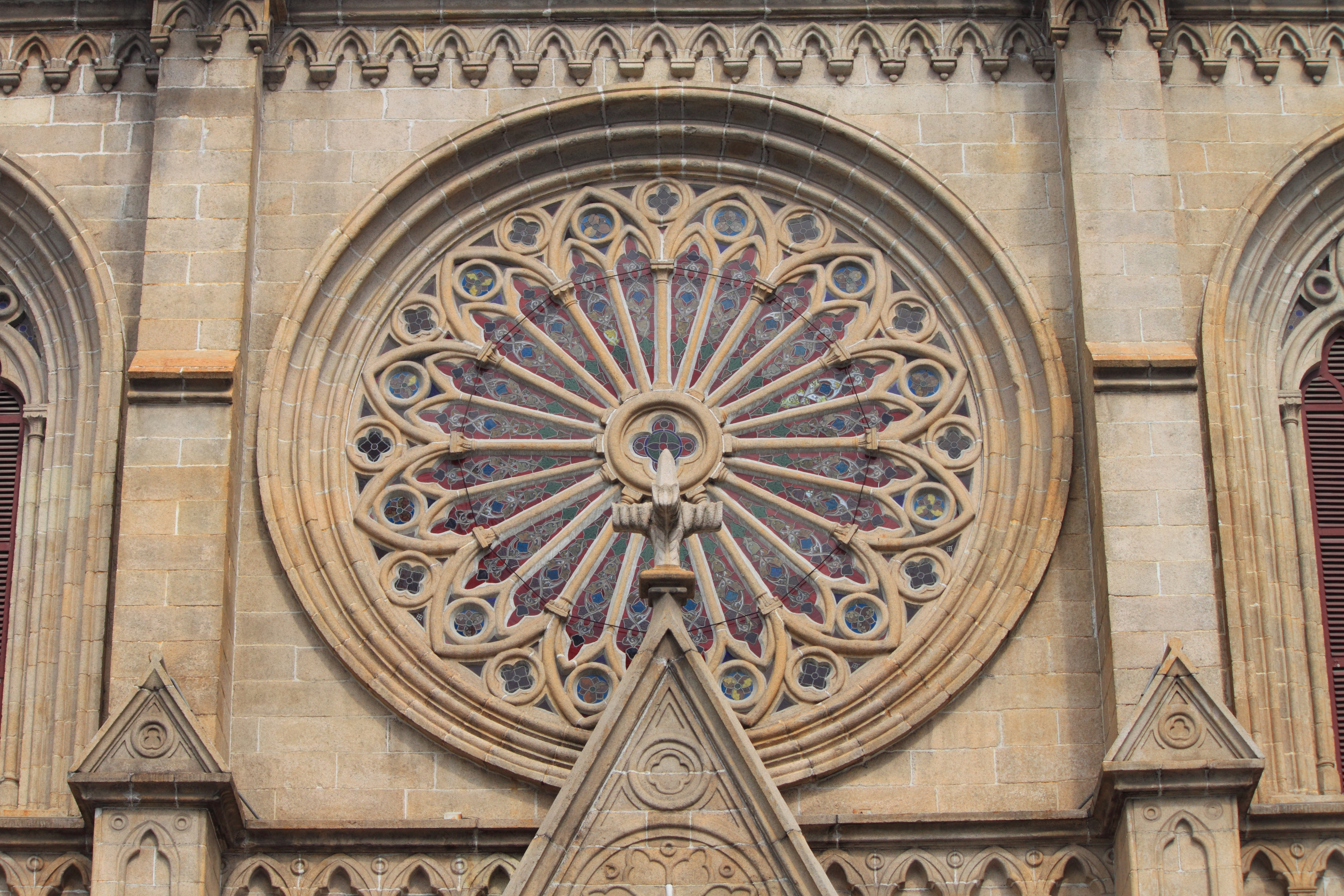

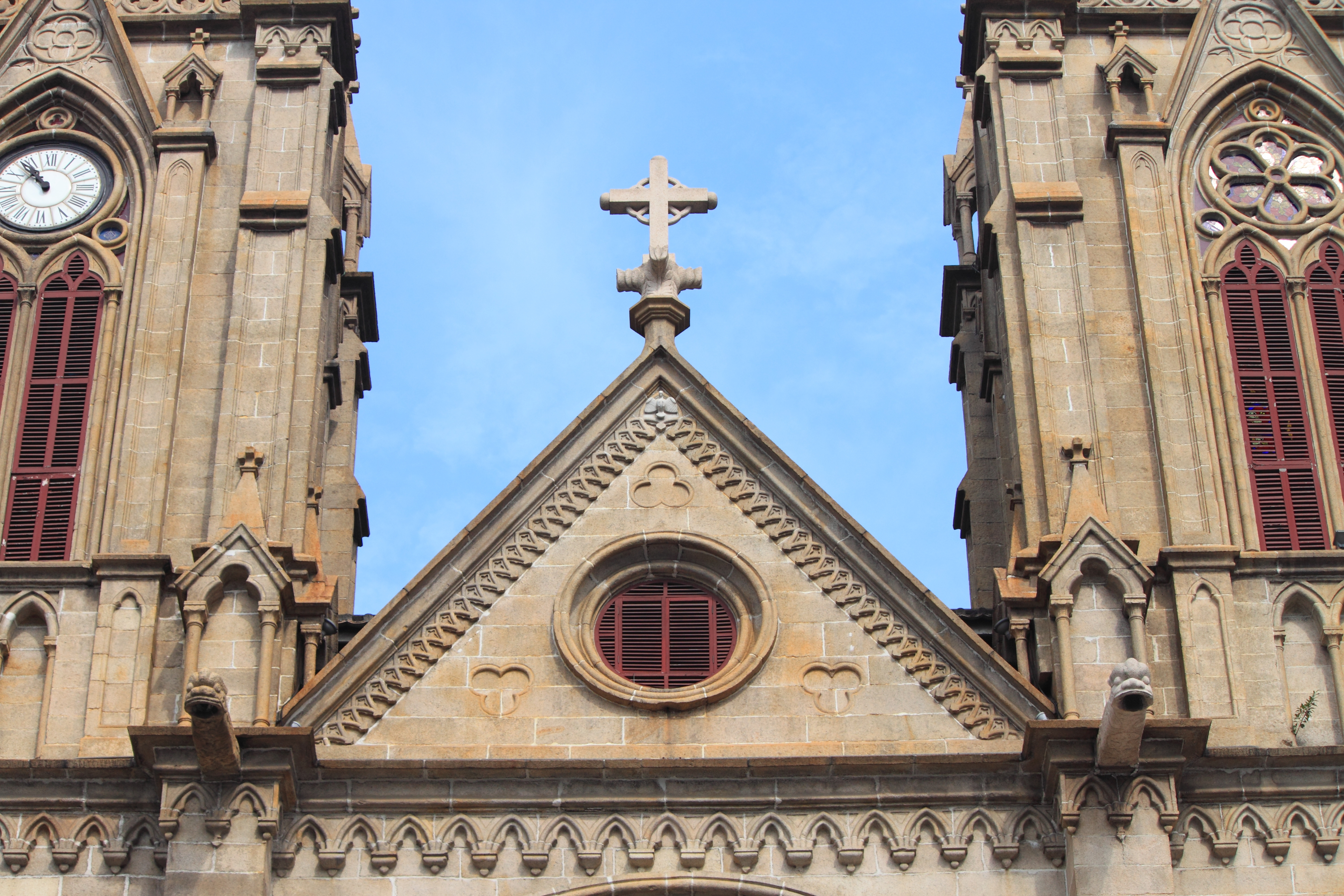

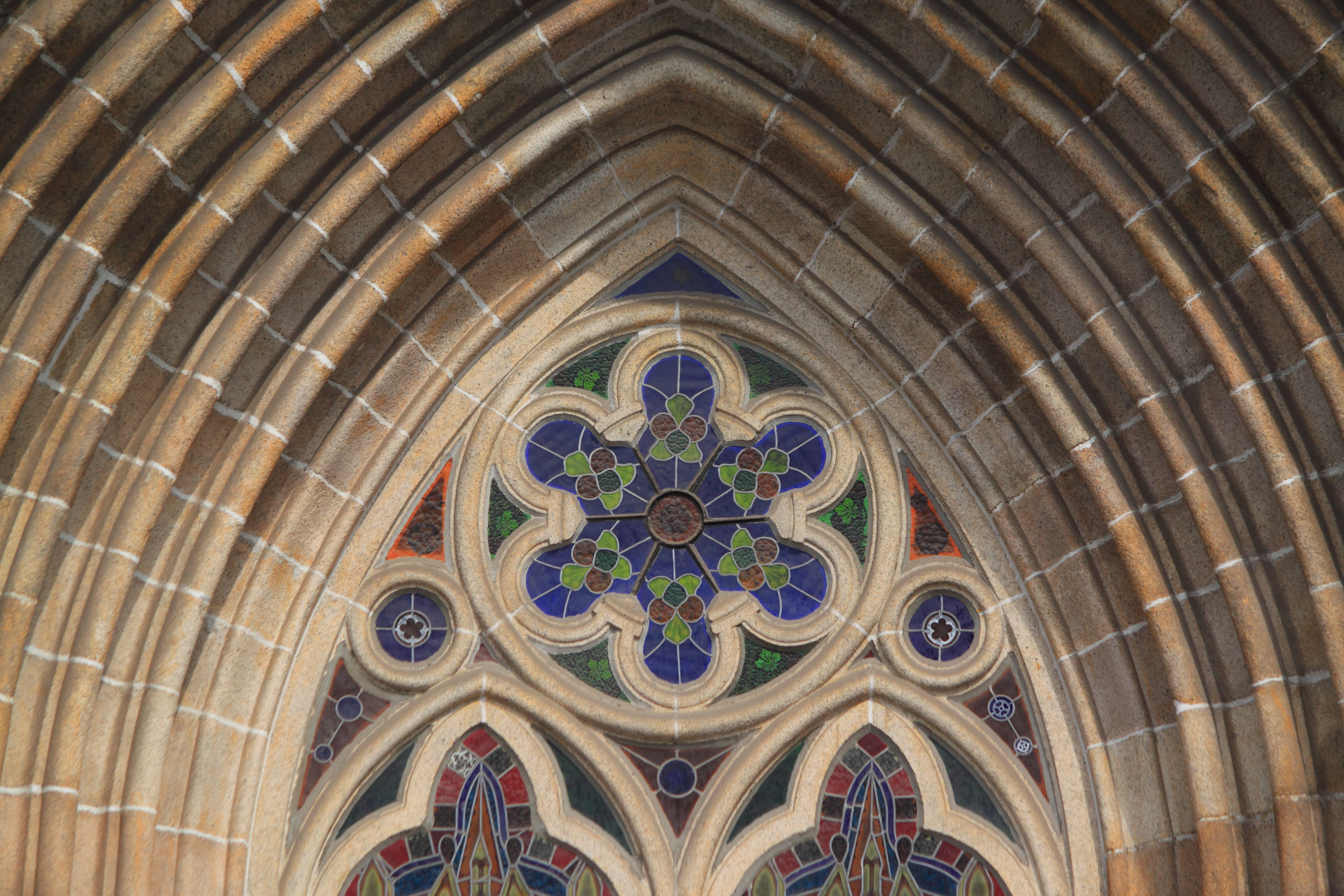

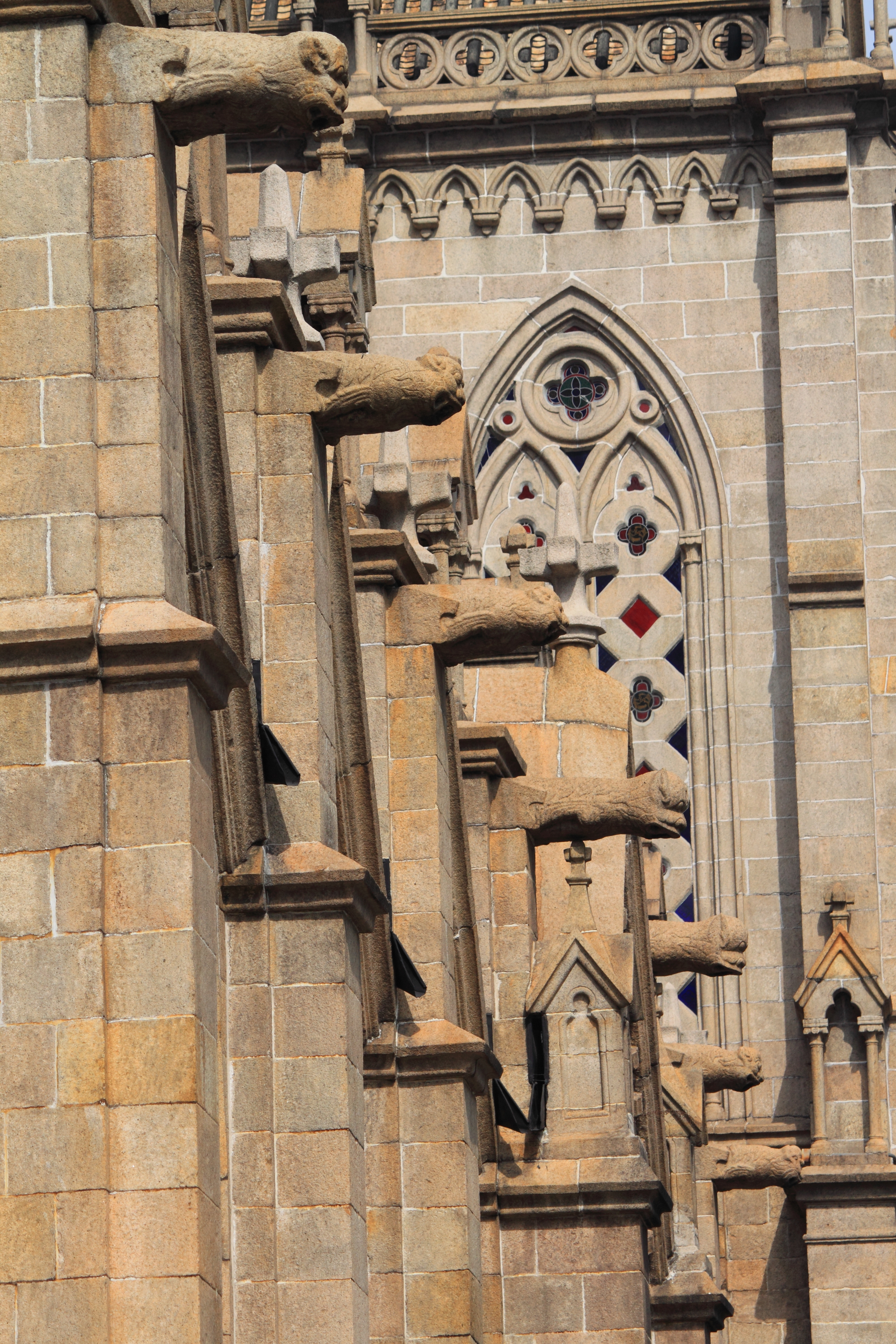

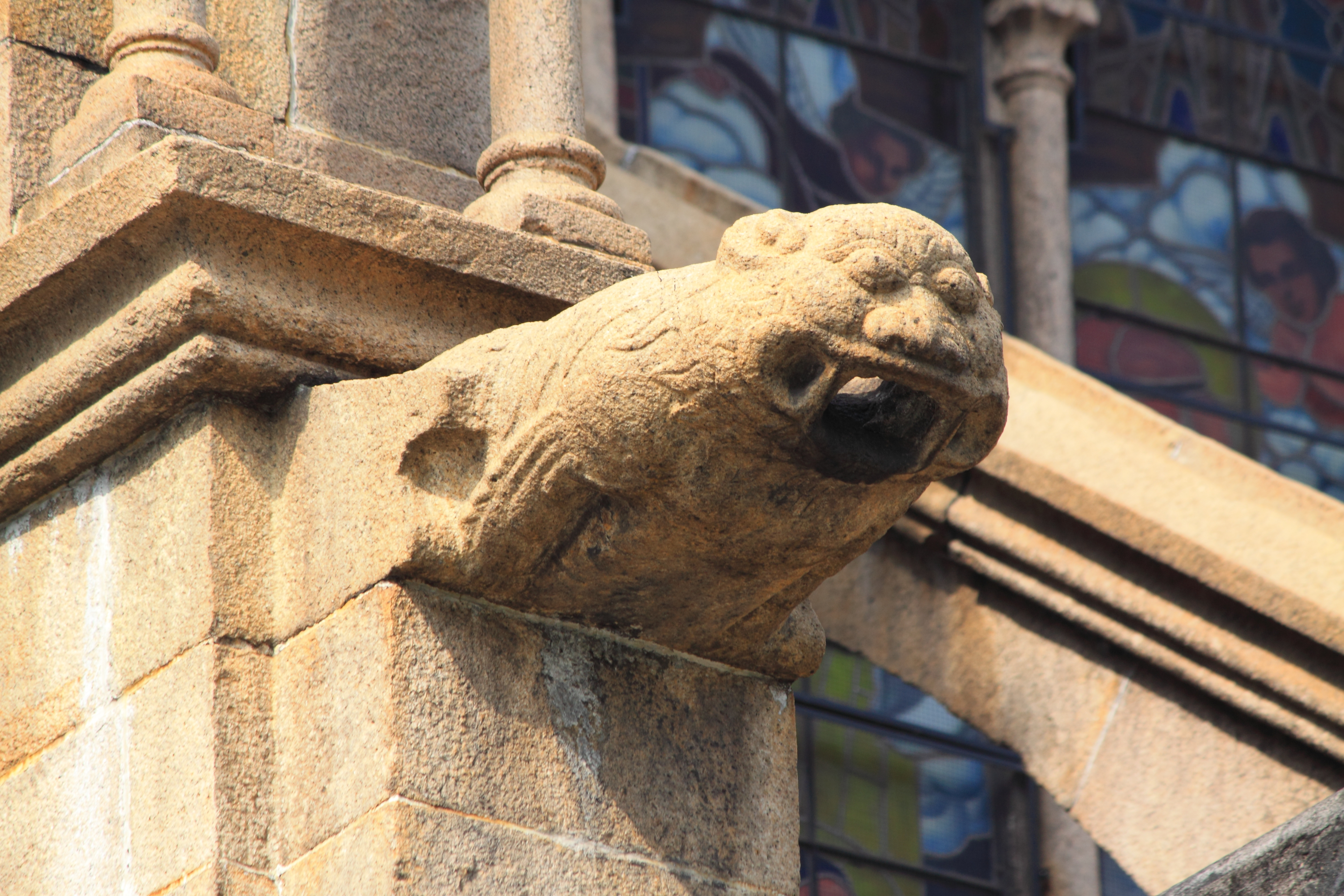

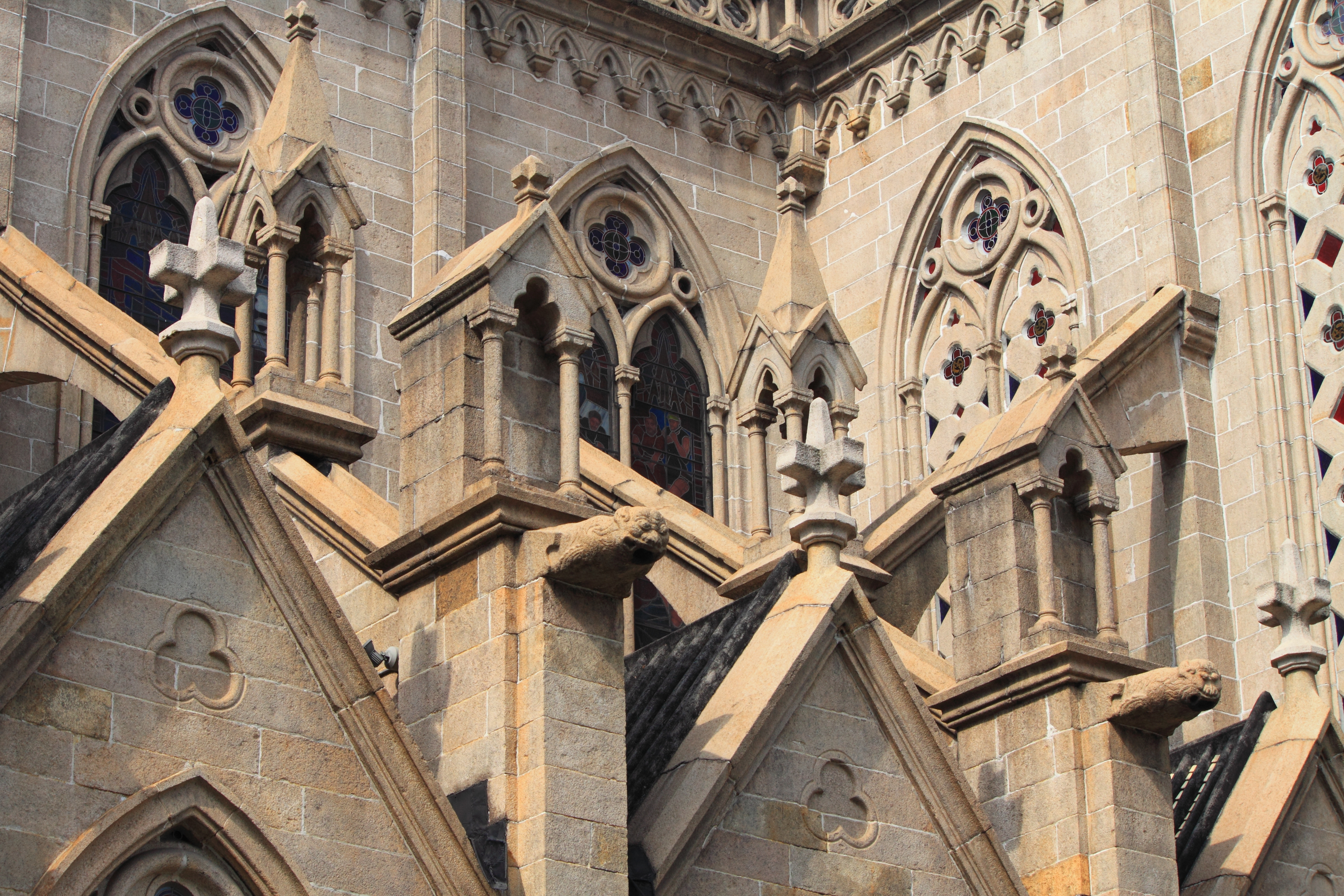

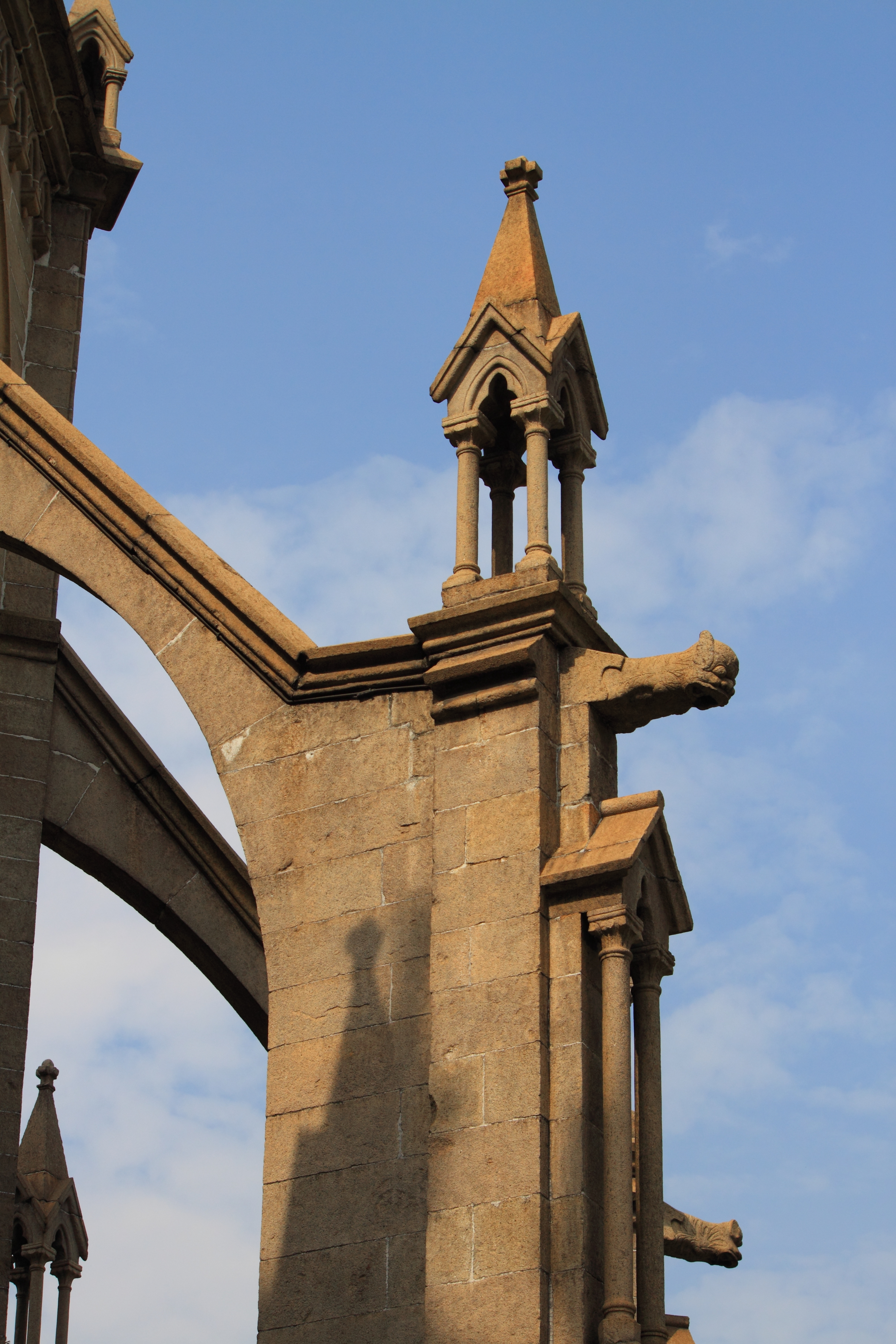

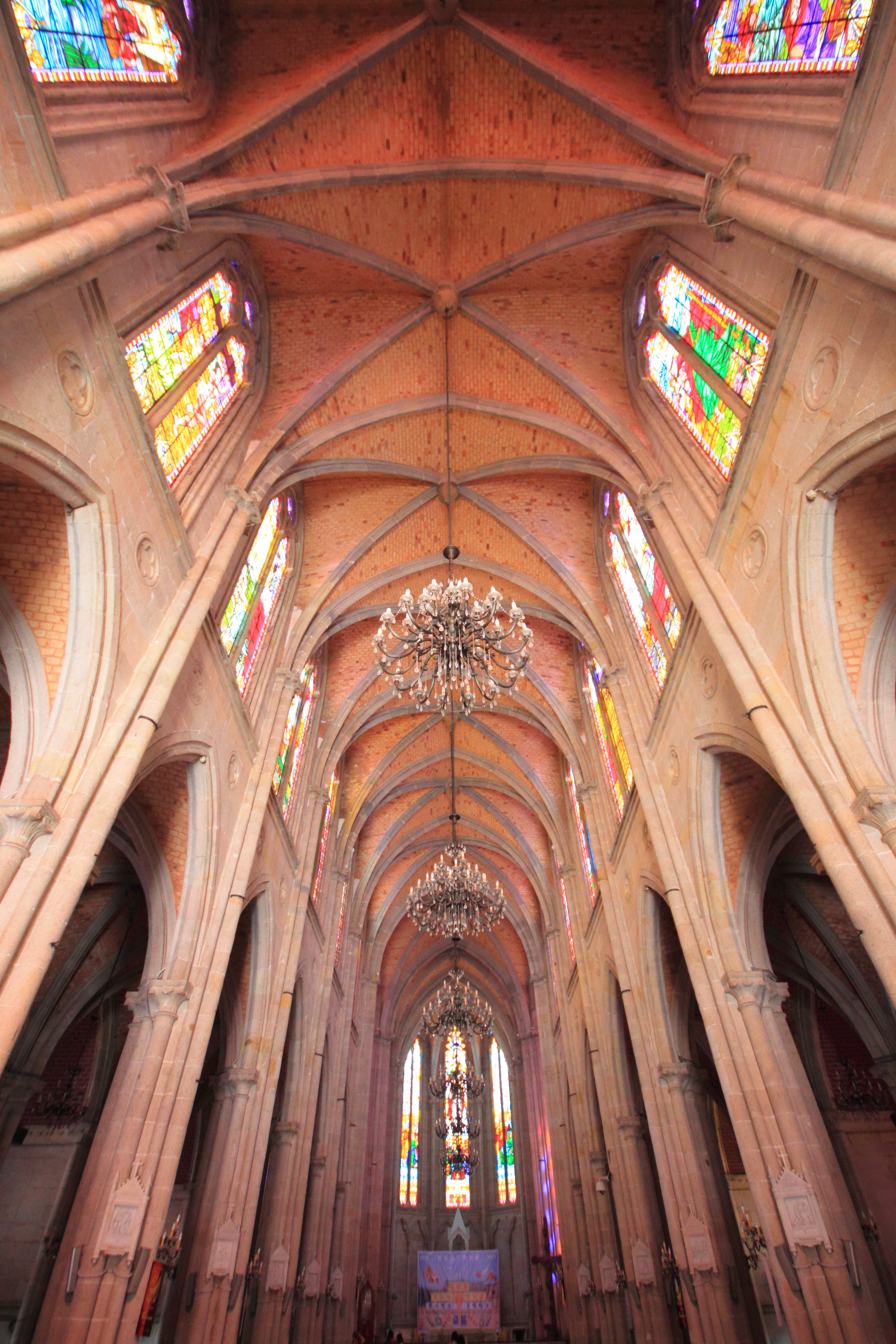

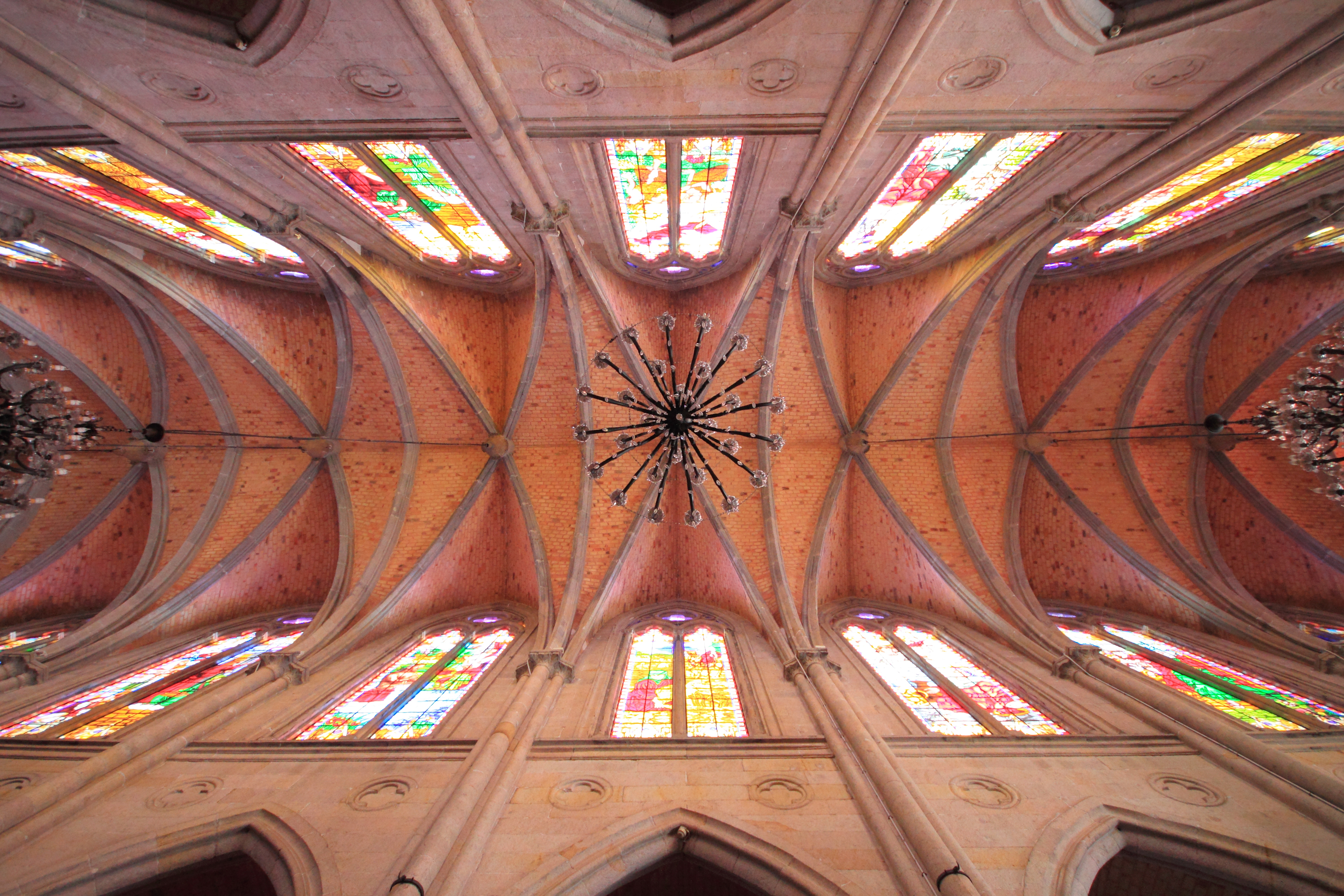

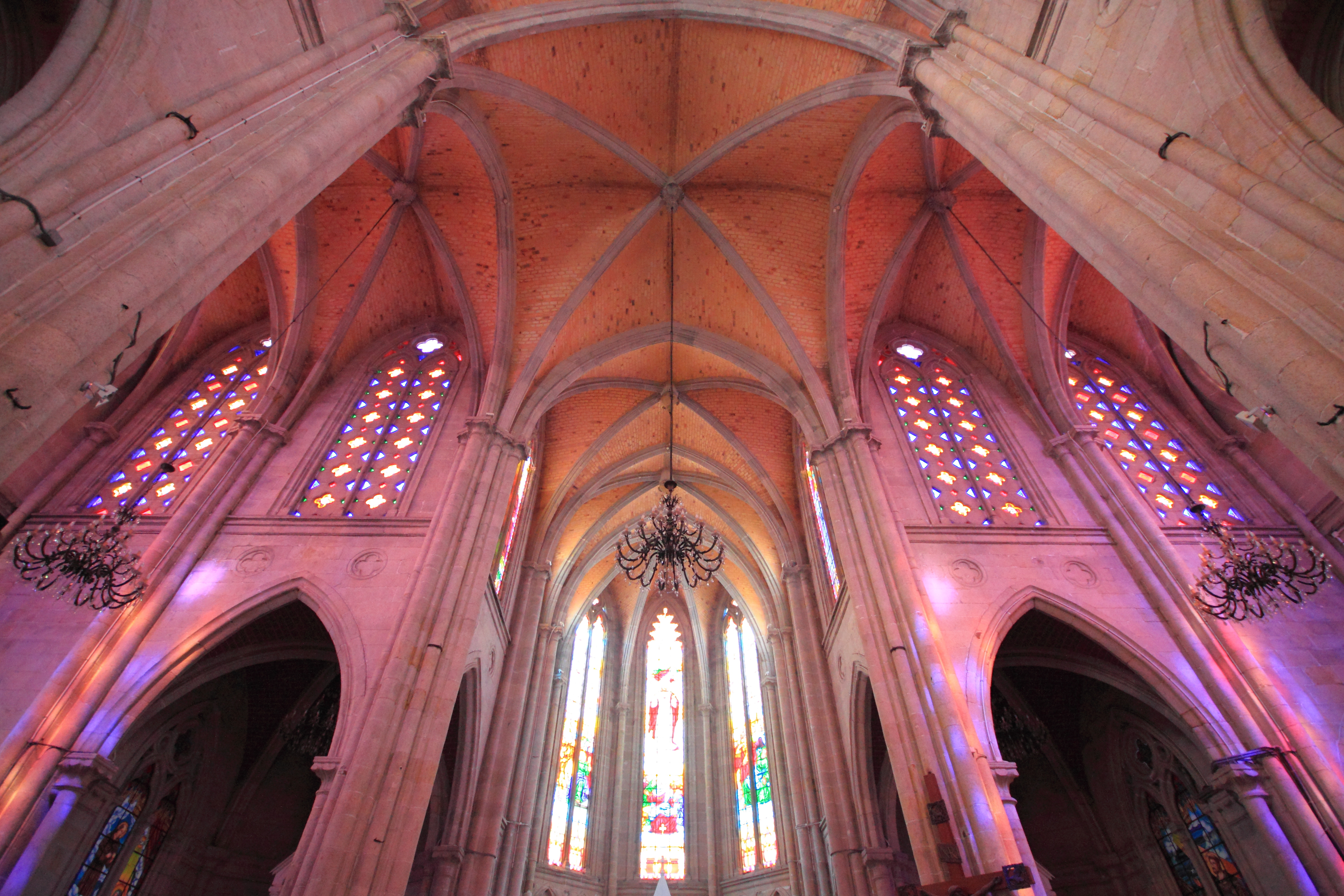

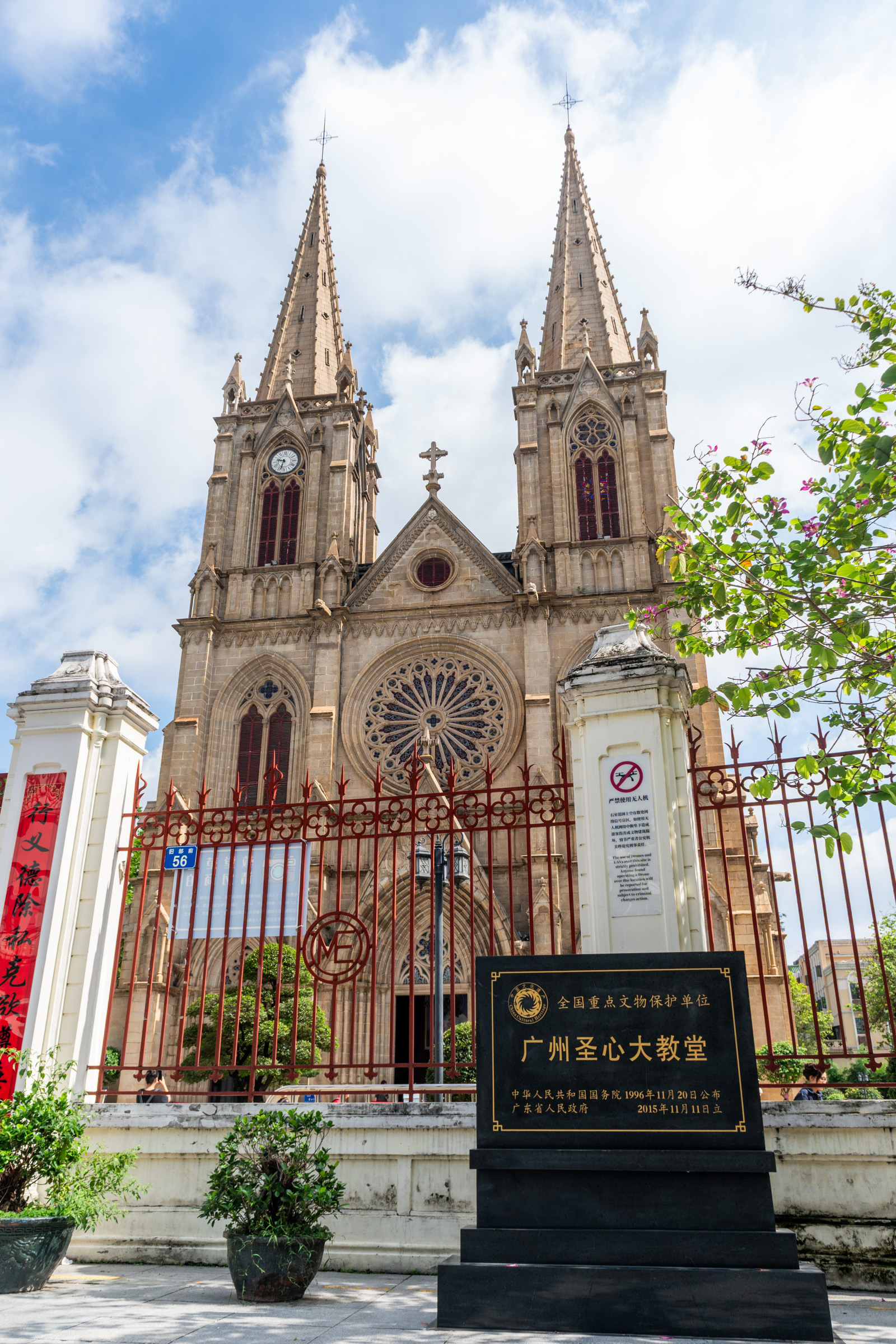

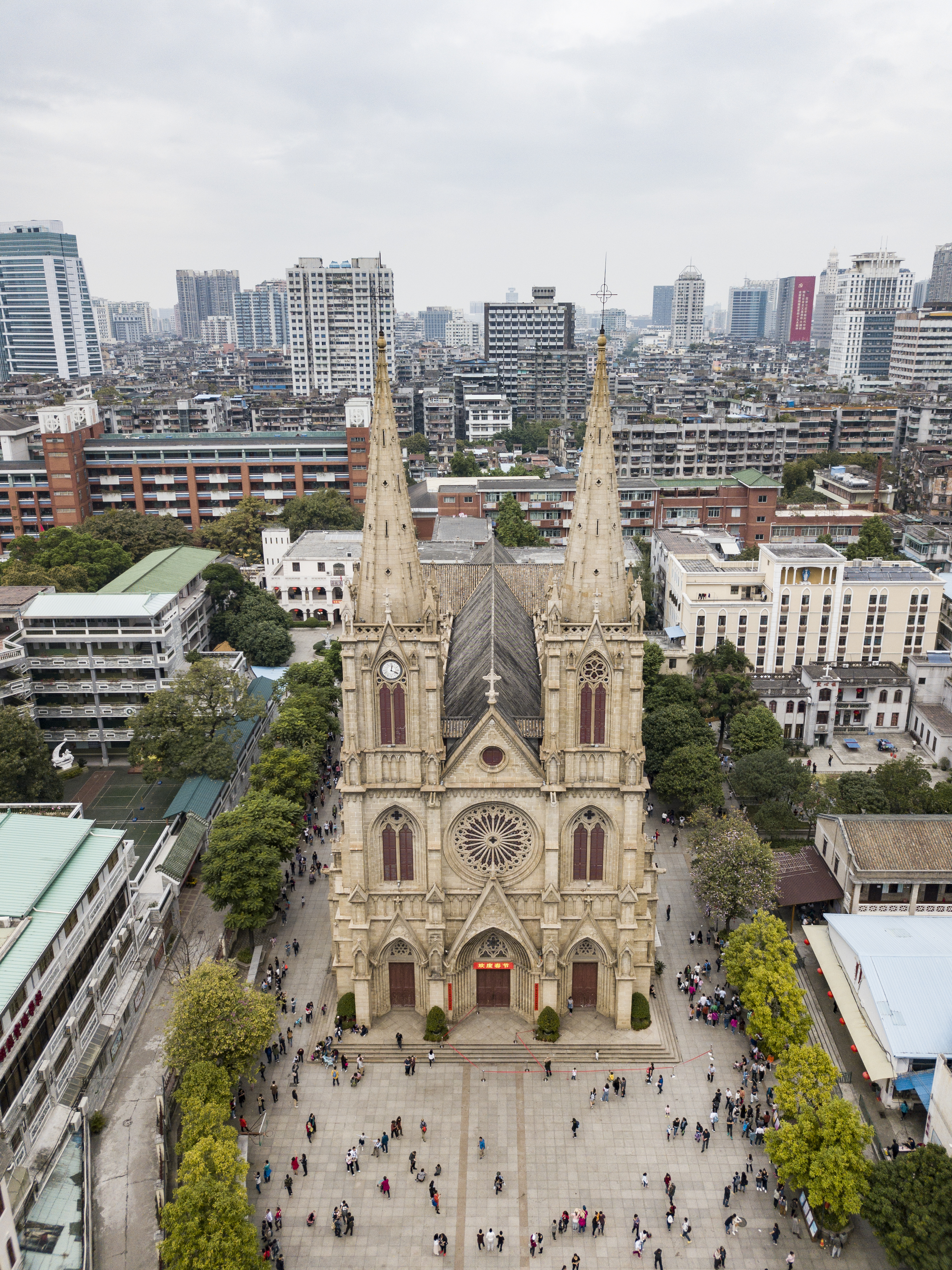

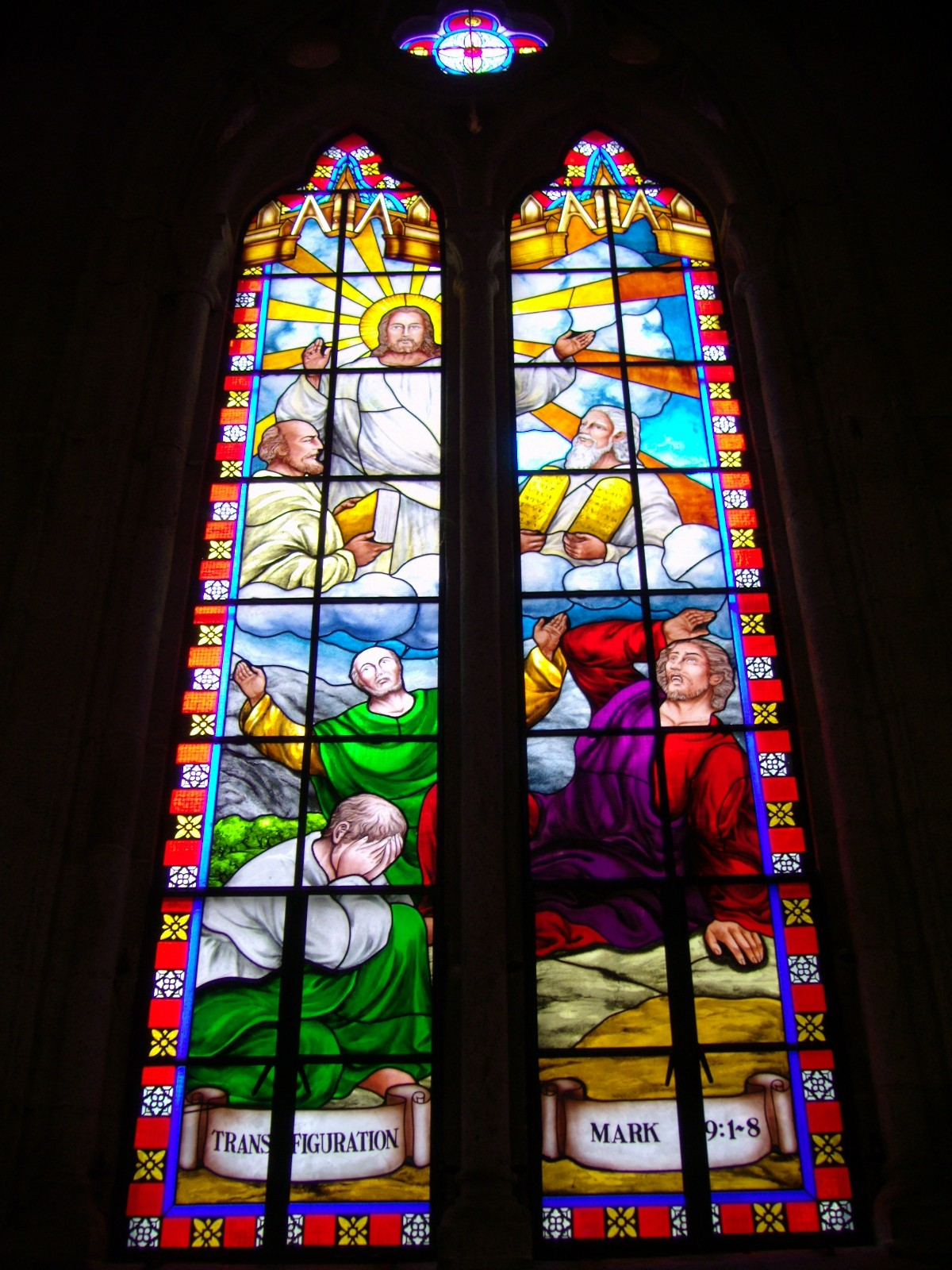

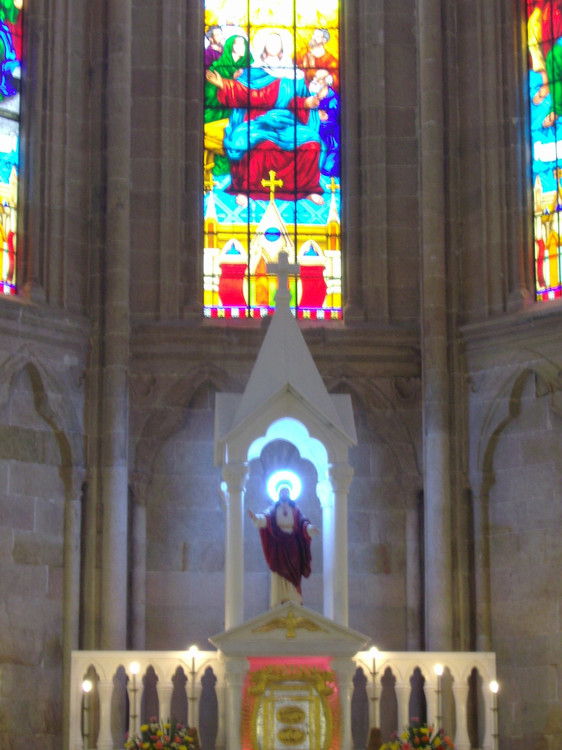

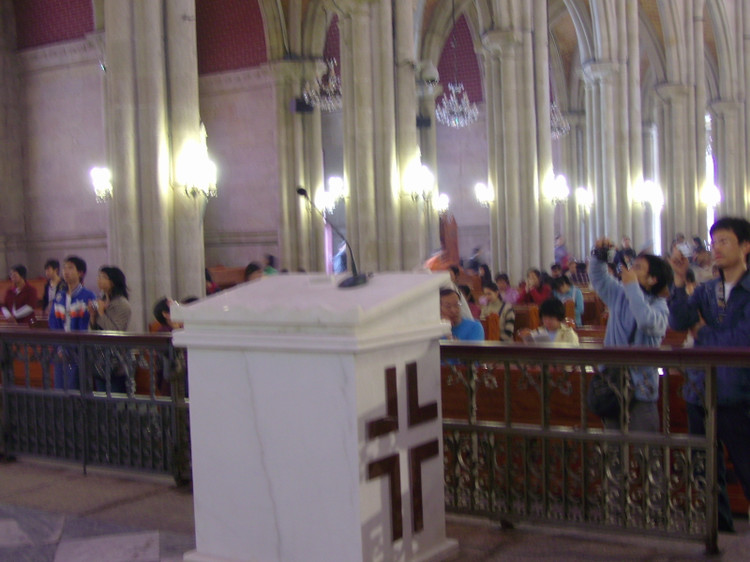

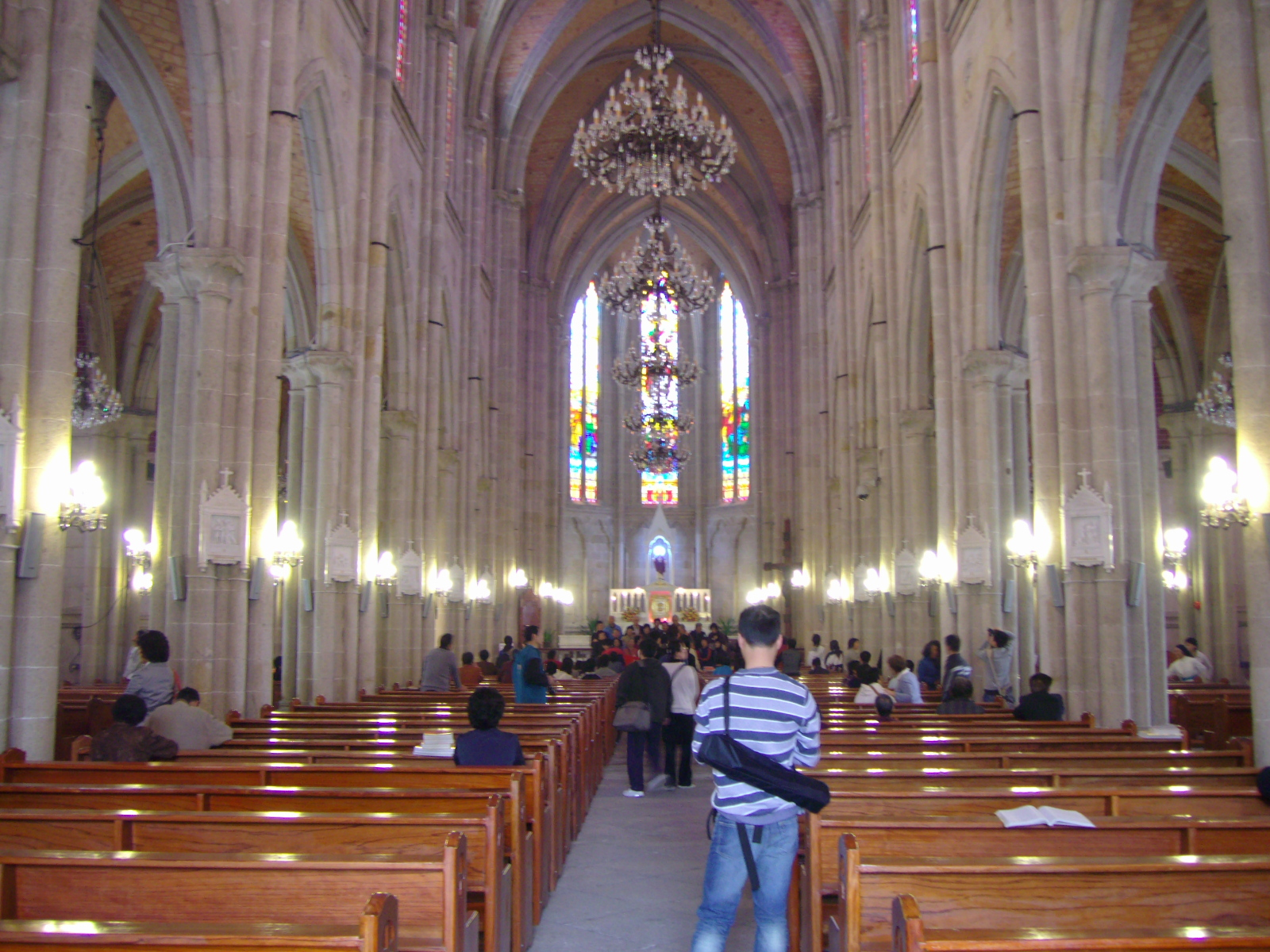

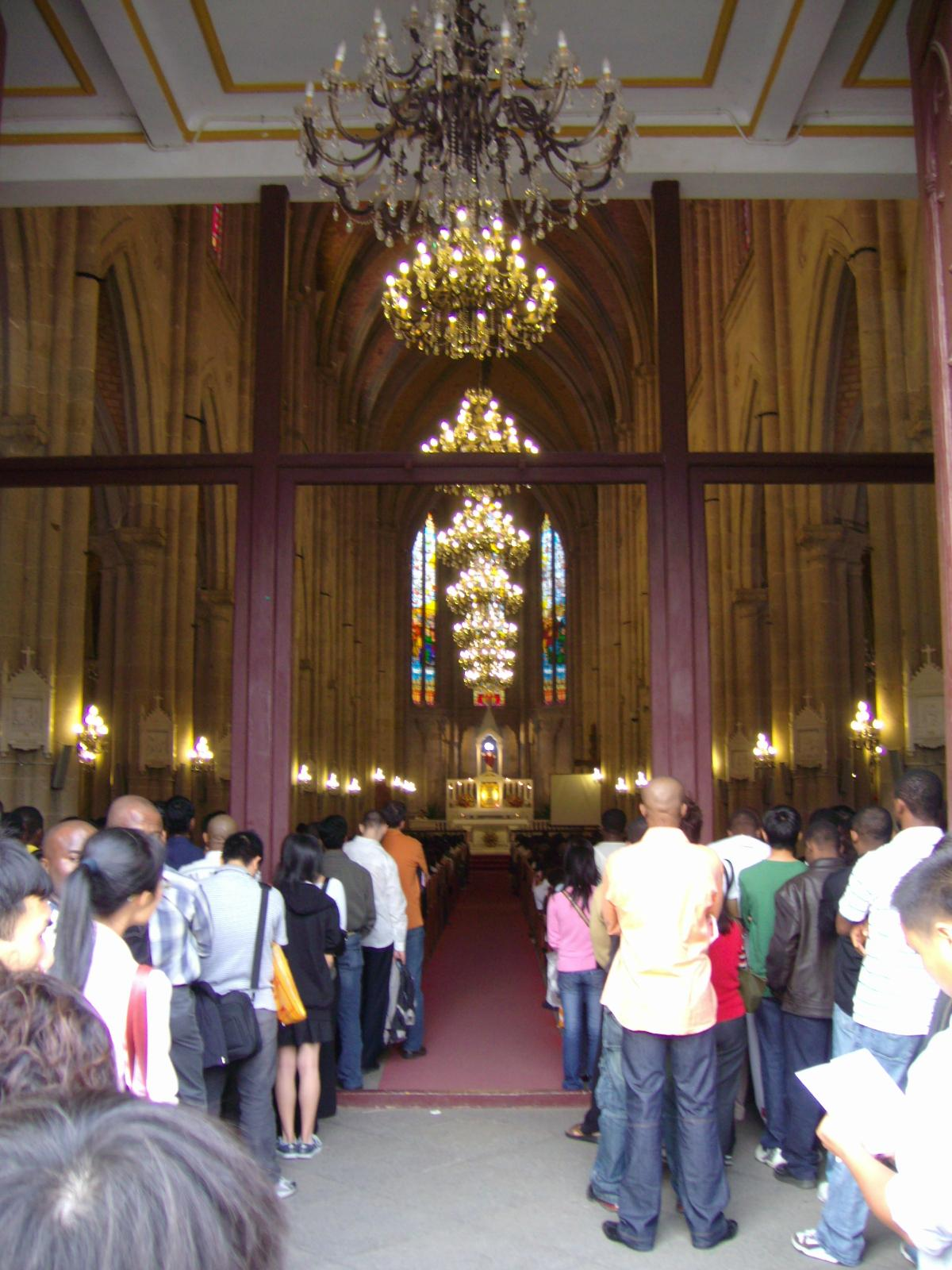

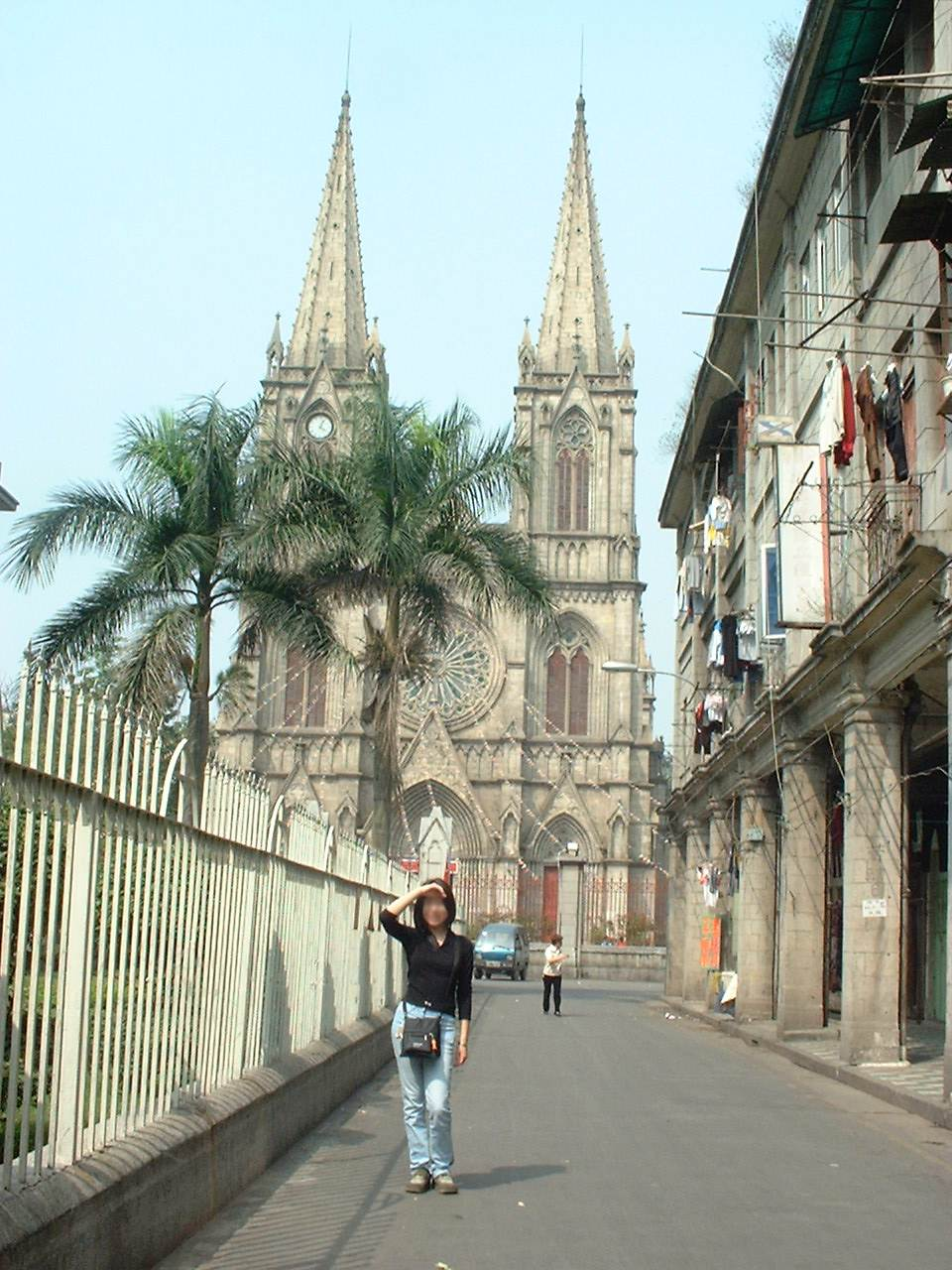

== See also ==
- Christianity & Catholicism in China
- Roman Catholic Archdiocese of Guangzhou
- List of Catholic cathedrals in China
- Dongshan Church (Guangzhou)
