= Diocese of Shaozhou =

Roman Catholic diocese in China

Coordinates: 24.8000°N 113.5830°E

Diocese of Chaozhou Dioecesis Sciaoceuvensis 天主教韶州教区

Location
- Country: China
- Ecclesiastical province: Guangzhou
- Metropolitan: Guangzhou

Statistics
- Population: Total; Catholics: (as of 1950); 2,500,000; 5,199 (0.2%)

Information
- Denomination: Roman Catholic
- Rite: Latin Rite

Current leadership
- Pope: Leo XIV
- Bishop: Sede Vacante
- Metropolitan Archbishop: Joseph Gan Junqiu

The Roman Catholic Diocese of Chaozhou/Shíuchow/Shaoguan (Latin: Sciaoceuven(sis), Chinese: 韶州, 韶關) is a diocese located in the city of Chaozhou in the ecclesiastical province of Guangzhou in China.

== History ==
- April 9, 1920: Established as the Apostolic Vicariate of Siuchow 韶州 from the Apostolic Vicariate of Guangzhou 廣州
- April 11, 1946: Promoted as Diocese of Siuchow/Shaozhou 韶州

(Chaozhou is exactly another city in Guangdong Province, based on the current Chinese pinyin system)

== Leadership ==
- Bishops of Chaozhou 韶州 (Roman rite)
  - Bishop Michele Alberto Arduino, S.D.B. (April 9, 1948 – October 21, 1962)
  - Bishop Ignazio Canazei, S.D.B. (April 11, 1946 – October 12, 1946)
- Vicars Apostolic of Siuchow 韶州 (Roman Rite)
  - Bishop Ignazio Canazei, S.D.B. (July 24, 1930 – April 11, 1946)
  - Saint Bishop Luigi Versiglia, S.D.B. (雷鳴道) (April 22, 1920 – February 25, 1930)
