= Diocese of Shantou =

Roman Catholic diocese in China

Coordinates: 23.3667°N 116.7000°E

Diocese of Shantou Dioecesis Scianteuvensis 天主教汕头教区
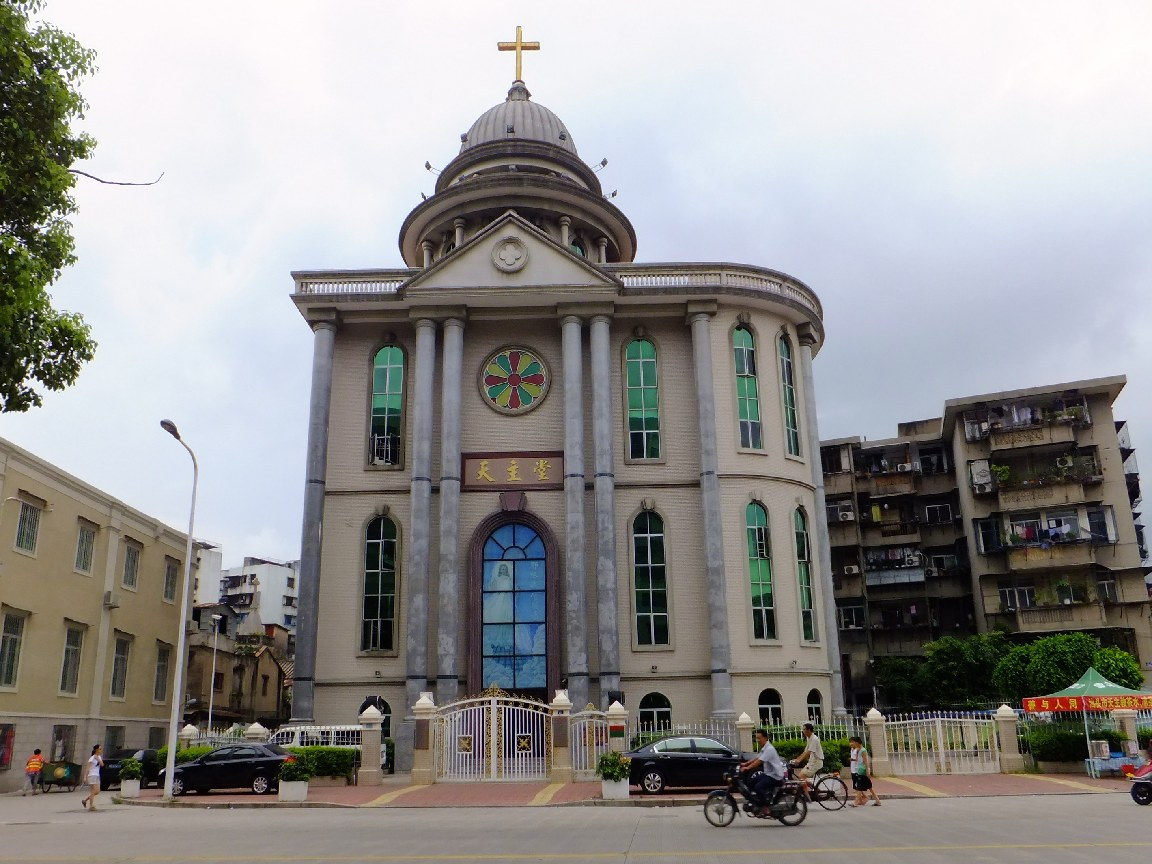
- Saint Joseph's Cathedral (Shantou)

Location
- Country: China
- Ecclesiastical province: Guangzhou
- Metropolitan: Guangzhou

Statistics
- Area: 20,000 km^{2} (7,700 sq mi)
- Population: Total; Catholics: (as of 2010); 17,500,000; 150,000 (0.8%)

Information
- Denomination: Roman Catholic
- Rite: Latin Rite
- Cathedral: Saint Joseph's Cathedral (Shantou), Guangdong

Current leadership
- Pope: Leo XIV
- Bishop: Joseph Huang Bingzhang
- Metropolitan Archbishop: Joseph Gan Junqiu
- Bishops emeritus: Peter Zhuang Jianjian

The Roman Catholic Diocese of Shantou/Swatow (Latin: Scianteuven(sis), Chinese: 汕頭) is a diocese located in the city of Shantou in the ecclesiastical province of Guangzhou in China.

== History ==
- April 6, 1914: Established as Apostolic Vicariate of Chaozhou 潮州 from the Apostolic Vicariate of Guangdong 廣東
- August 18, 1915: Renamed as Apostolic Vicariate of Shantou 汕頭
- April 11, 1946: Promoted as Diocese of Shantou 汕頭

== Leadership ==
- Bishops of Shantou 汕頭 (Roman rite)
  - Bishop Peter Zhuang Jianjian (2006–present) (Clandestinely)
  - Bishop John Cai Tiyuan (1981–2000)
  - Bishop Charles Vogel, M.E.P. (April 11, 1946–April 13, 1958)
- Vicars Apostolic of Shantou 汕頭 (Roman Rite)
  - Bishop Charles Vogel, M.E.P. (December 9, 1935–April 11, 1946)
  - Bishop Adolphe Rayssac, M.E.P. (July 17, 1914–May 1, 1935)
