= Diocese of Beihai =

Roman Catholic diocese in China

Coordinates: 21.4667°N 109.1000°E

Diocese of Beihai Dioecesis Pehaevensis 天主教北海教区

Location
- Country: China
- Ecclesiastical province: Guangzhou
- Metropolitan: Guangzhou

Statistics
- Area: 22,000 km^{2} (8,500 sq mi)
- Population: Total; Catholics: (as of 1950); 3,200,000; 15,105 (0.5%)

Information
- Rite: Latin Rite
- Cathedral: Cathedral of St Victor in Zhanjiang

Current leadership
- Pope: Leo XIV
- Bishop: Paul Su Yong-da
- Metropolitan Archbishop: Joseph Gan Junqiu

The Roman Catholic Diocese of Beihai/Pakhoi (Latin: Pehaeven(sis), Chinese: 北海) is a diocese located in the city of Beihai (Guangxi) in the ecclesiastical province of Guangzhou in China.

== History ==
- August 1, 1920: Established as Apostolic Vicariate of Western Guangdong and Hainan 粵西海南 from the Apostolic Vicariate of Guangzhou 廣州
- December 3, 1924: Renamed as Apostolic Vicariate of Beihai 北海
- April 11, 1946: Promoted as Diocese of Beihai 北海

== Leadership ==
- Bishops of Beihai 北海 (Roman rite)
  - Bishop Paul Su Yong-da (2004–present)
  - Bishop Gustave-Joseph Deswazières, M.E.P. (祝福) (April 11, 1946 – February 22, 1959)
- Vicars Apostolic of Beihai 北海 (Roman Rite)
  - Bishop Gustave-Joseph Deswazières, M.E.P. (祝福) (November 27, 1940 – April 11, 1946)
  - Bishop Jean-Baptiste-Michel-Marie-Louis Pénicaud, M.E.P. (贲德馨) (December 16, 1929 – February 1940)
  - Bishop Gustave-Joseph Deswazières, M.E.P. (祝福) (February 15, 1928 – November 1928)
  - Bishop Auguste Gauthier, M.E.P. (俄永垂) (December 3, 1924 – May 12, 1927)
- Vicars Apostolic of Western Guangdong and Hainan 粵西海南 (Roman Rite)
  - Bishop Auguste Gauthier, M.E.P. (俄永垂) (June 1, 1921 – December 3, 1924)
