= John Cai Tiyuan =

Chinese bishop

- Bishop of the Roman Catholic Diocese of Shantou
- Church: Cathedral of St. Joseph in Shantou
- Province: Guangdong
- Diocese: Roman Catholic Diocese of Shantou
- Installed: 1981
- Term ended: 1997
- Predecessor: Charles Vogel, M.E.P.
- Successor: Peter Zhuang Jianjian

Orders
- Ordination: 1949

Personal details
- Born: December 25, 1920 Jiexi County, Guangdong, China
- Died: November 24, 1997 (aged 76) Shantou, Guangdong, China
- Denomination: Roman Catholic

John Cai Tiyuan (simplified Chinese: 蔡体远; traditional Chinese: 蔡體遠; pinyin: Cài Tǐyuǎn; 25 December 1920 – 24 November 1997) was a Chinese Catholic priest and Bishop of the Roman Catholic Diocese of Shantou between 1981 and 1997.

== Biography ==
Cai was born into a Catholic family in Jiexi County, Guangdong, China, on 25 December 1920. In 1936 he was accepted to Jieyang Petrus Monastery. He was ordained a priest in February 1949. In 1981, he became the first priest to be elected by the Catholic Patriotic Association after the Cultural Revolution. In 1986, he was elected as one of two vice presidents for the government-approved Catholic Diocese Conference affiliated with the Chinese Catholic Patriotic Association. He eventually became the leader of the conference's liturgical commission. Cai celebrated his first Chinese Mass in February 1993. In July of the following year, he was elected President of the Guangdong Provincial Patriotic Association. He also became a member of the 7th National People's Congress in 1988, and was re-elected in 1993. He died on 24 November 1997.

Catholic Church titles
Previous: Charles Vogel, M.E.P.	Bishop of the Roman Catholic Diocese of Shantou; 1981–1997	Next: Peter Zhuang Jianjian
