= Lin Bingliang =

Chinese Catholic priest (1913–2001)

Lin Bingliang (English: James Lin Bing-liang; June 6, 1913 – May 25, 2001; also known as Ye Yinyun; holy name: James the Great) was a Catholic Church priest, a self-selected saint of the Chinese Catholic Patriotic Association Bishop of the Archdiocese of Guangzhou (1990-2001).

== Biography ==
林秉良 James Lin Bing-liang
- Self-proclaimed Catholic Archdiocese of Guangzhou Bishop of the Archdiocese of Guangzhou
- Diocese: Catholic Archdiocese of Guangzhou|Archdiocese of Guangzhou

Orders
- Ordination: 1931-09-14
- Consecration: 1990-05-06 China’s self-selected list of holy bishops by Zong Huaide (Zhoucun Diocese)|Zong Huaide

Personal details
- Born: Mainland Period of the Republic of China|Republic of China Guangdong Province (Republic of China)|Guangdong Province Huiyang

Lin Bingliang was born on June 6, 1913, in Huiyang, Guangdong Province, the Republic of China. In 1924, when he was 11 years old, he entered the Saint Francis of Assisi Minor Seminary in Guangzhou. 1941, he graduated from the Holy Spirit Seminary in British Hong Kong. On September 14 of the same year, Lin Bingliang was ordained a priest in the Roman Catholic Diocese of Hong Kong at 28. Later, he returned to the Apostolic Vicariate of Guangzhou and served as a senior priest in Guangzhou, Dongguan and Heyuan parishes.

On October 1, 1949, the Chinese Communist Party established the People's Republic of China in mainland China and began to carry out religious persecution and suppression of Catholicism. The church was no longer able to function normally. During the Cultural Revolution from 1966 to 1979, all religious activities in the diocese ceased. In the early 1980s, the Guangzhou Archdiocese resumed operations, and Father Lin Bingliang was appointed the Cathedral of the Sacred Heart of Jesus chief priest.

On February 15, 1990, promoted by China's Catholic Patriotic Association, an organization controlled by the Chinese government and forced by the government, the Archdiocese of Guangzhou elected Lin Bingliang as the bishop of the Archdiocese of Guangzhou without the permission of the Pope. On March 13 of the same year, Ye Yinyun, the illegitimate bishop of the Archdiocese of Guangzhou, died.

On May 6 of the same year, Lin Bingliang was officiated by the illegitimate bishop Joseph Zong Huaide of the Zhoucun Diocese of Shandong Province. The illegitimate bishop Cai Tiyuan the Shantou Diocese of Guangdong and the illegitimate bishop Zhong Quanzhang Xiangli of the Jiaying Diocese illegally self-selected themselves to be ordained pastors. Afterwards, Lin Bingliang was excommunicated because he violated the Canon Code of Canon Law and committed self-consecration without the permission of the then Pope John Paul II.

On February 15, 1990, promoted by the Chinese Catholic Patriotic Association, an organization controlled by the Chinese government and forced by the government, the Archdiocese of Guangzhou elected Lin Bingliang as the bishop of the Archdiocese of Guangzhou without the permission of the Pope. On March 13 of the same year, Ye Yinyun, the illegitimate bishop of the Archdiocese of Guangzhou, died.
