= Joseph Huang Bingzhang =

Chinese bishop

- Vice-President of Chinese Patriotic Catholic Association
- Native name: 黄炳章
- Installed: December 2016

Orders
- Ordination: 1991
- Consecration: 14 July 2011 by John Fang Xing Yao

Personal details
- Born: January 1967 (age 59) Huilai County, Guangdong, China
- Denomination: Roman Catholic
- Residence: Beijing, China
- Education: Central and South Catholic Academy of Theology and Philosophy
- Coat of arms

Joseph Huang Bingzhang (simplified Chinese: 黄炳章; traditional Chinese: 黃炳章; pinyin: Huáng Bǐngzhāng; born January 1967) is a Chinese Roman Catholic Bishop of Shantou, Guangdong. He is now the vice-president of Chinese Patriotic Catholic Association. He was a deputy to the 11th and 13th National People's Congress.

== Biography ==
Huang was born in Huilai County, Guangdong, in 1967. He was ordained a priest in 1991. On July 14, 2011, he became the Bishop of Shantou, Guangdong, without papal permission and was excommunicated latae sententiae. In December 2016, he was elected vice-president of Chinese Patriotic Catholic Association.

On September 22, 2018, Pope Francis lifted the excommunication of Joseph Huang Bingzhang and other bishops previously appointed by the Chinese government without a pontifical mandate.
