= List of Catholic dioceses in China =

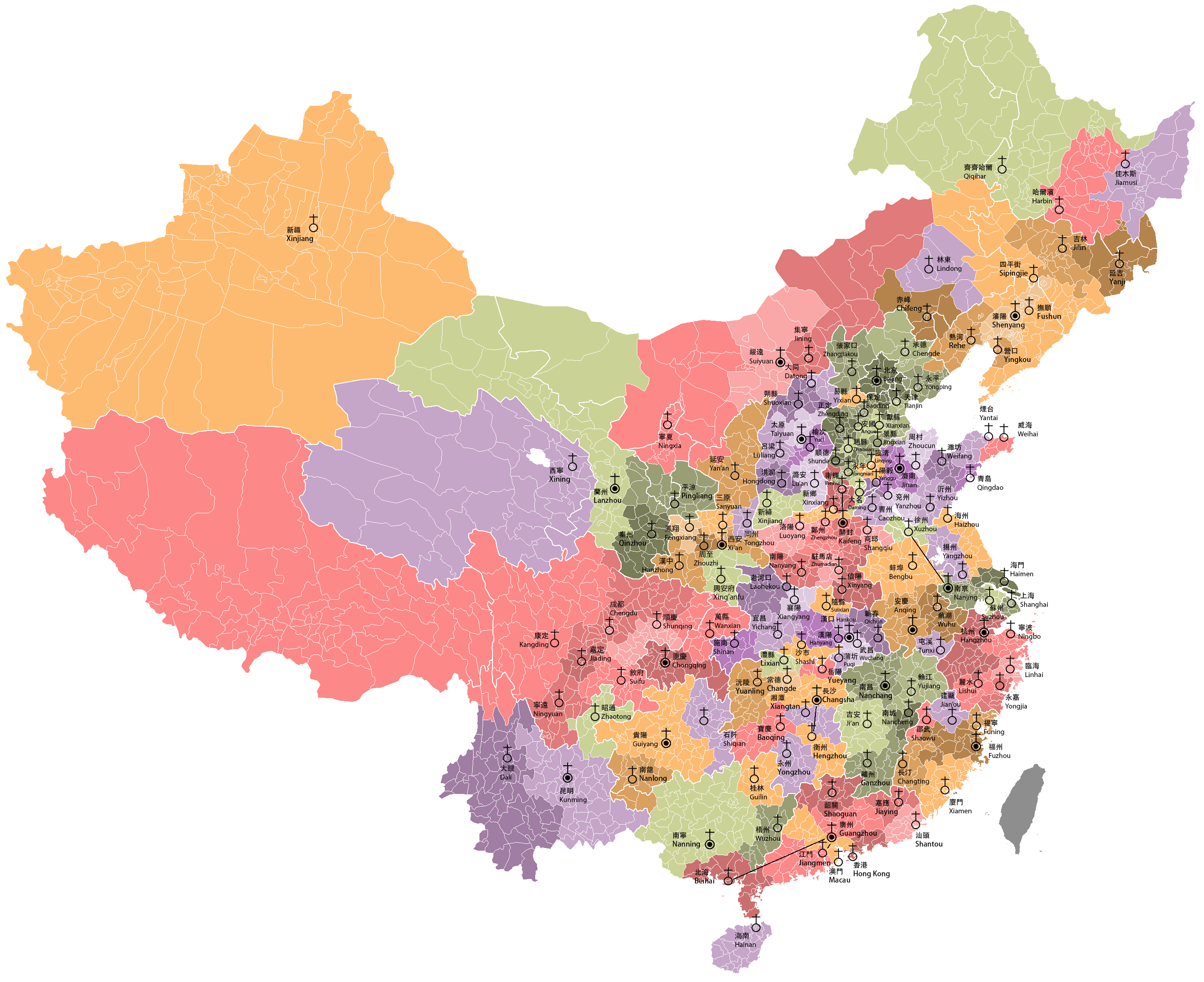
Map of (Roman-rite) Catholic Dioceses in China (PRC) as of September 2025

The Catholic Church in Greater China comprises 152 Latin jurisdictions:

- 21 ecclesiastical provinces (including one for Taiwan), consisting of 21 metropolitan archdioceses and 101 suffragan dioceses
- 28 apostolic prefectures
- 1 exempt diocese, the Diocese of Macau
- 1 apostolic administration, the Apostolic Administration of Harbin

Furthermore, the Eastern Catholic (Byzantine rite) Russian Greek Catholic Church has an exempt apostolic exarchate for China in Harbin.

There is an apostolic nunciature as papal diplomatic representation (embassy-level) to China, in Taipei, the seat of government of the Republic of China on Taiwan, also charged with mainland China, Hong Kong and Macau.

The Catholic Church recognizes the Republic of China as the sole government for all of China; nevertheless, it does not recognize all of its territorial claims. In this context, the term "China" is understood as including Hong Kong, Macao, and Taiwan in its 1949 provincial boundaries and mainland China as effectively controlled by the People's Republic of China. Due to the non-recognition of the People's Republic of China, however, the authority of the Taipei-based Chinese Regional Bishops' Conference is effectively limited to the islands of Taiwan, Penghu, Kinmen and Matsu. The dioceses of Hong Kong (suffragan of Guangzhou) and Macao (exempt) do not belong to that conference. The dioceses of mainland China take part in the Beijing-based Chinese Bishops Conference, which is not recognized by the Holy See.

== Current Latin dioceses in Greater China ==
Note that the diocese of Hong Kong belongs to the Ecclesiastical Province of Guangzhou, whereas the diocese of Macau is exempt. Also note that a small part of the diocese of Xiamen, the island of Kinmen, is administered by the Republic of China. At this moment, this part of the diocese is administered by the archdiocese of Taipei.

In all of greater China, only one non-Latin jurisdiction exists: an apostolic exarchate of the Russian Greek Catholic Church in Harbin. It has, however, been vacant since 1939.

Area	Archdioceses	Dioceses	Apostolic prefectures	Apostolic administrations	Total
Mainland China	20	94	28	1	143
Hong Kong	0	1	0	0	1
Macau	0	1	0	0	1
Taiwan	1	6	0	0	7
Total	21	101	29	1	152

However, the Chinese government has its own division of the dioceses, which is not necessarily identical to that of the Holy See. For example, many dioceses have been merged, and the difference between archdioceses, dioceses, apostolic prefectures and apostolic administrations has been abolished. Thus, according to the Chinese government, mainland China is divided into 104 jurisdictions, all dioceses.

Originally, the ecclesiastical provinces were closely aligned with the civil provinces of China. However, the borders of most provinces have not been redrawn again for decades. As a general guideline, however, the ecclesiastical provinces largely correspond with the following civil provinces:

Ecclesiastical province	Civil province	Jurisdictions (Holy See)	Jurisdictions (CPCA)
Anqing	Anhui	4	1
Beijing	Beijing, Hebei, Tianjin	15 (16 if including Xiwanzi)	12
Changsha	Hunan	9	1
Chongqing	Chongqing, Sichuan, Tibet	8	8
Fuzhou	Fujian	6	4
Guangzhou	Guangdong, Hong Kong(, Macau, Hainan)	9 (including Hong Kong and Macau; 8 if excluding Beihai)	7 (9 including Hong Kong and Macau)
Guiyang	Guizhou	3	1
Hangzhou	Zhejiang	5	5
Hankou	Hubei	11	5
Jinan	Shandong	11	9
Kaifeng	Henan	9	9
Kunming	Yunnan	3	3
Lanzhou	Gansu(, Qinghai, Xinjiang)	5	5
Nanchang	Jiangxi	5	1
Nanjing	Jiangsu, Shanghai	7	5
Nanning	Guangxi	3 (4 if including Beihai)	1
Shenyang	Jilin, Liaoning(, Heilongjiang)	12 (11 if excluding Chifeng)	3
Suiyuan	Inner Mongolia, Ningxia	4 (also 4 if including Chifeng and excluding Xiwanzi)	6
Taipei	Taiwan, Kaohsiung, New Taipei, Taichung, Tainan, Taipei, Taoyuan, Fujian (Kinmen-Matsu)	7	—
Taiyuan	Shanxi	8	10
Xi'an	Shaanxi	8	8
Total		152	104 (106 including Hong Kong, Macau)

The ecclesiastical jurisdictions in Hainan, Macao, Qinghai and Xinjiang are all exempt, though Macao is a diocese (the others are apostolic prefectures or apostolic administrations). Heilongjiang is also exempt, being administered by three apostolic prefectures, with the exception of some parts of Mudanjiang, which belong to the Roman Catholic Diocese of Yanji, which is located in Jilin province (Ecclesiastical Province of Shenyang).

In the Apostolic Constitution of 11 April 1946, all provinces are named by the name of the civil province as well as by the name of the archdiocese. The province of Suiyuan is described as the province of Mongolia, and the province of Shenyang as the province of Manchuria. However, these two names are not used anymore.

== Current Latin provinces and dioceses in PR China incl. Hong Kong ==
=== Ecclesiastical Province of Anqing ===
The Ecclesiastical Province of Anqing roughly covers the territory of Anhui province. The archdiocese is located in Anqing, even though Hefei has been the provincial capital since the 1940s – in fact, no diocese is located in Hefei. Also, apart from the archdiocese and the two diocese, there is also one exempt jurisdiction, the Apostolic Prefecture of Tunxi.

- Metropolitan Archdiocese of Anqing 安慶
  - Diocese of Bengbu 蚌埠
  - Diocese of Wuhu 蕪湖

=== Ecclesiastical Province of Beijing ===
The territory of the Ecclesiastical Province of Beijing is largely equal to that of Hebei province, when including Beijing and Tianjin. An important exception was Chengde; however, in 2018, the diocese of Chengde was erected, a suffragan of the archdiocese of Beijing, covering the entire prefecture-level city of Chengde. Furthermore, Puyang and Xinxiang's Changyuan County (Henan province) belong to the diocese of Daming (Ecclesiastical Province of Beijing), whereas Handan's Linzhang County, She County and Wu'an (all located in Hebei) belong to the diocese of Weihui (Ecclesiastical Province of Kaifeng). Shandongs Ningjin County also belongs to the diocese of Jingxian. Parts of Qinhuangdao and Zhangjiakou do not belong to the Ecclesiastical Province of Beijing. Furthermore, the Apostolic Prefecture of Yixian has not yet been elevated to the rank of diocese, and as such is not yet part of the Ecclesiastical Province of Beijing, but is still exempt.

- Metropolitan Archdiocese of Beijing 北京
  - Diocese of Anguo 安國
  - Diocese of Baoding 保定
  - Diocese of Chengde 承德
  - Diocese of Daming 大名
  - Diocese of Jingxian 景縣 (also known as Hengshui)
  - Diocese of Shunde 順得
  - Diocese of Tianjin 天津
  - Diocese of Xianxian 獻縣 (also known as Cangzhou)
  - Diocese of Yongnian 永年
  - Diocese of Yongping 永平 (also known as Tangshan)
  - Diocese of Zhaoxian 趙縣
  - Diocese of Zhangjiakou 張家口 (Merged from Xiwanzi and Xuanhua)
  - Diocese of Zhengding 正定

=== Ecclesiastical Province of Changsha ===
The Ecclesiastical Province of Changsha roughly covers the territory of Hunan province. In Hunan province, five exempt jurisdictions are also located: the Apostolic Prefecture of Baoqing, the Apostolic Prefecture of Lixian, the Apostolic Prefecture of Xiangtan, the Apostolic Prefecture of Yongzhou and the Apostolic Prefecture of Yueyang.

- Metropolitan Archdiocese of Changsha 長沙
  - Diocese of Changde 常德
  - Diocese of Hengzhou 衡州
  - Diocese of Yuanling 沅陵

=== Ecclesiastical Province of Chongqing ===
The Ecclesiastical Province of Chongqing roughly corresponds to Sichuan and Chongqing (Chongqing was separated from Sichuan in 1997) and also covers Tibet, though the diocese serving Tibet, the diocese of Kangding, is located in Sichuan. All the dioceses are located in Sichuan, except for Chongqing and Wanxian, which are located in Chongqing.

- Metropolitan Archdiocese of Chongqing 重慶
  - Diocese of Chengdu 成都
  - Diocese of Jiading 嘉定
  - Diocese of Kangding 康定
  - Diocese of Ningyuan 甯遠
  - Diocese of Shunqing 順慶
  - Diocese of Suifu 敘府
  - Diocese of Wanxian 萬縣

=== Ecclesiastical Province of Fuzhou ===
The Ecclesiastical Province of Fuzhou roughly covers the territory of Fujian province. In Fujian province, two exempt jurisdictions are also located: the Apostolic Prefecture of Jian'ou and the Apostolic Prefecture of Shaowu. Note that Kinmen belongs to the diocese of Xiamen, and Matsu Islands belongs to Metropolitan Archdiocese of Fuzhou, but both are administered by the archdiocese of Taipei.

- Metropolitan Archdiocese of Fuzhou 福州
  - Diocese of Funing 福寧
  - Diocese of Tingzhou 汀州
  - Diocese of Xiamen 廈門

=== Ecclesiastical Province of Guangzhou ===
The Ecclesiastical Province of Guangzhou roughly covers Guangdong and Hong Kong. Nearby Macau and Hainan are both exempt: the diocese of Macau and the Apostolic Prefecture of Hainan. Also, note that the diocese of Beihai is located in Guangxi.

- Metropolitan Archdiocese of Guangzhou 廣州
  - Diocese of Beihai 北海
  - Diocese of Hong Kong 香港 (de facto extempt to the Holy See since 1951)
  - Diocese of Jiangmen 江門
  - Diocese of Jiaying 嘉應
  - Diocese of Shantou 汕頭
  - Diocese of Shaozhou 韶州

=== Ecclesiastical Province of Guiyang ===
The Ecclesiastical Province of Guiyang roughly covers the territory of Guizhou. In Guizhou province, one exempt jurisdiction is also located: the Apostolic Prefecture of Shiqian.

- Metropolitan Archdiocese of Guiyang 貴陽
  - Diocese of Nanlong 南龍

=== Ecclesiastical Province of Hangzhou ===
The Ecclesiastical Province of Hangzhou roughly covers the territory of Zhejiang.

- Metropolitan Archdiocese of Hangzhou 杭州
  - Diocese of Lishui 麗水
  - Diocese of Ningbo 寧波
  - Diocese of Taizhou 台州
  - Diocese of Yongjia 永嘉

=== Ecclesiastical Province of Hankou ===
The Ecclesiastical Province of Hankou roughly corresponds with Hubei. Hankou has been merged with Wuchang and Hanyang to form Wuhan in 1927. Apart from the dioceses, two exempt jurisdictions exist, the Apostolic Prefecture of Shashi and the Apostolic Prefecture of Suixian.

- Metropolitan Archdiocese of Hankou 漢口
  - Diocese of Hanyang 漢陽
  - Diocese of Laohekou 老河口
  - Diocese of Puqi 蒲圻
  - Diocese of Qizhou 蘄州
  - Diocese of Shinan 施南
  - Diocese of Wuchang 武昌
  - Diocese of Xiangyang 襄陽
  - Diocese of Yichang 宜昌

=== Ecclesiastical Province of Jinan ===
Apart from the dioceses, Shandong province also has two apostolic prefectures: the Apostolic Prefecture of Weihai and the Apostolic Prefecture of Linqing. However, even after taking this into account, the boundaries do not completely correspond with Shandong province.

- Metropolitan Archdiocese of Jinan 濟南
  - Diocese of Caozhou 曹州
  - Diocese of Qingdao 青島
  - Diocese of Yanggu 陽穀
  - Diocese of Yantai 煙台
  - Diocese of Yanzhou 兖州
  - Diocese of Yizhou 沂州
  - Diocese of Zhoucun 周村
  - Diocese of Weifang 濰坊 (elevated in 2023)

=== Ecclesiastical Province of Kaifeng ===
The territory of the Ecclesiastical Province of Kaifeng is almost equal to that of Henan province. However, Puyang and Xinxiang's Changyuan County belong to the diocese of Daming (Ecclesiastical Province of Beijing), whereas Handan's Linzhang County, She County and Wu'an (all located in Hebei) belong to the diocese of Weihui. Furthermore, the Apostolic Prefecture of Xinxiang has not yet been elevated to the rank of diocese, and as such is not yet part of the Ecclesiastical Province of Kaifeng, but is still exempt.

Note that the archdiocese is located in Kaifeng, and not in Zhengzhou, the provincial capital of Henan since 1954.

- Metropolitan Archdiocese of Kaifeng 開封
  - Diocese of Guide 歸德 (also known as Shangqiu)
  - Diocese of Luoyang 洛陽
  - Diocese of Nanyang 南陽
  - Diocese of Weihui 衛輝 (also known as Anyang)
  - Diocese of Xinyang 信陽
  - Diocese of Zhengzhou 鄭州
  - Diocese of Zhumadian 駐馬店

=== Ecclesiastical Province of Kunming ===
The Ecclesiastical Province of Kunming roughly covers the territory of Yunnan. In Yunnan province, one exempt jurisdiction is also located: the Apostolic Prefecture of Zhaotong.

- Metropolitan Archdiocese of Kunming 昆明
  - Diocese of Dali 大理

=== Ecclesiastical Province of Lanzhou ===
The Ecclesiastical Province of Lanzhou roughly covers the territory of Gansu. Note that Xinjiang is covered by the Apostolic Prefecture of Xinjiang-Urumqi and Qinghai by the Apostolic Prefecture of Xining. Historically, both provinces were part of the Apostolic Vicariate (now Archdiocese) of Lanzhou.

- Metropolitan Archdiocese of Lanzhou 蘭州
  - Diocese of Pingliang 平涼
  - Diocese of Qinzhou 秦州

=== Ecclesiastical Province of Nanchang ===
The Ecclesiastical Province of Nanchang roughly covers the territory of Jiangxi.

- Metropolitan Archdiocese of Nanchang 南昌
  - Diocese of Ganzhou 贛州
  - Diocese of Ji’an 吉安
  - Diocese of Nancheng 南城
  - Diocese of Yujiang 餘江

=== Ecclesiastical Province of Nanjing ===
The Ecclesiastical Province of Nanjing roughly covers the territory of Jiangsu and Shanghai. In Jiangsu province, two exempt jurisdictions are also located: the Apostolic Prefecture of Haizhou and the Apostolic Prefecture of Yangzhou.

- Metropolitan Archdiocese of Nanjing 南京
  - Diocese of Haimen 海門
  - Diocese of Shanghai 上海
  - Diocese of Suzhou 蘇州
  - Diocese of Xuzhou 徐州

=== Ecclesiastical Province of Nanning ===
The Ecclesiastical Province of Nanning roughly covers the territory of Guangxi. In Guangxi, one exempt jurisdiction is also located: the Apostolic Prefecture of Guilin. Also, note that the diocese of Beihai, which is located in Guangxi, is part of the Ecclesiastical Province of Guangdong.

- Metropolitan Archdiocese of Nanning 南寧
  - Diocese of Wuzhou 梧州

=== Ecclesiastical Province of Shenyang ===
The Ecclesiastical Province of Shenyang (Shenyang is the capital of Liaoning) roughly covers Liaoning and Jilin. However, the Diocese of Chifeng belongs to the Ecclesiastical Province of Shenyang, but is located in Inner Mongolia. Furthermore, the diocese of Yanji (in Jilin) also covers a very small part of Heilongjiang. Some parts of the North-East are covered by exempt jurisdictions: the Apostolic Administration of Harbin, the Apostolic Prefecture of Jiamusi, the Apostolic Prefecture of Lindong and the Apostolic Prefecture of Qiqihar.

Harbin is also the seat of the Eastern Catholic Russian Catholic Apostolic Exarchate of Harbin, which, however, has been vacant since 1952 and only exists on paper.

- Metropolitan Archdiocese of Shenyang 瀋陽
  - Diocese of Chifeng 赤峰
  - Diocese of Fushun 撫順
  - Diocese of Jilin 吉林
  - Diocese of Rehe 熱河
  - Diocese of Sipingjie 四平街
  - Diocese of Yanji 延吉
  - Diocese of Yingkou 營口

=== Ecclesiastical Province of Suiyuan ===
Suiyuan is now known as Hohhot; the dioceses roughly cover Inner Mongolia and Ningxia, though the diocese of Xiwanzi is actually located in Hebei. Also, the Diocese of Chifeng is located in Inner Mongolia, but belongs to the Ecclesiastical Province of Shenyang.

- Metropolitan Archdiocese of Suiyuan 綏遠 (also known as Hohhot)
  - Diocese of Jining 集寧
  - Diocese of Ningxia 寧夏
  - ~~Diocese of Xiwanzi 西彎子~~ (suppressed in 2025)

=== Ecclesiastical Province of Taiyuan ===
The territory of the Ecclesiastical Province of Taiyuan is almost equal to that of Shanxi province. However, the Apostolic Prefecture of Xinjiang (also referred to as Yuncheng or Jiangzhou) has not yet been elevated to the rank of diocese, and as such is not yet part of the Ecclesiastical Province of Taiyuan, but is still exempt.

- Metropolitan Archdiocese of Taiyuan 太原
  - Diocese of Datong 大同
  - Diocese of Fenyang 汾陽 (also known as Lüliang)
  - Diocese of Hongdong 洪洞 (also known as Linfen)
  - Diocese of Lu’an 潞安 (also known as Changzhi)
  - Diocese of Shuozhou 朔州
  - Diocese of Yuci 榆次 (also known as Jinzhong)

=== Ecclesiastical Province of Xi'an ===
Apart from the dioceses, Shaanxi province also has two apostolic prefectures: the Apostolic Prefecture of Tongzhou and the Apostolic Prefecture of Xing’anfu. However, even after taking this into account, the boundaries do not completely correspond with Shaanxi province.

- Metropolitan Archdiocese of Xi’an 西安
  - Diocese of Fengxiang 鳳翔
  - Diocese of Hanzhong 漢中
  - Diocese of Sanyuan 三原
  - Diocese of Yan’an 延安
  - Diocese of Zhouzhi 盩厔

== Current Latin province and dioceses in Taiwan ==
=== Ecclesiastical Province of Taipei ===
Catholic dioceses in Taiwan.

Note that Kinmen and the Matsu Islands belong to the diocese of Xiamen, but are administered by the archdiocese of Taipei with its Archbishop serving as an Apostolic Administrator in respect of the islands.

- Metropolitan Archdiocese of Taipei
  - Diocese of Chiayi
  - Diocese of Hualien
  - Diocese of Hsinchu
  - Diocese of Kaohsiung
  - Diocese of Taichung
  - Diocese of Tainan

== Current exempt jurisdictions, immediately subject to the Holy See ==
=== Dioceses ===
- Diocese of Macau
- Diocese of Hong Kong (de facto; de jure suffragan diocese to the Archdiocese of Guangzhou)

=== Apostolic Administrations ===
- Apostolic Administration of Harbin in Heilongjiang

=== Apostolic Prefectures ===
- Apostolic Prefecture of Baoqing (Paoking/Shaoyang) in Hunan
- Apostolic Prefecture of Guilin (Kweilin) in Guangxi
- Apostolic Prefecture of Hainan in Hainan
- Apostolic Prefecture of Haizhou (Donghai/ Haichow) in Jiangsu
- Apostolic Prefecture of Jiamusi (Kiamusze) in Heilongjiang
- Apostolic Prefecture of Jian'ou (Jianning/Kienning/Kienow) in Fujian
- Apostolic Prefecture of Lindong (Lintung) in Inner Mongolia
- Apostolic Prefecture of Linqing (Lintsing) in Shandong
- Apostolic Prefecture of Lixian (Lizhou/Lichow) in Hunan
- Apostolic Prefecture of Qiqihar (Tsitsikar) in Heilongjiang
- Apostolic Prefecture of Shaowu in Fujian
- Apostolic Prefecture of Shashi (Shasi) in Hubei
- Apostolic Prefecture of Shiqian (Shihtsien) in Guizhou
- Apostolic Prefecture of Suixian (Suihsien) in Hubei
- Apostolic Prefecture of Tongzhou (Tungchow) in Shaanxi
- Apostolic Prefecture of Tunxi (Tunki) in Anhui
- Apostolic Prefecture of Weihai (Weihaiwei) in Shandong
- Apostolic Prefecture of Xiangtan (Siangtan) in Hunan
- Apostolic Prefecture of Xing’anfu (Ankang/Hinganfu) in Shaanxi
- Apostolic Prefecture of Xining (Sining) in Qinghai
- Apostolic Prefecture of Xinjiang (Jiangzhou/ Kiangchow) in Shanxi
- Apostolic Prefecture of Xinjiang-Urumqi (Urumqi/Sinkiang/Xinjiang) in Xinjiang
- Apostolic Prefecture of Xinxiang (Sinsiang) in Henan
- Apostolic Prefecture of Yangzhou (Yangchow) in Jiangsu
- Apostolic Prefecture of Yixian (Yihsien) in Hebei
- Apostolic Prefecture of Yongzhou (Lingling/Yungchow) in Hunan
- Apostolic Prefecture of Yueyang (Yuezhou/Yochow) in Hunan
- Apostolic Prefecture of Zhaotong (Chaotung) in Yunnan

=== Eastern Catholic : Byzantine Rite ===
- Russian Catholic Apostolic Exarchate of Harbin (particular Russian Greek Catholic Church)

== Defunct jurisdictions ==
Most former jurisdictions have current successor sees (although many are vacant).

Suppressed without 'direct' successor (all in continental China) :

=== (Arch)Diocesan ===
There are no titular sees, and the Latin Titular Patriarchal See of All the East was suppressed in 1370 after a single incumbent, the Archbishop of Khanbalik.

- Archdiocese of Khanbalik
- Diocese of Citong
- Diocese of Ili-baluc alias Amaliaq alias Kulja (1320–1330)

=== Pre-diocesan ===
(some had their title preserved when merged into another)

- Apostolic Vicariate of Shansi
- Apostolic Vicariate of Kweichow
- Apostolic Vicariate of Kiangsi
- Apostolic Vicariate of Kokonur
- Mission sui juris of I-li (itself a late 'restoration' of the above diocese)

== Dioceses according to the Chinese Patriotic Catholic Association ==
The structure of dioceses of the CPCA is not the same one as that of the Holy See. First of all, the distinction between archdioceses, dioceses, apostolic prefectures and apostolic administrations is not maintained: only dioceses exist. Secondly, the dioceses are structured according to the administrative divisions of the PRC. Many dioceses have been merged; some provinces are only served by a single diocese. Except for the diocese of Kangding, which also covers Tibet, all dioceses are restricted to territory within a single province.

In total the CPCA has 104 dioceses, whereas according to the Holy See, mainland China has 143 jurisdictions. In the course of time, the CPCA has established five new dioceses (the Diocese of Jincheng and the Diocese of Xinzhou in Shanxi, the Diocese of Bayannur and the Diocese of Baotou in Inner Mongolia, and the Diocese of Zhanjiang in Guangdong. Forty-four other jurisdictions have been merged with other dioceses. For example, according to the Holy See, Hunan province exists of one archdiocese, three dioceses and four apostolic prefectures. These eight jurisdictions have all been merged by the CPCA to form a single diocese of Hunan. Furthermore, many dioceses have been renamed or have had their seat relocated to a nearby city; most of the dioceses boundaries have also been redrawn to correspond with current PRC administrative divisions. In general, Chinese prefectures have no more than one diocese, but there are exceptions: the prefecture of Baoding is divided in the Diocese of Baoding and the Diocese of Anguo.

This results in the following list of dioceses:

Diocese of Beijing
Diocese of Tianjin
Diocese of Shanghai
Diocese of Chongqing | Diocese of Wanzhou
Diocese of Shijiazhuang | Diocese of Cangzhou | Diocese of Tangshan | Diocese of Baoding | Diocese of Zhangjiakou | Diocese of Anguo | Diocese of Xingtai | Diocese of Handan | Diocese of Hengshui | Diocese of Chengde
Diocese of Nanjing | Diocese of Haimen | Diocese of Xuzhou | Diocese of Suzhou
Diocese of Fuzhou | Diocese of Xiamen | Diocese of Mindong | Diocese of Minbei
Diocese of Xi'an | Diocese of Hanzhong | Diocese of Yan'an | Diocese of Fengxiang | Diocese of Sanyuan | Diocese of Zhouzhi | Diocese of Ankang | Diocese of Weinan
Diocese of Chengdu | Diocese of Kangding | Diocese of Yibin | Diocese of Xichang | Diocese of Nanchong | Diocese of Leshan
Diocese of Liaoning
Diocese of Jilin
Diocese of Heilongjiang
Diocese of Hangzhou | Diocese of Ningbo | Diocese of Taizhou | Diocese of Lishui | Diocese of Wenzhou
Diocese of Wuhan | Diocese of Yichang | Diocese of Puqi | Diocese of Xiangfang | Diocese of Jingzhou
Diocese of Kunming | Diocese of Dali | Diocese of Zhaotong
Diocese of Taiyuan | Diocese of Changzhi | Diocese of Lüliang | Diocese of Datong | Diocese of Shuozhou | Diocese of Jinzhong | Diocese of Linfen | Diocese of Yuncheng | Diocese of Jincheng | Diocese of Xinzhou
Diocese of Kaifeng | Diocese of Nanyang | Diocese of Anyang | Diocese of Zhengzhou | Diocese of Xinyang | Diocese of Luoyang | Diocese of Shangqiu | Diocese of Zhumadian | Diocese of Xinxiang
Diocese of Guizhou
Diocese of Jiangxi
Diocese of Jinan | Diocese of Yanzhou | Diocese of Yantai | Diocese of Qingdao | Diocese of Heze | Diocese of Zhoucun | Diocese of Linyi | Diocese of Liaocheng | Diocese of Qingzhou
Diocese of Hohhot | Diocese of Chifeng | Diocese of Bayannur | Diocese of Baotou | Diocese of Ulanqab
Diocese of Ningxia
Diocese of Hunan
Diocese of Guangzhou | Diocese of Shantou | Diocese of Shaoguan | Diocese of Jiangmen | Diocese of Meizhou | Diocese of Zhanjiang
Diocese of Hainan
Diocese of Guangxi
Diocese of Lanzhou | Diocese of Tianshui | Diocese of Pingliang
Diocese of Xining
Diocese of Xinjiang
Diocese of Anhui

The CPCA has abolished and merged:
3 jurisdictions in Anhui
2 jurisdictions in Fujian
3 jurisdictions in Guangxi
2 jurisdictions in Guizhou
4 jurisdictions in Hebei
3 jurisdictions in Heilongjiang
6 jurisdictions in Hebei
7 jurisdictions in Hunan
1 jurisdiction in Inner Mongolia
2 jurisdictions in Jiangsu
4 jurisdictions in Jiangxi
2 jurisdictions in Jilin
3 jurisdictions in Liaoning
2 jurisdictions in Shandong

In total, 44 Holy See jurisdictions have been abolished and merged. This includes 26 out of 93 dioceses and 18 out of 29 apostolic prefectures.

The CPCA has established:
1 jurisdiction in Guangdong
2 jurisdictions in Inner Mongolia
2 jurisdictions in Shanxi

In total, 5 new CPCA jurisdictions have been established, all dioceses. Apart from these 5, the CPCA has also established a new diocese in Hebei, the Diocese of Chengde, but this diocese was recognized by the Holy See in 2018.

In the following provinces, no new dioceses were established and existing dioceses were not abolished: Beijing, Chongqing, Gansu, Hainan, Henan, Ningxia, Qinghai, Shaanxi, Shanghai, Sichuan, Tianjin, Tibet, Xinjiang, Yunnan and Zhejiang. In Guangdong and Zhejiang, no dioceses were abolished, but new diocese were established.

However, names of dioceses may have been changed, dioceses may have been elevated, and the boundaries of dioceses may have changed.

== See also ==
- List of Catholic dioceses (structured view)
- China–Holy See relations
- Holy See–Taiwan relations

== Sources and external links ==
- GCatholic.org.
