= Ecclesiastical circumscription immediately subject to the Holy See =

Dioceses immediately subject to the Holy See (Latin: Dioecesis Sedi Apostolicae immediately subiecta) in the Catholic Church are dioceses or ecclesiastical jurisdictions directly dependent upon the Holy See and not subject to the supervisory authority of a metropolitan archbishop, an exemption under Catholic canon law. An equivalent expression, now outdated, is exempt diocese (free from metropolitan jurisdiction).

== The traditional rule ==
The normal rule is that dioceses are assigned to various ecclesiastical provinces headed by a metropolitan archbishop, and these are known as suffragan dioceses. It may occur that, for especially historical reasons or other immediate concerns, a diocese—or, more exceptionally, an archdiocese—is not included within an ecclesiastical province but instead depends directly on the Holy See.

With the institution of ecclesiastical regions in some countries, the immediately subject dioceses also become part of these institutions, thereby reducing the difference between suffragan dioceses and those immediately subject.

A particular case is that of the ecclesiastical region of Lazio in Italy: the ecclesiastical province consists solely of the Diocese of Rome and the seven suburbicarian dioceses (with Rome always considered a diocese and not an archdiocese), and the remaining dioceses of the ecclesiastical region (known as “of number”) are subject to the Apostolic See. These dioceses are located within the 100-mile radius surrounding Rome, the former jurisdiction of the district of the Praefectus Urbi (the prefect of imperial Rome), a role that was preserved until August 15, 1972, by the Cardinal Vicar of Rome. The bishops of these dioceses must participate in the pontifical consistories and have the privilege of including four tassels on their episcopal coats of arms, just like the archbishops. In 1972 the term "of number" was abolished, and the bishops were granted the right to participate in consistories and to include the four tassels on their coats of arms.

The same applies to territorial abbeys or to the eparchies of the Eastern Catholic Churches, which are withdrawn from the ecclesiastical provinces in which they are located.

There are also historically originated cases, such as that of Lucca, which are legacies of times when there were no state boundaries separating the closest metropolises.

== Vatican II ==
The decree of the Vatican II document Christus Dominus, promulgated in 1965, established that all dioceses must belong to an ecclesiastical province. It was established by rule that dioceses immediately subject to the Holy See must form part of the nearest province.

== Exempt dioceses ==
These (arch)dioceses are exempt from belonging to any ecclesiastical province, hence only the Vatican can exert the authority and coordinating functions normally falling to the Metropolitan Archbishop. They are grouped here geographically. Nevertheless, most belong to an episcopal conference, in which case the more relevant mention is in its geographical region, as exempt dioceses as such do not have specific ties with each other.

- Military Ordinariates are in pastoral charge of the troops of a state, but may be vested in a Metropolitan Archbishop, typically in the national capital.
- Also generally exempt are the apostolic prefectures and apostolic vicariates, which tend to be temporary missionary dioceses, expected to become part of an ecclesiastical province when promoted to regular (arch- or suffragan) bishopric.
- The Personal Ordinariates for former Anglicans (who left the Anglican Communion for communion with the Holy See) are allowed to use the Ordinariate Use, which is counted as a variant usage of the Roman Rite (unlike the Eastern churches' five distinct rites).
- Eastern Ordinariates are in pastoral charge of all Eastern Churches, of only those of Byzantine Rite or even just of the Armenian Rite, in one or more states of various Catholic churches without any proper diocese there, but are usually vested in a Roman Catholic Metropolitan Archbishop, often in the capital.
- Disregarded are many episcopal or archiepiscopal prelates in the Roman Curia, as their dicasteries don't constitute dioceses, although many posts there require by law or custom a bishop or an archbishop (usually titular), just as the Vatican's diplomatic posts in nearly every national capital.

=== Universal or transcontinental exempt dioceses (not counting minor dependencies) ===
- The personal prelature (a unique status) of Opus Dei, with a cathedral see (Santa Maria della Pace ai Parioli) in Rome, ranking as bishopric.
- The transcontinental Apostolic Administration of the Caucasus covering both Georgia (including breakaway self-declared states Abkhazia and South Ossetia) and Armenia, with cathedral see at Tbilisi (Georgia).
- The Personal Ordinariate of Our Lady of the Southern Cross (for former Anglicans in Australia and Japan).

=== European exempt dioceses ===
- in Austria:
  - Ordinariate for Byzantine-rite Catholics in Austria, vested in the Metropolitan Archbishop of capital Vienna
  - Military Ordinariate of Austria, not vested in any see
- in Belgium: Military Ordinariate of Belgium, vested in the primatial Metropolitan Archbishop of Mechelen-Brussels
- in Bosnia and Herzegovina: Military Ordinariate of Bosnia and Herzegovina, not vested in any see
- in Bulgaria:
  - Diocese of Nicopoli
  - Diocese of Sofia and Plovdiv
  - Eparchy of Saint John XXIII of Sofia
- in Croatia:
  - Archdiocese of Zadar
  - Military Ordinariate of Croatia, not vested in any see
- in the Czech Republic:
  - Ruthenian Apostolic Exarchate of Czech Republic
- in and for all Denmark, including its overseas territories Greenland and the Faroe Islands: Diocese of Copenhagen
- in and for all Estonia: Diocese of Tallinn
- Finland, including the autonomous region of Åland: Diocese of Helsinki
- in France:
  - Military Ordinariate of France
  - Archdiocese of Strasbourg
  - Diocese of Metz
  - Ordinariate for Eastern Catholics in France, vested in the Metropolitan Archbishop of capital Paris, for remaining Eastern Churches
- in Germany
  - Military Ordinariate of Germany, cumulated with varying sees
  - Apostolic Exarchate in Germany and Scandinavia for the Ukrainians, with cathedral see in Munich (Bavaria); also for Nordic countries: Denmark, Finland, Norway and Sweden
- in and for all Gibraltar: Diocese of Gibraltar
- in Greece:
  - Archdiocese of Athens
  - Archdiocese of Rhodos
  - Archdiocese of Corfu, Zakynthos and Cephalonia, on the Ionian Islands
  - Apostolic Vicariate of Thessaloniki
  - Ordinariate for Armenian Catholics in Greece
  - Greek Catholic Apostolic Exarchate of Greece, with cathedral see in Athens, for the Greek Catholic particular Eastern church
- in Hungary:
  - Military Ordinariate of Hungary, not vested in any see
  - Territorial Abbacy of Pannonhalma, whose abbatial cathedral see is a minor basilica
- in and for all Iceland: Diocese of Reykjavík
- in Italy:
  - some (arch)bishoprics under the papal Metropolitan see at Rome, including
  - Military Ordinariate of Italy, cumulated with varying sees
  - Archdiocese of Lucca
  - Territorial Abbey of Montecassino, whose cathedral see is a minor basilica
  - Territorial Abbacy of Monte Oliveto Maggiore, with cathedral see in Siena, seat of the abbot-general of the Olivetans (a Benedictine congregation)
  - formerly the Territorial Abbey of San Paolo fuori le Mura (since 2005, just an abbey, territory incorporated into the diocese of Rome)
  - Territorial Abbacy of Subiaco, whose cathedral see and co-cathedral are minor basilicas
  - Italo-Albanese Territorial Abbacy of Santa Maria di Grottaferrata, only non-Latin Church territorial abbey: Italo-Albanese Catholic rite
  - Italo-Albanese Diocese of Piana degli Albanesi, with cathedral see at Palermo, on Sicily
  - Italo-Albanese Diocese of Lungro, with cathedral see at Lungro, near Cosenza in Calabria
- in Kosovo:
  - Diocese of Prizren-Priština, for all Kosovo
  - cfr. Serbia for the Catholics of Byzantine Rite
- in and for all the principality of Liechtenstein: Archdiocese of Vaduz
- in Lithuania: Military Ordinariate of Lithuania
- in and for all the Grand duchy of Luxemburg: Archdiocese of Luxembourg
- in and for all Moldova (Moldavia): Diocese of Chişinău
- in and for all the principality of Monaco: Archdiocese of Monaco
- in Montenegro: Archdiocese of Bar
- in the Netherlands: Military Ordinariate of the Netherlands, cumulated with varying sees
- in North Macedonia: Macedonian Catholic Eparchy of the Assumption of the Blessed Virgin Mary in Strumica-Skopje
- in Norway:
  - Diocese of Oslo for most of Norway
  - Territorial Prelature of Trondheim
  - Territorial Prelature of Tromsø
- in Poland:
  - Ordinariate for Eastern Catholics in Poland, for all Eastern Churches, vested in the Metropolitan Archbishop of capital Warszaw
  - Military Ordinariate of Poland
- in Portugal: Military Ordinariate of Portugal, not vested in any see
- in Romania:
  - Archdiocese of Alba Iulia
  - Ordinariate for Armenian Catholics in Romania
- in Russia (cfr. infra Eastern Europe & Asia):
  - Russian Catholic Apostolic Exarchate of Russia, vacant since 1951
- in Sweden: Diocese of Stockholm
- in Serbia: Byzantine Catholic Eparchy of Saint Nicholas of Ruski Krstur, for Catholics of Byzantine Rite in Serbia
- Military Ordinariate of Slovakia, not vested in any see
- Military Ordinariate of Spain, ranking as archbishop, cumulated with varying sees
- in Switzerland, all diocesan sees (joined in a national episcopal conference, without province):
  - Diocese of Basel
  - Diocese of Chur
  - Diocese of Lausanne, Geneva and Fribourg
  - Diocese of Lugano
  - Diocese of Sankt Gallen
  - Diocese of Sion (Sitten)
  - Territorial Abbacy of Maria Einsiedeln
  - Territorial Abbacy of Saint-Maurice d’Agaune
- in the UK:
  - Military Ordinariate of Great-Britain for UK-based troops, being joint for both UK provinces (England & Wales and Scotland)
  - Personal Ordinariate of Our Lady of Walsingham (for former Anglicans in England and Wales and in Scotland)
  - Syro-Malabar Catholic Eparchy of Great Britain (England, Scotland & Wales)
- Ordinariate for Armenian Catholics in Eastern Europe, actually only for Armenia, Georgia, Russia and Ukraine
- in Ukraine: Mukachevo(Munkách) Ruthenian Greek-Catholic Eparchy

=== Asian exempt dioceses ===
- Latin Patriarchate of Jerusalem, for all of the Holy Land (Palestine & Israel), Jordan and Cyprus
- Apostolic Vicariate of Aleppo, for all of Syria
- Apostolic Vicariate of Beirut, for all of Lebanon
- Apostolic Vicariate of Northern Arabia, in Kuwait City, for all of Kuwait, Bahrain, Saudi Arabia and Qatar
- Apostolic Vicariate of Southern Arabia, in Abu Dhabi, for all of Oman, United Arab Emirates and Yemen
- Archdiocese of Baghdad, covering Iraq
- Apostolic Vicariate of Brunei Darussalam, covering Brunei
- all dioceses in Cambodia (joined in a common episcopal conference with Laos):
  - Apostolic Vicariate of Phnom Penh
  - Apostolic Prefecture of Battambang
  - Apostolic Prefecture of Kompong Cham
- in China:
  - Diocese of Macau
  - Apostolic Prefecture of Baoqing (Paoking/ Shaoyang)
  - Apostolic Prefecture of Guilin (Kweilin)
  - Apostolic Prefecture of Hainan
  - Apostolic Prefecture of Haizhou (Donghai/ Haichow)
  - Apostolic Prefecture of Jiamusi (Kiamusze)
  - Apostolic Prefecture of Jian’ou (Jianning/ Kienning/ Kienow)
  - Apostolic Prefecture of Lindong (Lintung)
  - Apostolic Prefecture of Linqing (Lintsing)
  - Apostolic Prefecture of Lixian (Lizhou/ Lichow)
  - Apostolic Prefecture of Qiqihar (Tsitsikar)
  - Apostolic Prefecture of Shaowu
  - Apostolic Prefecture of Shashi (Shasi)
  - Apostolic Prefecture of Shiqian (Shihtsien)
  - Apostolic Prefecture of Suixian (Suihsien)
  - Apostolic Prefecture of Tongzhou (Tungchow)
  - Apostolic Prefecture of Tunxi (Tunki)
  - Apostolic Prefecture of Weihai (Weihaiwei)
  - Apostolic Prefecture of Xiangtan (Siangtan)
  - Apostolic Prefecture of Xing’anfu (Ankang/Hinganfu)
  - Apostolic Prefecture of Xining (Sining)
  - Apostolic Prefecture of Xinjiang (Jiangzhou/Kiangchow)
  - Apostolic Prefecture of Xinjiang-Urumqi (Urumqi/Sinkiang/Xinjiang)
  - Apostolic Prefecture of Xinxiang (Sinsiang)
  - Apostolic Prefecture of Yangzhou (Yangchow)
  - Apostolic Prefecture of Yiduxian (Iduhsien)
  - Apostolic Prefecture of Yixian (Yihsien)
  - Apostolic Prefecture of Yongzhou (Lingling/Yungchow)
  - Apostolic Prefecture of Yueyang (Yuezhou/Yochow)
  - Apostolic Prefecture of Zhaotong (Chaotung)
  - Russian Catholic Apostolic Exarchate of Harbin, with former cathedral see in Harbin
- in India:
  - Syro-Malankara Catholic Eparchy of Gurgaon, see located near Delhi, serving 22 states of India
- in Indonesia: Military Ordinariate of Indonesia
- in and for all Iran (Persia): Archdiocese of Teheran-Isfahan
- Personal Ordinariate of Our Lady of the Southern Cross (for former Anglicans in Australia and Japan).
- in Korea (North and South):
  - Military Ordinariate of South Korea
  - Territorial Abbacy of Tŏkwon, alias Tŏkugen abbey, with a cathedral see, in North Korea
- all dioceses in Laos (joined in a common episcopal conference with Cambodia):
  - Apostolic Vicariate of Luang Prabang
  - Apostolic Vicariate of Pakse
  - Apostolic Vicariate of Savannakhet
  - Apostolic Vicariate of Vientiane
- in the Philippines:
  - Military Ordinariate of the Philippines
  - Apostolic Vicariate of Bontoc-Lagawe
  - Apostolic Vicariate of Calapan
  - Apostolic Vicariate of Jolo
  - Apostolic Vicariate of Puerto Princesa
  - Apostolic Vicariate of San Jose in Mindoro
  - Apostolic Vicariate of Tabuk
  - Apostolic Vicariate of Taytay
- in Pakistan: Apostolic Vicariate of Quetta
- in Russia (cfr. Europe): Apostolic Prefecture of Yuzhno Sakhalinsk, on Sakhalin island off eastern Siberia
- in and for all Singapore: Archdiocese of Singapore
- in Turkey:
  - Greek Catholic Apostolic Exarchate of Istanbul, with see in Istanbul, for all Turkey

=== New World exempt dioceses ===
- in Argentina:
  - Military Ordinariate of Argentina
  - Ordinariate for Eastern Catholics in Argentina, for all Eastern Churches, vested in the Latin Church Metropolitan Archbishop of capital Buenos Aires
- in Australia:
  - Military Ordinariate of Australia
  - Archdiocese of Canberra and Goulburn
  - Archdiocese of Hobart
  - Personal Ordinariate of Our Lady of the Southern Cross (for former Anglicans in Australia and Japan, with cathedral see in Melbourne, Australia).
- in Bolivia:
  - Military Ordinariate of Bolivia
  - Apostolic Vicariate of Camiri
  - Apostolic Vicariate of El Beni
  - Apostolic Vicariate of Ñuflo de Chávez
  - Apostolic Vicariate of Pando
  - Apostolic Vicariate of Reyes
- in Brazil:
  - Military Ordinariate of Brazil
  - Ordinariate for Eastern Catholics in Brazil, for all Eastern Churches, cumulated with various Latin Church Metropolitan sees
  - Personal Apostolic Administration of São João Maria Vianney, cumulated with Diocese of Campos
- in Canada:
  - Military Ordinariate of Canada
  - Archdiocese of Winnipeg
  - Syriac Catholic Apostolic Exarchate of Canada (Antiochian Rite), with cathedral see at Montréal, Québec
- in Chile:
  - Military Ordinariate of Chile
  - Apostolic Vicariate of Aysén
- in Colombia:
  - Military Ordinariate of Colombia
  - Apostolic Vicariate of Guapi
  - Apostolic Vicariate of Inírida
  - Apostolic Vicariate of Leticia
  - Apostolic Vicariate of Mitú
  - Apostolic Vicariate of Puerto Carreño
  - Apostolic Vicariate of Puerto Leguízamo–Solano
  - Apostolic Vicariate of Puerto Carreño
  - Apostolic Vicariate of San Andrés y Providencia
  - Apostolic Vicariate of San Vicente del Caguán
  - Apostolic Vicariate of Tierradentro
  - Apostolic Vicariate of Trinidad
- in Dominican Republic: Military Ordinariate of Dominican Republic
- in Ecuador:
  - Military Ordinariate of Ecuador
  - Apostolic Vicariate of Aguarico
  - Apostolic Vicariate of Esmeraldas
  - Apostolic Vicariate of Galápagos
  - Apostolic Vicariate of Méndez
  - Apostolic Vicariate of Napo
  - Apostolic Vicariate of Puyo
  - Apostolic Vicariate of San Miguel de Sucumbíos
  - Apostolic Vicariate of Zamora in Ecuador
- in El Salvador: Military Ordinariate of El Salvador
- Apostolic Prefecture of Falkland Islands, for the Southern Atlantic UK overseas territories Falkland Islands (Malvinas) and South Georgia and the South Sandwich Islands
- in New Zealand: Military Ordinariate of New Zealand
- in Paraguay:
  - Military Ordinariate of Paraguay
  - Apostolic Vicariate of Chaco Paraguayo
  - Apostolic Vicariate of Pilcomayo
- in Peru:
  - Military Ordinariate of Peru
  - Apostolic Vicariate of Iquitos
  - Apostolic Vicariate of Jaén in Peru
  - Apostolic Vicariate of Pucallpa
  - Apostolic Vicariate of Puerto Maldonado
  - Apostolic Vicariate of Requena
  - Apostolic Vicariate of San José de Amazonas
  - Apostolic Vicariate of San Ramón
  - Apostolic Vicariate of Yurimaguas
- in Tonga:
  - Diocese of Tonga
- in the United States:
  - Military Ordinariate of the United States: Archdiocese for the Military Services, USA
  - Personal Ordinariate of the Chair of Saint Peter, with see in Houston, Texas (for former Anglicans in the United States and in Canada)
  - Romanian Catholic Eparchy of St George's in Canton, bishopric for the diaspora in North America (also Canada), with cathedral see in Canton, Ohio
  - Syro-Malankara Catholic Eparchy of St. Mary, Queen of Peace, of the United States of America and Canada, with cathedral see at Elmont, New York
- in Venezuela:
  - Military Ordinariate of Venezuela
  - Apostolic Vicariate of Caroní
  - Apostolic Vicariate of Puerto Ayacucho
  - Apostolic Vicariate of Tucupita
  - Melkite Greek Catholic Apostolic Exarchate of Venezuela (Byzantine Rite), with cathedral see in Caracas
  - Syriac Catholic Apostolic Exarchate of Venezuela (Antiochian Rite), with cathedral see at Maracay, Aragua

=== African exempt dioceses ===
- in Algeria: Diocese of Laghouat
- in Chad: Apostolic Vicariate of Mongo
- in Cape Verde:
  - Diocese of Mindelo
  - Diocese of Santiago de Cabo Verde
- in and for all the Comoros, also for Mayotte: Apostolic Vicariate of Comoros Archipelago
- in and for all Djibouti: Diocese of Djibouti
- in Ethiopia, where all Latin circonscriptions are missionary:
  - Apostolic Vicariate of Awasa
  - Apostolic Vicariate of Gambella
  - Apostolic Vicariate of Harar
  - Apostolic Vicariate of Hosanna
  - Apostolic Vicariate of Jimma-Bonga, at Jimma
  - Apostolic Vicariate of Meki
  - Apostolic Vicariate of Nekemte
  - Apostolic Vicariate of Soddo
  - Apostolic Prefecture of Robe
- in Gabon: Apostolic Vicariate of Makokou
- in and for all The Gambia: Diocese of Banjul
- in Guinea-Bissau:
  - Diocese of Bafatá
  - Diocese of Bissau
- in Kenya:
  - Military Ordinariate of Kenya
  - Apostolic Vicariate of Isiolo
- in Libya:
  - Apostolic Vicariate of Benghazi
  - Apostolic Vicariate of Derna
  - Apostolic Vicariate of Tripoli

== Bibliography ==
- Atlas de las Diócesis de Italia, published by the Italian Episcopal Conference and the Istituto Geografico De Agostini, Rome, 2000.
- Decreto Christus Dominus
