= Joseph Li Hongguang =

- Bishop of the Prefecture Apostolic of Xinjiang
- Church: Cathedral of the Immaculate Heart of Mary in Xinjiang
- Diocese: Prefecture Apostolic of Xinjiang
- Installed: 16 July 2006
- Term ended: 13 December 2006
- Predecessor: Augustin Zheng Shouduo
- Successor: Peter Wu Junwei

Orders
- Ordination: 1953

Personal details
- Born: 15 July 1926 Lucheng County, Shanxi, China
- Died: 13 December 2006 (aged 80) Xinjiang County, Shanxi, China
- Denomination: Roman Catholic
- Education: Beijing Wensheng Seminary

Joseph Li Hongguang (Chinese: 李宏光; pinyin: Lǐ Hóngguāng; 15 July 1926 – 13 December 2006) was a Chinese Catholic priest and bishop of the Prefecture Apostolic of Xinjiang in 2006.

== Biography ==
Li was born in Lucheng County (now Lucheng District, Changzhi), Shanxi, on 15 July 1926. He graduated from Changzhi Seminary, Taiyuan General Seminary, and Beijing Wensheng Seminary. He was ordained a priest on 21 March 1953.

During the Cultural Revolution, Li was imprisoned for 15 years and suffered from pain in his feet because of wearing shackles for a long time. He was released after the Cultural Revolution. Li continued his missionary work and worked as an English teacher in a middle school.

In 1994, he was transferred to the Prefecture Apostolic of Xinjiang as coadjutor bishop. On 14 May 1996, he was elected Bishop of the Prefecture Apostolic of Xinjiang, which was recognized by Pope John Paul II. On 16 July 2006, Bishop Augustin Zheng Shouduo died, and him took over as the vicar of the Prefecture Apostolic of Xinjiang. However, on the afternoon of December 13 of the same year, he died of a heart attack at the age of 80.

Catholic Church titles
Preceded by Augustin Zheng Shouduo	Bishop of the Prefecture Apostolic of Xinjiang; 2006	Succeeded by Peter Wu Junwei
