= Gazireh =

Gazireh may refer to:

- Gazireh (Turkey), a city in Turkey and
  - former Chaldean Catholic diocese Gazireh of the Chaldeans
  - former Syrian Catholic diocese Gazireh of the Syrians
  - former Latin Missio sui iuris of Gazireh
- Gezir(eh), in Iran
