= Yixian =

Yixian may refer to:

== Places in China ==
- Yi County, Anhui, in Huangshan city
- Yi County, Hebei, in Baoding city
- Yi County, Liaoning, in Jinzhou city
  - Yixian Formation, geological formation in Jinzhou, Liaoning Province, named for the county
- the Latin Catholic Apostolic Prefecture of Yixian, near Beijing and Baoding
- Yi County, Shandong, now Yicheng District, Zaozhuang

== People ==
- Empress Yixian, Liang Nüying (died 159), Chinese empress during the Han dynasty
- Sun Yixian, better known as Sun Yat-sen (1866–1925), Chinese revolutionary and statesman
