= Sebela =

Ancient city and bishopric in Asia Minor

Sebela was an Ancient city and bishopric in Asia Minor and remains a Latin Catholic titular see.

== History ==
Sebela, identified with modern Kestelyalasi in present Anatolia (Asian Turkey), was among the cities in the Roman province of Isauria of enough importance to become a suffragan diocese of the Archdiocese of Seleucia in the sway of the Patriarchate of Antioch, yet destined to fade.

The see is named in the Byzantine imperial Notitiae Episcopatuum from the 7th till the 10th century. Its only historically documented bishop, Leo(n) or Leontius, participated according to Jean Darrouzès in the Second Council of Nicaea in 787; Lequien however assigns him to the see off Psibela in Lycaonia.

== Titular see ==
The diocese was nominally restored in 1933 as Latin Titular bishopric of Sebela (Latin = Curiate Italian) / Sebelien(sis) (Latin adjective).

It is vacant since decades, having has had the following incumbents, so far of the fitting Episcopal (lowest) rank :

- Louis-Prosper Durand (杜安坤), Friars Minor (O.F.M.) (born Canada) (1938.06.14 – 1946.04.11) as last Apostolic Vicar of Zhifou 芝罘 (China) (1938.06.14 – 1946.04.11); later (see) promoted first Bishop of Yantai 煙台 (China) (1946.04.11 – 1950.01.20), emeritate as Titular Bishop of Girus (1950.01.20 – death 1972.08.07); previously Apostolic Prefect of Weihai 威海 (China) (1932.01.29 – 1938.06.14)
- Joseph Rodgers (1948.01.10 – 1955.10.29) as Coadjutor Bishop of Killaloe (Ireland) (1948.01.10 – 1955.10.29); later succeeded as Bishop of Killaloe (1955.10.29 – death 1966.07.09)
- Pierre Kimbondo (1956.08.09 – 1961.06.24) as Auxiliary Bishop of Diocese of Kisantu (Congo-Kinshasa) (1956.08.09 – 1961.06.24); later succeeded as Bishop of Kisantu (Congo-Kinshasa) (1961.06.24 – 1973.04.27), emeritate 'promoted' Archbishop ad personam (1971.11.08 – ?resigned 1973.04.27), died 1977
- Oddo Bernacchia (1962.03.19 – death 1964.11.13) as emeritate; previously Bishop of Larino (Italy) (1924.06.24 – 1960), Bishop of Termoli (Italy) (1924.10.28 – 1962.03.19).

== Sources and external links ==
- GCatholic

Bibliography

- Michel Lequien Oriens Christianus
- Jean Darrouzès, Listes épiscopales du concile de Nicée (787), in Revue des études byzantines, 33 (1975), pp. 51 & 53
