= Immaculate Conception Cathedral, Ürümqi =

Immaculate Conception Cathedral
- 无染原罪圣母主教座堂; Urumqi Catholic Church
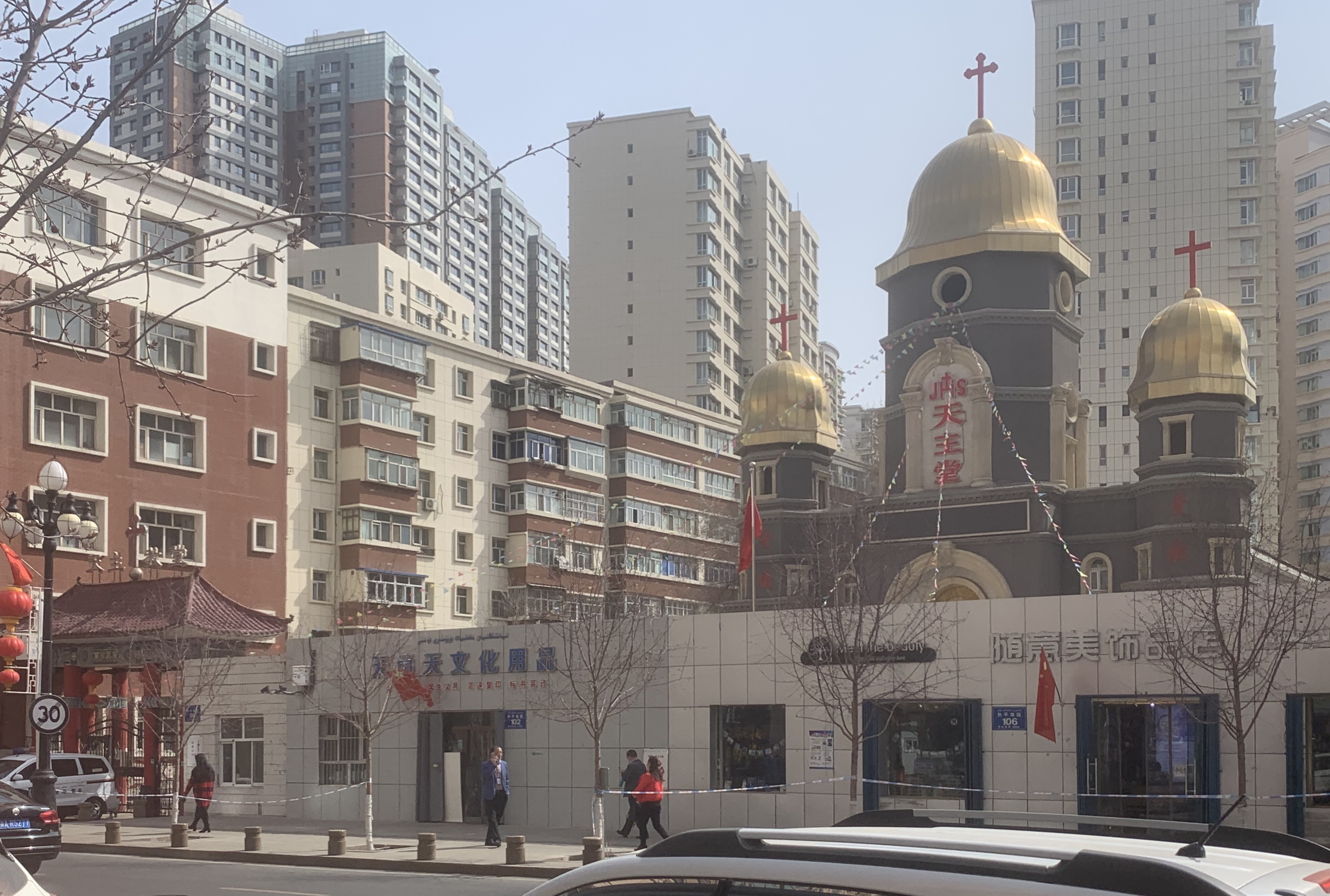
- Immaculate Conception Cathedral
- 43.7882°N 87.6216°E
- Location: Ürümqi
- Country: China
- Denomination: Roman Catholic Church

The Immaculate Conception Cathedral (Chinese: 无染原罪圣母主教座堂) also called Ürümqi Cathedral is a religious building located in the city of Ürümqi (Urumchi), capital of the Xinjiang Autonomous Region, in the northwest part of China.

The temple follows the Roman or Latin rite and is the mother and main church of the apostolic prefecture of Sinkiang (Praefectura Apostolica Sinkiangensis, 天主教新疆监牧区) which was created as a mission sui juris by the apostolic brief Decet Romanum Pontificem by the Pope Pius XI in 1930 and obtained its current status in 1938.

It is under the pastoral responsibility of Bishop Paul Xie Ting-zhe (謝庭哲).

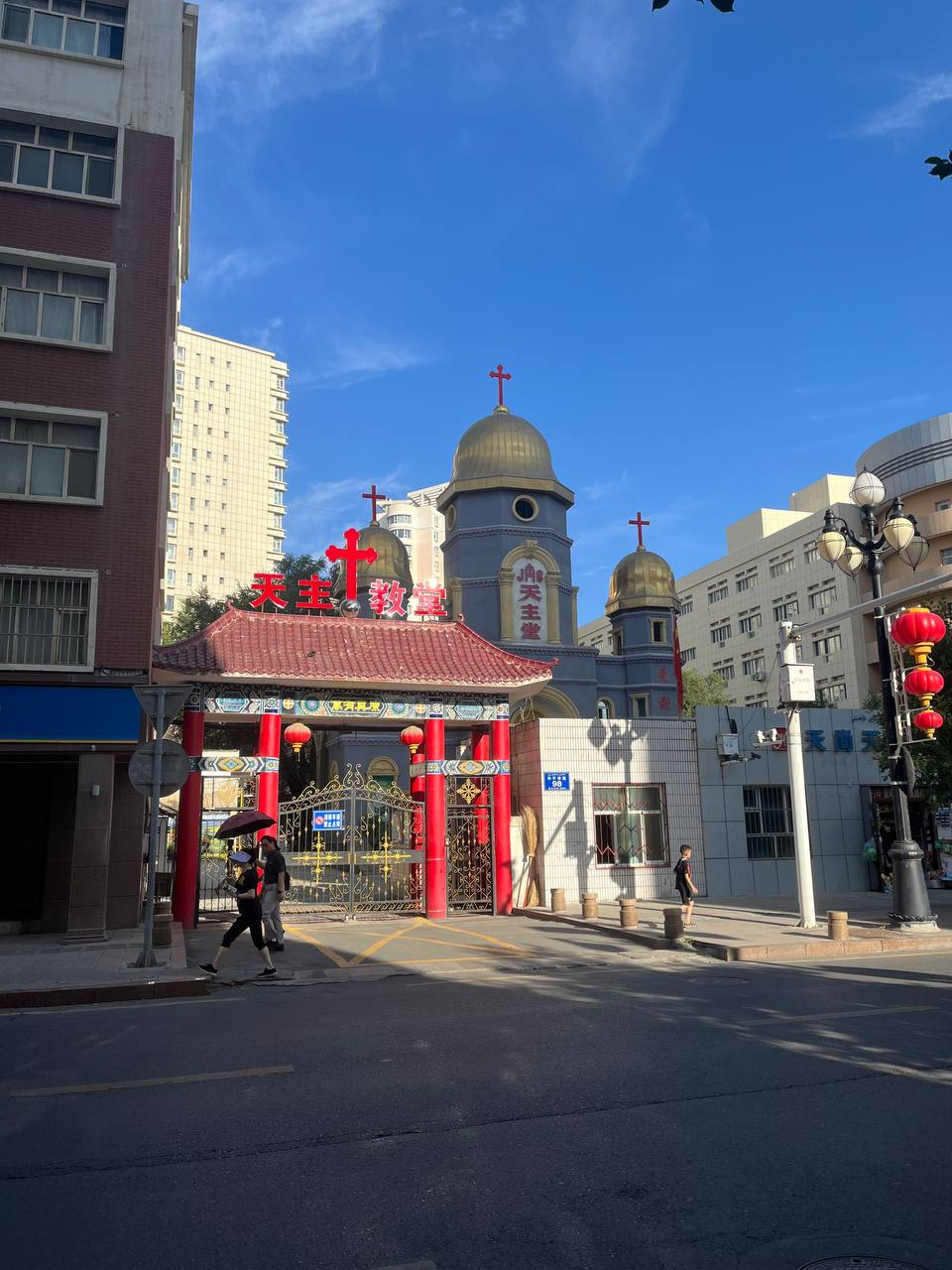
Immaculate Conception cathedral in Urumqi, Xinjiang province

== See also ==
- Apostolic Prefecture of Xinjiang-Urumqi
