= Apostolic Prefecture of Weihai =

Catholic missionary jurisdiction in China

The Apostolic Prefecture of Weihai is a Latin Catholic pre-diocesan jurisdiction based in the port city of Weihai, Shandong province, northeastern China.

It is exempt, i.e., directly dependent on the Holy See and its missionary Roman Congregation for the Evangelization of Peoples.

== History ==
The positions was established on 1931.06.18 as Mission sui juris of Weihai 威海 (中文) / Weihaiwei 威海衛 (中文) / Veihaiveien(sis) (Latin adjective), on territory split off from the then Apostolic Vicariate of Zhifou 芝罘 (meanwhile a Diocese) In 1938 it was promoted as Apostolic Prefecture of Weihai 威海 (中文) / Weihaiwei 威海衛 (中文) / Veihaiveien(sis) (Latin). It has remained vacant without an apostolic administrator (dormant) since 1970.

== Ordinaries ==
(all Latin Rite and Western members of a missionary Latin congregation)

=== Ecclesiastical Superior(s?) of Weihai mission sui iuris ===
- not available

=== Apostolic Prefects of Weihai 威海 ===
- Father Louis-Prosper Durand (杜安坤), Friars Minor (O.F.M.) (born Canada) (1932.01.29 – 1938.06.14), later Titular Bishop of Sebela (1938.06.14 – 1946.04.11) as Apostolic Vicar of Zhifou 芝罘 (China) (1938.06.14 – 1946.04.11), Bishop of Yantai 煙台 (China) (1946.04.11 – retired 1950.01.20), emeritate as Titular Bishop of Girus (1950.01.20 – death 1972.08.07)
- Fr. Cesario Stern (路道宣), O.F.M. (1939.06.02 – retired 1949.03.28), died 1957
- Fr. Edward Gabriel Quint (甘霖), O.F.M. (1950.01.27 – retired 1970), died 1994
- Long vacancy

== See also ==
- List of Catholic dioceses in China

== Sources and external links ==
- GCatholic - data for all sections
