= Matthias Gu Zheng =

Chinese bishop

Matthias Gu Zheng, S.J.
- Prefect Apostolic of Xining
- Province: Qinghai
- Diocese: Apostolic Prefecture of Xining
- Installed: 1991
- Predecessor: Hyeronimus Haberstroh

Orders
- Ordination: 30 July 1982
- Consecration: 11 September 1991 by Bishop Paul Li Zhenrong, S.J.

Personal details
- Born: February 17, 1937 (age 89)
- Denomination: Roman Catholic

Matthias Gu Zheng (simplified Chinese: 顾征; traditional Chinese: 顧征; pinyin: Gù Zhēng; born 17 February 1937) is a Chinese Catholic priest and Bishop of the Apostolic Prefecture of Xining since 1991.

Catholic Church titles
Previous: Hyeronimus Haberstroh	Bishop of the Apostolic Prefecture of Xining; 1991	Incumbent
