= Tarcisio Martina =

Italian Catholic prelate (1887–1961)

The Reverend Monsignor Tarcisio Martina C.S.S.
- Apostolic Prefect of Yixian
- Church: Catholic Church
- Diocese: Yixian

Orders
- Ordination: 1907
- Consecration: 1936

Personal details
- Born: 17 September 1887 Gemona, Italy
- Died: 12 November 1961 (aged 74) Verona, Italy

Tarcisio Martina C.S.S. (17 September 1887 – 12 November 1961), known in Chinese as Ma Dinuo (馬迪懦), was an Italian Catholic prelate. He was first the apostolic prefect of Yixian, (Note: Also romanized as "Yihsien".) then a representative of the Holy See in China. Because of his alleged involvement in the Tian'anmen Mortar Plot, he was sentenced to life imprisonment by China in 1951 and expelled from the country in 1954.

== Biography ==
Tarcisio Martina was born in Gemona on 17 September 1887. He entered the Stigmatine seminary in Verona in 1899 and was ordained a priest on 10 October 1907. (Note: According to the 1940 Lazarist annual Les Missions de Chine, Martina entered the Stigmatine seminary in Verona in 1903 and was ordained a priest in 1907.) He served in the military from 1908 to 1910, reaching the rank of second lieutenant. Then he studied at the Pontifical Roman Athenaeum Saint Apollinare and received a diploma in sacred theology in July 1911. He then taught theology at the diocesan seminary of Belluno, but was recalled to the army as an officer in 1915, where he joined the Arditi in 1917. During the war, he won three Silver Medals of Military Valor, and was made a knight of the Order of Leopold (Belgium).

In 1923 he headed the parish of the Holy Cross at Acquabella near Milan. In 1925 he was chosen, with other priests, to establish the first Stigmatine mission in China. He arrived in China in January 1926. In 1929, he was appointed the superior of the independent mission in Yixian, Hebei. When the Apostolic Prefecture of Yixian was created in 1936, he became its first apostolic prefect.

During the Second Sino-Japanese War, the invading Japanese forces controlled the Catholic mission in Yixian in 1937. Martina was also kidnapped by communist forces in June 1945 and detained for 40 days. Later, after the Japanese withdrew, the communist forces took over Yixian. Martina eventually decided to abandon the mission and move to Beijing, where he established a minor seminary.

After the Chinese Civil War, the Apostolic Nunciature to China moved to Taiwan, but Martina remained as the sole representative of the Holy See in mainland China, in place of the nuncio Antonio Riberi. The Chinese government accused Martina of being involved with Antonio Riva in the Tian'anmen Mortar Plot, a conspiracy to kill Mao Zedong and other PRC officials by firing a mortar at the Tian'anmen during the National Day parade on 1 October 1950. He was held in Beijing, and was sentenced to life imprisonment. Time magazine called him "the first Catholic clergyman to be sentenced to life in prison" by China. His ankles were chained for four months at the beginning of his imprisonment. In May 1952, he was assigned to make matchboxes. He was released on 26 December 1954 and expelled to British Hong Kong. He returned to Italy on 26 January 1955, retired in Verona, and died there on 12 November 1961.

== See also ==
- Paul Yu Pin, Cardinal archbishop of Nanjing, expelled to Taiwan in 1949
- Ignatius Kung Pin-mei, bishop of Shanghai, imprisoned 1955–1986
- Dominic Tang, apostolic administrator of Guangzhou, imprisoned 1958–1980
- David D. Barrett, U.S. Army officer in Beijing, also implicated in the Tian'anmen Mortar Plot and expelled
