= Tangshan Teacher's College =

College in Hebei, China

Tangshan Teachers' College (simplified Chinese: 唐山师范学院; traditional Chinese: 唐山師範學院; pinyin: Tángshān Shīfàn Xuéyuàn) is a college in Qingyuan, Baoding, Hebei, China under the provincial government.

The college was established in 1954 under the name Tangshan Normal School (Chinese: 唐山师范专科学校). It underwent a merger with Tangshan Education College (Chinese: 唐山教育学院) in 1984. After the Ministry of Education allowed the educational institution to become an undergraduate normal college in 2000, it was renamed to Tangshan Teachers' College (Chinese: 唐山师范学院). The Ministry of Education in 2014 named the college as among the nation's top 50 higher educational institutions for graduate job placement.

The college's property occupies an area of 262,546 square metres (64.877 acres), while the building occupies an area of 108,856 square metres (26.899 acres). The building has 17 stories.
