= Wu Yishun =

Peter Wu Yishun
- Bishop of Shaowu
- Native name: 吳奕順
- Church: Catholic Church
- See: Apostolic Prefecture of Shaowu
- Appointed: 16 December 2023
- Predecessor: Inigo Maximilian König

Orders
- Ordination: 15 August 1992
- Consecration: 31 January 2024 by Joseph Li Shan

Personal details
- Born: 7 December 1964 (age 61) Ningde, Fujian, China

Peter Wu Yishun (吴奕顺) is the current bishop of the Apostolic Prefecture of Shaowu in Fujian, China.

Wu Yishun was born on December 7, 1964. He studied at Sheshan Seminary in Shanghai and was ordained to the priesthood on August 15th, 1992. He served in the Diocese of Xiamen and as a parish priest in the city of Nanping. He became head of the Apostolic Prefecture of Shaowu and the Apostolic Prefecture of Jian'ou.

In January 2024, he was consecrated as bishop for Shaowu. His principal consecrator was Bishop Joseph Li Shan of the Archdiocese of Beijing. The Vatican reported that he was consecrated within the Sino-Vatican agreement.

In 2021, prior to his episcopal consecration, Wu Yishun spoke in favour of the government's policy to sinicize the Catholic church in China.
