= Joseph Wei Jingyi =

Chinese priest (born 1958)

- Bishop of the Apostolic Prefecture of Qiqihar
- Province: Heilongjiang
- Diocese: Apostolic Prefecture of Qiqihar
- Installed: 2000
- Predecessor: Paul Guo Wen-zhi

Orders
- Ordination: 1985

Personal details
- Born: May 1958 (age 68) Qingyuan County, Hebei, China
- Denomination: Roman Catholic

Chinese name
- Traditional Chinese: 魏景義
- Simplified Chinese: 魏景义
Transcriptions
Standard Mandarin
- Hanyu Pinyin: Wèi Jǐngyì

Joseph Wei Jingyi (Chinese: 魏景义; born May 1958) is a Chinese Catholic priest and the current bishop of the Apostolic Prefecture of Qiqihar since 2000.

== Biography ==
Wei was born in Qingyuan County, Hebei, in May 1958, to a Catholic family. During the three years of natural disasters, his family moved to Shulan County, Jilin Province. After high school in 1976, he became a worker and two years later became a salesperson in a supply and marketing cooperative. In 1983 he was accepted to Jilin Seminary. He was ordained a priest in 1985. He began to spread Catholicism in Heilongjiang in 1986. On December 7, 1987, he was arrested by the local government for printing Catholic publications. A few months later he was released. On September 21, 1990, he was arrested and imprisoned for attending underground Roman Catholic church. He was released after reeducation through labour. In January 1994 he was arrested by the Xushui County Public Security Bureau in Hebei province. On June 22, 1995, he was elected Coadjutor bishop of the Apostolic Prefecture of Qiqihar. On August 1, 2000, he was elected Bishop of Apostolic Prefecture of Qiqihar. In 2002 he was received by Pope John Paul II in the Vatican City. In October 2005, Pope Benedict XVI invited four Chinese bishops to attend the World Bishop Conference in Rome, including Joseph Wei Jingyi.

Catholic Church titles
Previous: Paul Guo Wenzhi	Bishop of the Apostolic Prefecture of Qiqihar; 2000	Incumbent
