= Mission sui iuris of Syria and Cilicia =

Former Latin Catholic jurisdiction in the Ottoman Empire

The Mission sui iuris of Syria and Cilicia (also the Apostolic Prefecture of Syria and Cilicia from 1817 to 1896) was a Latin Church pre-diocesan missionary jurisdiction of the Catholic Church in the regions of Syria, Iraq and, initially, Anatolia.

== History ==
- Established in 1628 as Mission sui juris of Syria and Cilicia, on Ottoman territories in the Ancient regions of (As) Syria and Cilicia, without formal predecessor jurisdiction.
- Promoted in 1817 as Apostolic Prefecture of Syria and Cilicia.
- Lost on 1842.08.30 its territory in present Turkey to establish the Apostolic Prefecture of Mardin.
- Demoted in 1896, back to Mission sui juris of Syria and Cilicia.
- Suppressed in 1953, without formal successor jurisdiction.

== Ordinaries ==
(all Latin Church missionaries)

Ecclesiastical Superiors of Syria and Cilicia
first incumbents unavailable

Apostolic Prefects of Syria and Cilicia

- Father Angelico da Loreto (1817 – 1829)
- Francesco da Ploaghe (1829 – 1834)
- Modesto da Onano (1834 – 1841)
- Giuseppe da Genova (1841 – 1844)
- Emanuele della Croce (1883 – 1896)

Ecclesiastical Superiors of Syria and Cilicia

- Marcellino da Vallarsa (1896 – 1902)
- Girolamo da Lione, Capuchin Friars Minor (O.F.M. Cap.) (1903.03.07 – death 1946)

== See also ==
- List of Catholic dioceses in Syria
