= Psibela =

Town of ancient Lycaonia

Psibela was a town of ancient Lycaonia, inhabited in Roman and Byzantine times. It was renamed Verinopolis at some point between 457 and 479. It became a bishopric; no longer the seat of a residential bishop, it remains a titular see of the Roman Catholic Church.

Its site is unlocated, although Sir William Ramsay suggests a similarity with Sibyla, which is located in modern Yıldızköy.
