= Cathedral of the Immaculate Heart of Mary, Datong =

- 大同圣母圣心堂
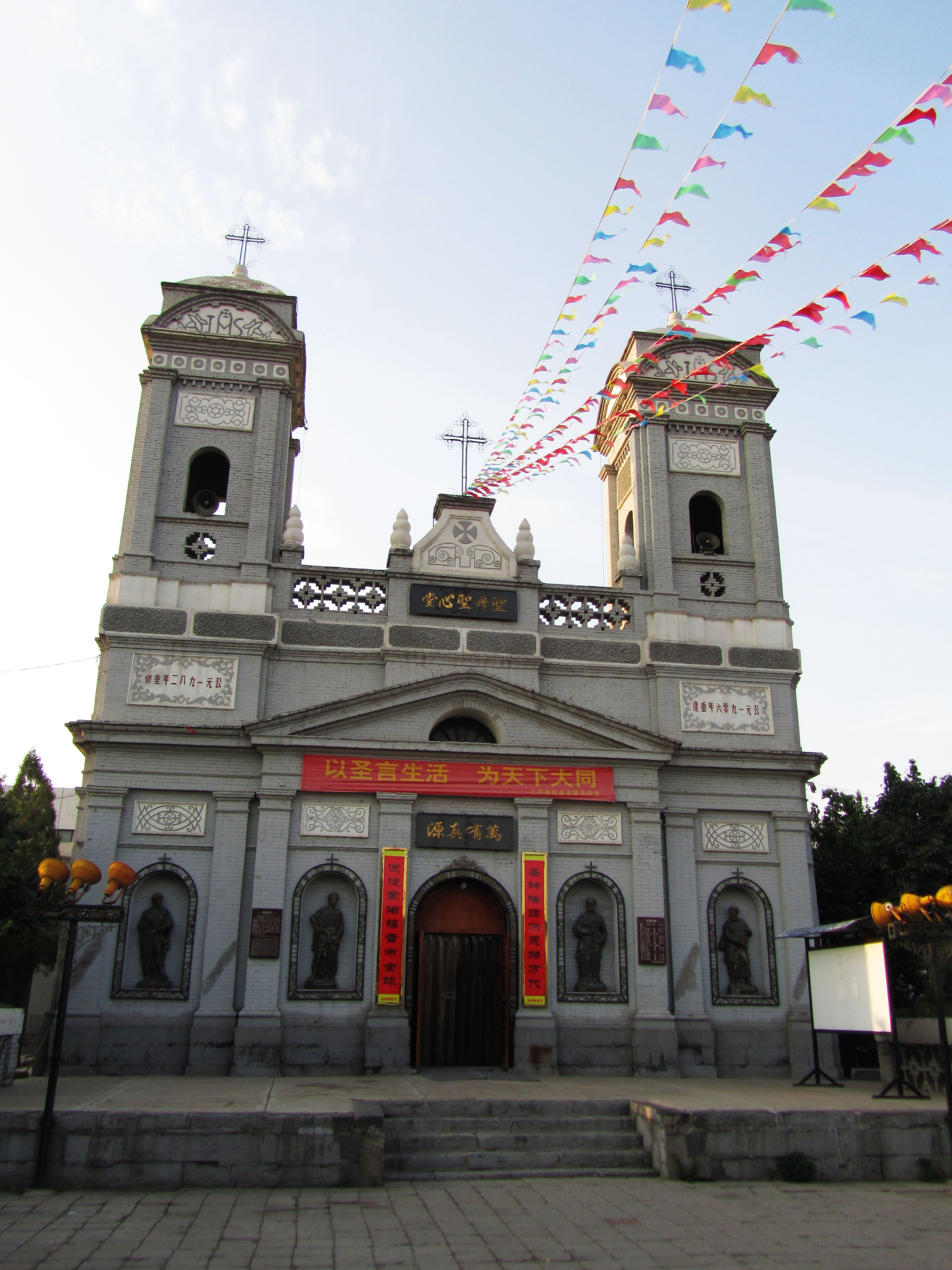
- Cathedral of the Immaculate Heart of Mary in 2011

- Location in Shanxi
- 40°05′30″N 113°18′00″E
- Location: Datong, Shanxi, China
- Denomination: Roman Catholic

History
- Status: Parish church
- Founded: 1889

Architecture
- Functional status: Active
- Architectural type: Church building
- Style: Neoclassical architecture
- Completed: 1906 (reconstruction)
- Demolished: 1900

Specifications
- Materials: Granite

Administration
- Diocese: Roman Catholic Diocese of Datong

Chinese name
- Simplified Chinese: 大同圣母圣心堂
- Traditional Chinese: 大同聖母聖心堂
Transcriptions
Standard Mandarin
- Hanyu Pinyin: Dàtóng Shèngmǔ Shèngxīn Táng

Cathedral of the Immaculate Heart of Mary, Datong (Chinese: 大同圣母圣心堂) is a Roman Catholic cathedral located in Datong, Shanxi, China.

== History ==
Construction of the Cathedral of the Immaculate Heart of Mary, designed by Franciscan missionaries from Italy, commenced in 1889 and was completed in 1891. It was burned by a catastrophic fire in 1900 during the Boxer Uprising, causing many casualties in the Christian community in the area. It was restored in 1906 in a neoclassical architecture style.

The Roman Catholic Diocese of Datong was set up in 1922 and came under the leadership of the CICM Missionaries.

During the Cultural Revolution, the church was severely damaged by the Red Guards, while Christians were hunted by the Communists. Both bell towers collapsed. And the church was used as a workshop. It underwent two renovations, respectively in 1982 and 2006. Two 17-metre (56 ft) high bell towers were added to the church.
