= Diocese of Datong =

Roman Catholic diocese in China

Diocese of Datong Dioecesis Tatomensis 天主教大同教区
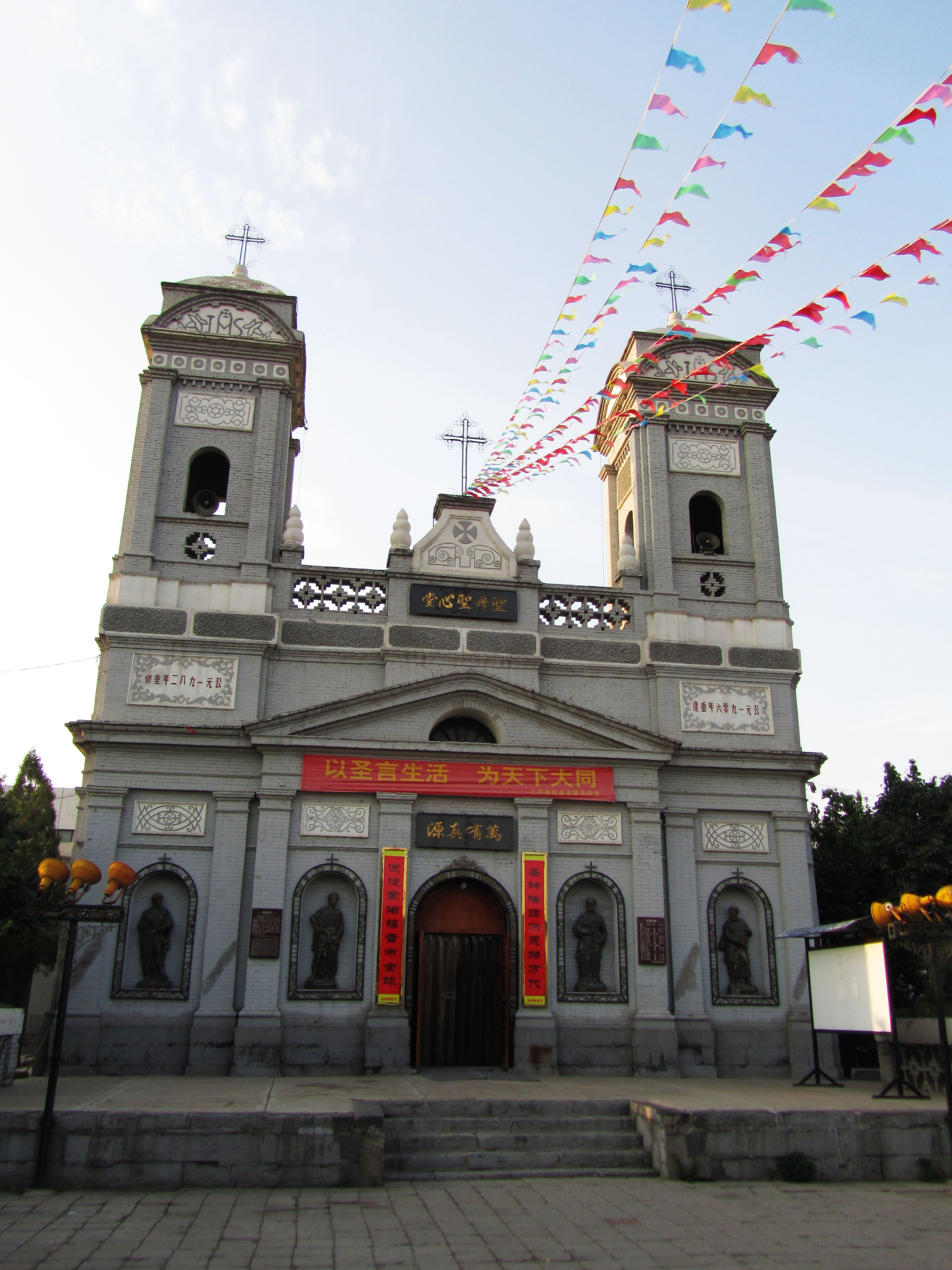
- Cathedral of the Immaculate Heart of Mary

Location
- Country: China
- Ecclesiastical province: Taiyuan
- Metropolitan: Taiyuan

Statistics
- Area: 20,000 km^{2} (7,700 sq mi)
- Population: Total; Catholics: (as of 1950); 1,000,000; 7,702 (0.8%)

Information
- Rite: Latin Rite
- Cathedral: Cathedral of the Immaculate Heart of Mary, Datong

Current leadership
- Pope: Leo XIV
- Bishop: Paul Liu Honggang

The Roman Catholic Diocese of Datong/Tatung (Latin: Tatomen(sis), Chinese: 大同) is a Latin diocese in the ecclesiastical province of Taiyuan in PR China.

It has its cathedral episcopal see Cathedral of the Immaculate Heart of Mary in the city of Datong (Shanxi) but is vacant.

== History ==
- Established on March 14, 1922, as Apostolic Prefecture of Datongfu 大同府, on territory split off from the Apostolic Vicariate of Northern Shansi 山西北境)
- Promoted on June 17, 1932, as Apostolic Vicariate of Datongfu 大同府
- Promoted on April 11, 1946, as Diocese of Datong 大同, ceasing to be exempt and becoming a suffragan.

== Ordinaries ==
(all Roman Rite; so far all missionary members of the Latin congregation Scheutists, C.I.C.M.)

Apostolic Prefect of Datongfu 大同府

- Father Joseph Hoogers, C.I.C.M. (March 3, 1923 – 1932), previously Ecclesiastical Superior of the Mission sui iuris of I-li 伊犁 (imperial China) (1918.06.08 – 1922)

Apostolic Vicar of Datongfu 大同府

- Franciscus Joosten, C.I.C.M. (June 21, 1932 – April 11, 1946 see below), Titular Bishop of Germanicopolis (in Isauria) (1932.06.14 – 1946.04.11)

Suffragan Bishops of Datong 大同

- Franciscus Joosten, C.I.C.M. (see above April 11, 1946 – 1947)
- Apostolic Administrator Alphonse Van Buggenhout (范普厚), C.I.C.M. (1950.03.31 – 1951), later Secretary General of the Chinese Regional Bishops’ Conference 1967 – 1970
- Thaddeus Guo Yin-gong (郭印宮) (1990 – 2000?)
- Paul Liu Honggang (since 10 August 2026)

== Source and External links ==
- GigaCatholic with incumbent biography links
