= Joseph Yue Fusheng =

Roman Catholic bishop

Joseph Yue Fusheng (Chinese: 岳福生; born April 1964 in Hebei) is the current Roman Catholic bishop of Harbin, China.

== Biography ==
Joseph Yue Fusheng on 7 August 1988 was ordained priest. On May 16, 2012, he was named Bishop of Harbin by the Catholic Patriotic Association. Yue received his episcopal ordination on July 6 of the same year and was excommunicated latae sententiae.

On September 22, 2018, Pope Francis lifted the excommunication of Yue and other six bishops previously appointed by the Chinese government without a mandate.
