= Beiwangli Township =

Beiwangli Township 北王力乡
- Rural Township
- Běiwánglì Xiāng
- Location in Hebei Location in China
- Coordinates: 38°35′31″N 115°22′41″E
- Country: People's Republic of China
- Province: Hebei
- Prefecture-level city: Baoding
- District: Qingyuan

Area
  - Total: 46.37 km^{2} (17.90 sq mi)

Population (2010)
  - Total: 26,034
  - Density: 561.4/km^{2} (1,454/sq mi)
- Time zone: UTC+8 (China Standard)

Beiwangli Township (Chinese: 北王力乡; pinyin: Běiwánglì Xiāng) is a rural township located in Qingyuan District, Baoding, Hebei, China. According to the 2010 census, Beiwangli Township had a population of 26,034, including 13,172 males and 12,862 females. The population was distributed as follows: 3,639 people aged under 14, 19,880 people aged between 15 and 64, and 2,515 people aged over 65.

== See also ==
- List of township-level divisions of Hebei
