= John Baptist Ye Ronghua =

Chinese Roman Catholic prelate (1931–2022)

His Excellency John Baptist Ye Ronghua
- Administrator of Xing'anfu
- Appointed: 1987
- Term ended: 28 August 2022
- Predecessor: Pietro Maleddu
- Successor: John Wang Xiaoxun

Orders
- Ordination: 10 December 1981 by Casimir Wang Milu
- Consecration: 10 December 2000 by Anthony Li Duan

Personal details
- Born: 19 June 1931 Shankou, Shaanxi, China
- Died: 28 August 2022 (aged 91) Xing'anfu, China

John Baptist Ye Ronghua (19 June 1931 – 28 August 2022) was a Chinese Roman Catholic prelate.

Ye Ronghua was born in China and was ordained to the priesthood in 1981. He served as the bishop of the Apostolic Prefecture of Xing'anfu from 2000 until his death in 2022.

Catholic Church titles
Preceded by Pietro Maleddu	Administrator of Xing'anfu; 1987–2022	Succeeded by John Wang Xiaoxun
