= Paul Xie Ting-zhe =

Chinese bishop

- Bishop of Xinjiang-Urumqi
- Native name: 謝廷哲
- Church: Catholic Church
- See: Apostolic Prefecture of Xinjiang-Urumqi
- In office: 25 November 1991 – 14 August 2017
- Predecessor: Ferdinand Loy
- Successor: Sede vacante

Orders
- Ordination: 25 February 1979 by Anthony Zhou Weidao
- Consecration: 25 November 1991 by Lucas Li Jing-feng

Personal details
- Born: 1931 Lanzhou, Gansu, Republic of China
- Died: 14 August 2017 (aged 85–86) Ürümqi, Xinjiang, China
- Coat of arms

Paul Xie Ting-zhe (1931 – 14 August 2017) was a Roman Catholic bishop.

Xie Ting-zhe was ordained to the priesthood in 1980. He was ordained a bishop clandestinely in 1991 and served as bishop for the Apostolic Prefecture of Xinjiang, China, until his death.
