= Apostolic Prefecture of Hainan =

Catholic missionary jurisdiction in China

Coordinates: 20°00′N 110°18′E

The Apostolic Prefecture of Hainan is a pre-diocesan missionary Latin jurisdiction of the Catholic Church covering the Chinese province of Hainan, which is exempt, i.e. directly dependent on the Holy See and its missionary Roman Congregation for the Evangelization of Peoples, not part of any ecclesiastical province.

Its episcopal see is the Cathedral of the Sacred Heart of Jesus, located in Haikou, the capital of the province.

The apostolic prefecture has been vacant, i.e. without a prefect, since 1980.

== History ==
- Established on 15 April 1929 as Mission sui juris of Hainan 海南 out of the Apostolic Vicariate of Guangzhou (now the Archdiocese of Guangzhou).
- Promoted on 25 May 1936 as Apostolic Prefecture of Hainan 海南.

== See also ==
- List of Catholic dioceses in China

== Sources and external links ==
- GCathholic, with Google satellite photo - data for all sections, accessed 18 April 2017
