= Paul Guo Wenzhi =

Chinese bishop (1918–2006)

- Bishop of the Apostolic Prefecture of Qiqihar
- Church: Cathedral of St. Michael
- Province: Heilongjiang
- Diocese: Apostolic Prefecture of Qiqihar
- Installed: 1989
- Term ended: 2000
- Predecessor: Paul Hugentobler
- Successor: Joseph Wei Jingyi

Orders
- Ordination: 1948

Personal details
- Born: January 11, 1918 Qiqihar, Heilongjiang, China
- Died: June 29, 2006 (aged 88) Qiqihar, Heilongjiang, China
- Denomination: Roman Catholic

Paul Guo Wenzhi (Chinese: 郭文治; pinyin: Guō Wénzhì; 11 January 1918 - 29 June 2006) was a Chinese Catholic priest and Bishop of the Apostolic Prefecture of Qiqihar between 1989 and 2006.

== Biography ==
Guo was born into a Catholic family in Qiqihar, Heilongjiang on January 11, 1918. He entered seminars in Changchun and Beijing in 1940 and 1946, respectively. He was ordained a priest in December 1948. In 1950 he became diocesan administrator, and two years later he was arrested. In 1954, he was charged with "counter-revolutionary" crimes and sentenced to 10 years in prison. He spent eight years in captivity in Heilongjiang and was then sent for 3 years in labor reform in Beijing and another 14 years in Xinjiang. After his release in 1979, he taught English at a secondary school in Xinjiang. He returned to Qiqihar in 1985. After attending the founding meeting of the bishop's conference in November 1989, Guo was arrested by the Communist government and held captive from December 1989 to January 1990. In 1993 he established a priesthood seminary and restored a nunnery in the diocese. He retired in 2000, his coadjutor Joseph Wei Jingyi succeeded. He died of heart failure in Meilisi Catholic Church.

Catholic Church titles
Previous: Paul Hugentobler	Bishop of the Apostolic Prefecture of Qiqihar; 1989–2000	Next: Joseph Wei Jingyi
