= Beidian Township =

Beidian Township 北店乡
- Rural Township
- Běidiàn Xiāng
- Location in Hebei Location in China
- Coordinates: 38°41′57″N 115°28′21″E
- Country: People's Republic of China
- Province: Hebei
- Prefecture-level city: Baoding
- District: Qingyuan

Area
  - Total: 44.55 km^{2} (17.20 sq mi)

Population (2010)
  - Total: 24,757
  - Density: 555.7/km^{2} (1,439/sq mi)
- Time zone: UTC+8 (China Standard)

Beidian Township (Chinese: 北店乡; pinyin: Běidiàn Xiāng) is a rural township located in Qingyuan District, Baoding, Hebei, China. According to the 2010 census, Beidian Township had a population of 24,757, including 12,663 males and 12,094 females. The population was distributed as follows: 4,276 people aged under 14, 18,195 people aged between 15 and 64, and 2,286 people aged over 65.

== See also ==
- List of township-level divisions of Hebei
