= Liu Huanqi =

- 刘焕岐
- Born: 1928; Qingyuan County, Hebei, China
- Died: 2014 (aged 85–86); Jinan, Shandong, China
- Military career
- Allegiance: Chinese Communist Party; People's Republic of China
- Branch: People's Liberation Army Air Force
- Rank: Lieutenant general
- Commands: Vice Chief of Staff of Jinan Military Region; Deputy Commander of Jinan Military Region Air Force
- Conflicts: Korean War
- Awards: Order of Liberation (1955); Order of Victory (1988)

Liu Huanqi (simplified Chinese: 刘焕岐; traditional Chinese: 劉煥岐; pinyin: Liú Huànqí; 1928 - 2014) was a military officer in the People's Liberation Army Air Force of China. He was awarded the rank of lieutenant general in 1988.

== Biography ==
Born in Qingyuan County, Hebei in 1928, Liu Huanqi joined the People's Liberation Army in 1946, and he joined the Chinese Communist Party (CCP) the following year. After graduating from PLA Air Force Aviation University in 1951 he took part in the Korean War, the CCP government commissioned him as battalion chief of PVA Air Force Flight Brigade. He shot down two American F-86s. After war he held various positions in the PLA Air Force, including vice chief of staff of Jinan Military Region and deputy commander of its Air Force. Liu died of an illness in Jinan, Shandong, on November 4, 2014.
