= Peter Wu Junwei =

Chinese Catholic Bishop (1963–2022)

- Bishop of the Prefecture Apostolic of Xinjiang
- Province: Shanxi
- Diocese: Roman Catholic Diocese of Xinjiang
- Installed: 21 September 2010
- Term ended: 10 May 2022
- Predecessor: Joseph Li Hongguang
- Successor: TBA

Orders
- Ordination: 9 December 1990 by Zhang Xin
- Consecration: 21 September 2010 by John Huo Cheng

Personal details
- Born: 27 June 1963 Taiyuan, Shanxi, China
- Died: 10 May 2022 (aged 58) Xinjiang County, Shanxi, China
- Denomination: Roman Catholic
- Education: Shanxi Seminary
- Coat of arms

Chinese name
- Traditional Chinese: 武俊維
- Simplified Chinese: 武俊维
Transcriptions
Standard Mandarin
- Hanyu Pinyin: Wú Jùnwéi

Peter Wu Junwei (Chinese: 武俊维; 27 June 1963 – 10 May 2022) was a Chinese Catholic prelate and bishop of the Prefecture Apostolic of Xinjiang from 2010 until his death in 2022.

== Biography ==
Wu was born in Taiyuan, Shanxi, on 27 June 1963. After high school in July 1981, he was accepted to Jiangzhou Seminary. In March 1985 he entered the Shanxi Seminary.

He was ordained a priest by Zhang Xin (Chinese: 张信) on 9 December 1990. In August 2001 he was appointed president of the Shanxi Seminary, a position he held until August 2009.

On 8 September 2009, he was elected Bishop of the Prefecture Apostolic of Xinjiang, which was recognized by the Chinese Government and the Holy See. He accepted the episcopacy with the papal mandate on 21 September 2010.

Catholic Church titles
Previous: Joseph Li Hongguang	Bishop of the Prefecture Apostolic of Xinjiang; 2010–2022	Vacant
