= Apostolic Prefecture of Xining =

Catholic missionary jurisdiction in China

Apostolic Prefecture of Xining Praefectura Apostolica Siningensis 天主教西寧監牧區
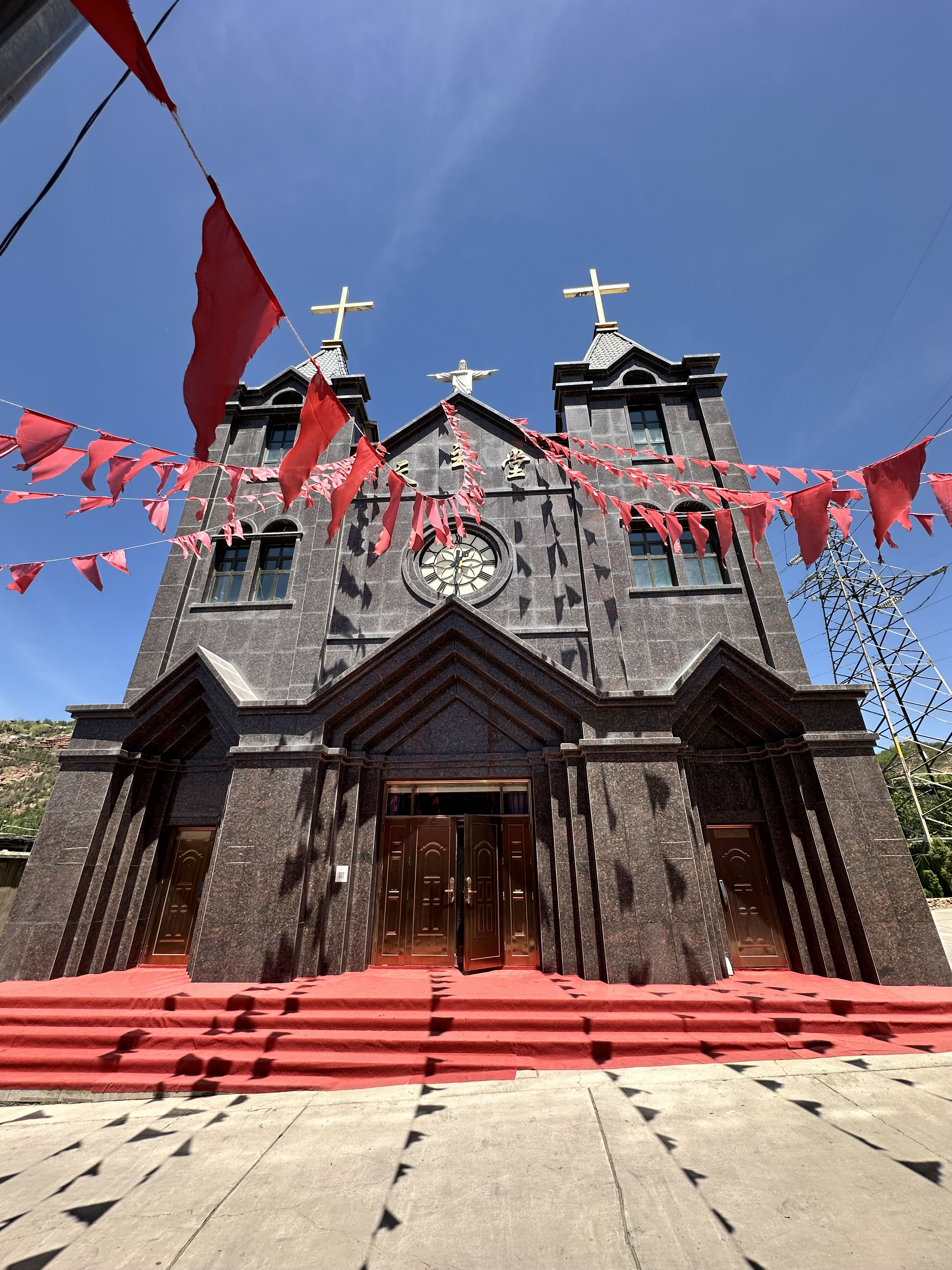

Location
- Country: China
- Headquarters: Xining, Qinghai, China

Information
- Denomination: Catholic Church
- Sui iuris church: Latin Church
- Rite: Roman Rite
- Established: 4 February 1937; 89 years ago

Current leadership
- Pope: Leo XIV
- Bishop: Matthias Gu Zheng, S.J.

The Apostolic Prefecture of Xining is a Latin Catholic pre-diocesan jurisdiction in western China covering the province of Qinghai.

It is exempt, i.e. depends directly on the Holy See and its missionary Roman Congregation for the Evangelization of Peoples.

No statistics available. It borders on the Apostolic Prefecture of Xinjiang to the northwest, Archdiocese of Lanzhou to the north and east, and Diocese of Kangding to the south and southwest.

It may be vacant by demise, if so without apostolic administrator.

== History ==
Established on 4 February 1937 as Apostolic Prefecture of Xining / Sining / Siningen(sis) (Latin adjective), on territory split off from the then Apostolic Vicariate of Lanchowfu.

== Leadership ==
(all Roman Rite)

=== Prefect of Xining ===
- Hieronymus Haberstroh, S.V.D. (12 November 1937 – 13 August 1969)

=== Bishop of Xining ===
- Matthias Gu Zheng, S.J. (11 September 1991 – Present)

== See also ==
- Christianity in Qinghai
- List of Catholic dioceses in China

== Sources and external links ==
- GCatholic, with Google map - data for all sections
