= Apostolic Administration of Harbin =

Catholic apostolic administration in northeast China

Coordinates: 45.7500°N 126.6330°E

The Apostolic Administration of Harbin (哈爾濱 or 中文) is a Latin Church pre-diocesan jurisdiction of the Catholic Church in Manchuria, China.

It is exempt directly to the Holy See and its Roman Congregation for the Evangelization of Peoples.

Its cathedral is the Cathedral of the Sacred Heart of Jesus, in Harbin, Heilongjiang province, PR China.

== History ==
It was established on 28 May 1931 as Apostolic Administration of Harbin, on territory split off from the Apostolic Vicariate of Siberia (Czarist Russian empire).

Initially the Holy See only nominated Italians from the papal diplomacy, but from 2011 it has its native incumbent.

However, from 1959, an "alternative" line of the national church without papal mandate was set up by the PRC.

== Ordinaries ==
Apostolic Administrators of Harbin 哈爾濱

- Celso Benigno Luigi Costantini (剛恆毅) (1931.05.28 – 1933.11.03), previously Apostolic Administrator of Rijeka (Croatia) (1920.04.30 – 1921.07.21) and Titular Bishop of Hierapolis (1921.07.22 – 1922.09.09), then Apostolic Delegate (papal diplomatic envoy) to China (1922.08.12 – 1933.11.03) and Titular Archbishop of Theodosiopolis in Arcadia (1922.09.09 – 1953.01.12), Founder of Congregation of the Disciples of the Lord (1931.03.31); later Secretary of Sacred Congregation of the Propagation of the Faith (1935.12.20 – retired 1953.01.12), created Cardinal-Priest of Ss. Nereo ed Achilleo (1953.01.15 – 1958.06.09), Chancellor of Apostolic Chancery (1954.05.22 – 1958.10.17), cardinal title transferred to Cardinal-Priest of S. Lorenzo in Damaso (1958.06.09 – death 1958.10.17)
- Mario Zanin (蔡寧) (1934.01.07 – 1946), Titular Archbishop of Trajanopolis in Rhodope (1933.11.28 – death 1958.08.04), later as Apostolic Delegate to China (1934.01.07 – 1946), Apostolic Nuncio (papal ambassador) to Chile (1947.03.21 – 1953.02.07), Apostolic Nuncio to Argentina (1953.02.07 – death 1958.08.04)
- Joseph Yue Fusheng (2012.07.06), first native (since September 22, 2018 recognized by Vatican).

== Sources and external links ==
- GCatholic, with Google map and satellite photo
