= Diocese of Yizhou =

Roman Catholic diocese in China

Diocese of Yizhou Dioecesis Iceuvensis 天主教沂州教区

Location
- Country: China
- Ecclesiastical province: Jinan
- Metropolitan: Jinan

Statistics
- Area: 18,000 km^{2} (6,900 sq mi)
- Population: Total; Catholics: (as of 1950); 3,600,000; 20,545 (0.6%)

Information
- Rite: Latin Rite
- Cathedral: Cathedral in Linyi

Current leadership
- Pope: Leo XIV
- Bishop: John Fang Xingyao
- Metropolitan Archbishop: Joseph Zhang Xianwang

The Roman Catholic Diocese of Yizhou/Ichow/Linyi (Latin: Iceuven(sis), Chinese: 沂州, 臨沂) is a Latin suffragan diocese in the ecclesiastical province of the Metropolitan of Jinan in PR China.

Its episcopal seat is located in the city of Linyi, Shandong.

== History ==
- July 1, 1937: Established as the Apostolic Vicariate of Yizhoufu 沂州府, on territory split off from the then Apostolic Vicariate of Qingdao 青島
- Promoted on April 11, 1946 as Diocese of Yizhou 沂州, ceasing to be an exempt pre-diocesan missionary jurisdiction.

== Ordinaries ==
(all Roman Rite)

Apostolic Vicar of Yizhoufu 沂州府

- Charles Weber, Divine Word Missionaries (S.V.D.) (December 2, 1937 – April 11, 1946), Titular Bishop of Daldis (1937.12.02 – 1946.04.11)

Suffragan Bishops of Yizhou 沂州

- Bishop Charles Weber, (S.V.D.) (see above April 11, 1946 – August 7, 1970)
- Bishop John Fang Xing-yao (1997–present); also Apostolic Administrator of Yantai 煙台 (China) (2012.02.15 – ... not possessed)

== Sources and external links ==
- GCatholic.org, with incumbent biography links
- Catholic Hierarchy
