= Diocese of Yantai =

Roman Catholic diocese in China

Diocese of Yantai Dioecesis Ientaevensis 天主教烟台教区

Location
- Country: China
- Ecclesiastical province: Jinan
- Metropolitan: Jinan

Statistics
- Population: Total; Catholics: (as of 1950); 4,000,000; 2,072 (0.1%)

Information
- Rite: Latin Rite

Current leadership
- Pope: Leo XIV
- Bishop: Sede Vacante

The Roman Catholic Diocese of Yantai/ Chefoo/ Zhifou/ Yentai (Latin: Ientaeven(sis), Chinese: 煙台, 芝罘) is a diocese in the ecclesiastical province of Jinan in eastern China, yet depends on the missionary Roman Congregation for the Evangelization of Peoples.

Its episcopal seat is in the city of Yantai (Shandong). No statistics are available.

== History ==
- Established on February 22, 1894 as Apostolic Vicariate of Eastern Shantung 山東東境, on territory split off from the Apostolic Vicariate of Northern Shantung 山東北境
- December 3, 1924: renamed as Apostolic Vicariate of Zhifou 芝罘
- Lost territory twice : on 1931.06.16 to establish the Apostolic Prefecture of Yiduxian 益都縣and on 1931.06.18 to establish Mission sui juris of Weihai 威海
- Promoted on April 11, 1946 as Diocese of Yantai 煙台

== Episcopal ordinaries ==
(all Roman Rite)

Apostolic Vicars of Eastern Shantung 山東東境

- Césaire Shang, Friars Minor (O.F.M.) (May 6, 1894 – death September 9, 1911), Titular Bishop of Vaga (1894.05.22 – 1911.09.09)
- Adéodat-Jean-Roch Wittner, O.F.M. (September 9, 1911 – 3 December 1924), Titular Bishop of Miletus (1907.04.28 – 1936.12.01), succeeding as former Coadjutor Apostolic Vicar of Eastern Shantung 山東東境 (China) (1907.04.28 – 1911.09.09)

Apostolic Vicars of Zhifou 芝罘

- Adéodat-Jean-Roch Wittner, O.F.M. (3 December 1924 – death 1 December 1936)
- Louis Prosper Durand, O.F.M. (14 June 1938 – 11 April 1946), Titular Bishop of Sebela (1938.06.14 – 1946.04.11 see below)

Suffragan Bishops of Yantai 煙台

- Louis Prosper Durand, O.F.M. (see above April 11, 1946 – retired January 20, 1950), emeritate as Titular Bishop of Girus (1950.01.20 – death 1972.08.07)
- Alphonsus Zong Huai-mo, O.F.M. (宗懷謨) (June 14, 1951 – death 1978)
- Zhang Ri-jin (張日進) (1960 – death 1970?▼) no papal mandate
- Apostolic Administrator John Gao Ke-xian (高可賢) (1997 – death 2005.01.24) while (clandestine) Bishop of Zhoucun 周村 (China) (1993 – 2005.01.24)
- (Apostolic Administrator 2012.02.15 – ... not possessed) John Fang Xing-yao (房興耀) while Bishop of Yizhou 沂州 (China) (1997 – ...)

== See also ==
- List of Catholic dioceses in China

== Sources and external links ==
- GCatholic.org, with Google map - data for all section
- Catholic Hierarchy
