= Mission sui juris of I-li =

Catholic mission sui iuris in China

The Mission sui juris of I-li was a pre-diocesan Latin Church ecclesiastical jurisdiction or mission sui iuris of the Catholic Church in Mongol-imperial China, notably in (mostly Muslim) East Turkestan.

== History ==
- In 1320, the jurisdiction has been established as Diocese of Ili-baluc, alias Almaliq, alias Kuldja, on pagan territory split off from the Archdiocese of Khanbalik 汗八里, in the Great Khan's Mongol-Chinese capital; no incumbent available, but it was suppressed in 1330.
- Modern missions in the region, now known as Xinjiang (= Sinkiang), were mounted by the Scheutists from their neighboring Apostolic Vicariate of Kansu (now Archdiocese of Lanzhou), under its authority.
- On 1 October 1888, the Ili see was restored, albeit demoted as lowest-ranking pre-diocesan missionary jurisdiction: Mission sui juris of I-li 伊犁, alias Kuldja, alias Yining 伊寧.
- It was again suppressed on 8 March 1922 by Pius XI's papal brief (breve) Apostolatus officium, incorporating its territory in the Apostolic Vicariate of Western Kansu (the former Kansu; two year later renamed Lanchowfu).

Heritage

However its territory would soon see a new missionary see, the present Apostolic Prefecture of Xinjiang-Urumqi, confided to the Divine Word Missionaries on 14 February 1930 as Mission sui juris of Xinjiang.

== Ordinaries ==
It has had only three Ecclesiastical Superiors, all members of the Scheutists (C.I.C.M.), from the Low Countries :

- Daniel Bernard van Koot, C.I.C.M. (1888–1893)
- Jan Baptist Steeneman, C.I.C.M. (Dutch; 1898 – death 1918)
- Joseph Hoogers (高東升), C.I.C.M. (Belgian; 1918.06.08 – 1922), later Apostolic Prefect of Datongfu 大同府 (China) (1923.03.03 – 1931.09.28).

== Sources ==
- GigaCatholic

Bibliography

- Joseph de Moidrey, La hiérarchie catholique en Chine, en Corée et au Japon (1307–1914), Shanghai 1914, p. 94.
- Breve Decet Romanum Pontificem, AAS 22 (1930), p. 478.
