= Mission sui iuris of Gazireh =

The Missio(n) sui iuris of Gazireh was a short-lived (1935-53) Latin Catholic missionary pre-diocesan jurisdiction sui iuris in part of Asian Turkey, based on the Ancient city and former see of Gazireh.

== History ==
Established in 1935 as Mission sui juris of Gazireh (Gezira), exempt, i.e. directly dependent on the Holy See, not part of any ecclesiastical province.

Suppressed in 1953, having had a single recorded incumbent as Ecclesiastical Superior of Gazireh :

- Father Francesco Drapier, Dominican Order (O.P.) (1935 – 1941)

== See also ==
Eastern Catholic dioceses

- Gazireh of the Chaldeans
- Gazireh of the Syrians
