= Christianity in Qinghai =

Christianity is a minority religion in the Chinese province of Qinghai. According to Asia Harvest, estimates from 2020 suggest that of the entire population (6,430,483) about 3.40% is Christian (218,361).

== Overview ==
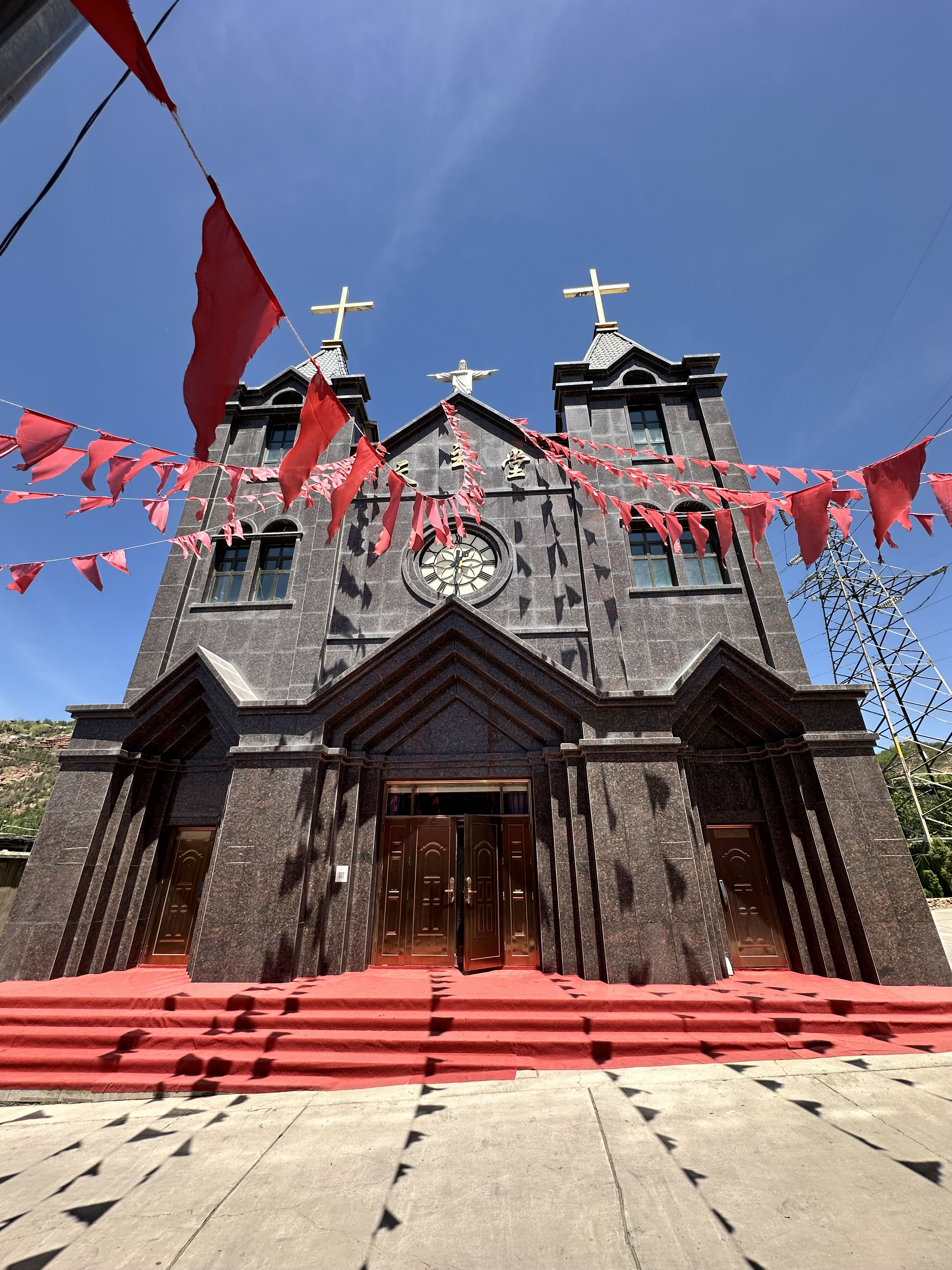
A Catholic church in Xining

Christianity in Xining is a major proportion of Christianity in Qinghai. An Apostolic Prefecture of Xining of the Roman Catholic Church exists. Most Christians in the province are Protestants. Most Protestants are house church Christians. Xining has Qinghai Provincial Protestant Christian Training Centre. The number of members of the major church in the capital of the province increased from 800 in 1992 to 7000 in 1997. Most Eastern Khampa are not Christians. The province had 400 Christians in the 1940s. Gansu is an area with persecution of Christians. Many Christians were sent to internal exile in Qinghai. The churches in the province include Datong County Church, Guide County Church, Huangyuan County Church and Longyang Gorge Church. Amity Foundation distributed relief after the major earthquake.

== See also ==
- Mentuhui
- Christianity in Qinghai's neighbouring provinces
  - Christianity in Sichuan
  - Christianity in Tibet
  - Christianity in Xinjiang
