= Sibyla =

Town of ancient Cilicia

Coordinates: 36°42′48″N 33°27′58″E

Sibyla was a town of ancient Cilicia, inhabited in Byzantine times.

Its site is located near Yıldız, Asiatic Turkey.
