= Qingyuan, Baoding =

Qingyuan 清苑区 Tsingyuan
- District
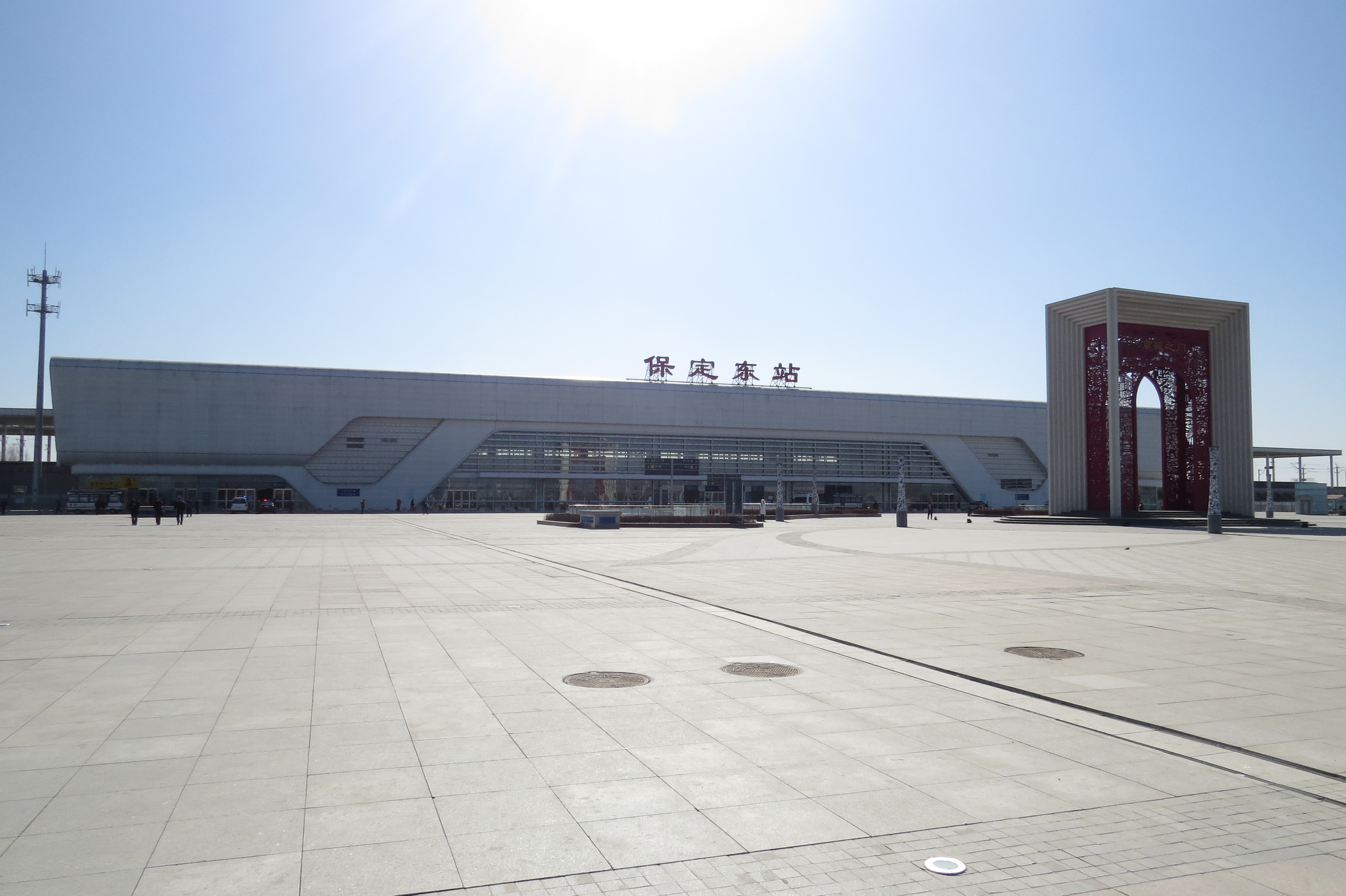
- Baoding East railway station

- Location in Hebei
- Coordinates: 38°45′54″N 115°29′24″E
- Country: People's Republic of China
- Province: Hebei
- Prefecture-level city: Baoding
- County seat: Qingyuan Town (清苑镇)

Area
  - Total: 953 km^{2} (368 sq mi)
- Elevation: 17 m (56 ft)

Population (2020 census)
  - Total: 625,246
  - Density: 656/km^{2} (1,700/sq mi)
- Time zone: UTC+8 (China Standard)
- Postal code: 071100

Qingyuan (Chinese: 清苑; pinyin: Qīngyuàn) is a district of the city of Baoding, in the central part of Hebei province, China, covering part of the southern and eastern suburbs of Baoding. As of 2020, it has a total population of 625,246 residing in an area of 953 km^{2} (368 sq mi).

== Administrative divisions ==
There are 13 towns and 5 townships under the county's administration.

Towns:

- Qingyuan (清苑镇), Ranzhuang (冉庄镇), Yangcheng (阳城镇), Weicun (魏村镇), Wenren (温仁镇), Zhangdeng (张登镇), Dazhuang (大庄镇), Zangcun (臧村镇), Baituan (白团镇), Shiqiao (石桥镇), Donglü (东闾镇), Heqiao (何桥镇), Wangting (望亭镇)

Townships:

- Beidian Township (北店乡), Lizhuang Township (李庄乡), Beiwangli Township (北王力乡), Suncun Township (孙村乡), Yanzhuang Township (阎庄乡)

== Notable people ==
- Joseph Wei Jingyi 魏景义 (born 1958), a Chinese Catholic priest and bishop
- Liu Huanqi 刘焕岐 (1928-2014), military officer

== See also ==
- Donglü, Donglü Town, Qingyuan
