= Apostolic Prefecture of Xinjiang-Urumqi =

Catholic missionary jurisdiction in China

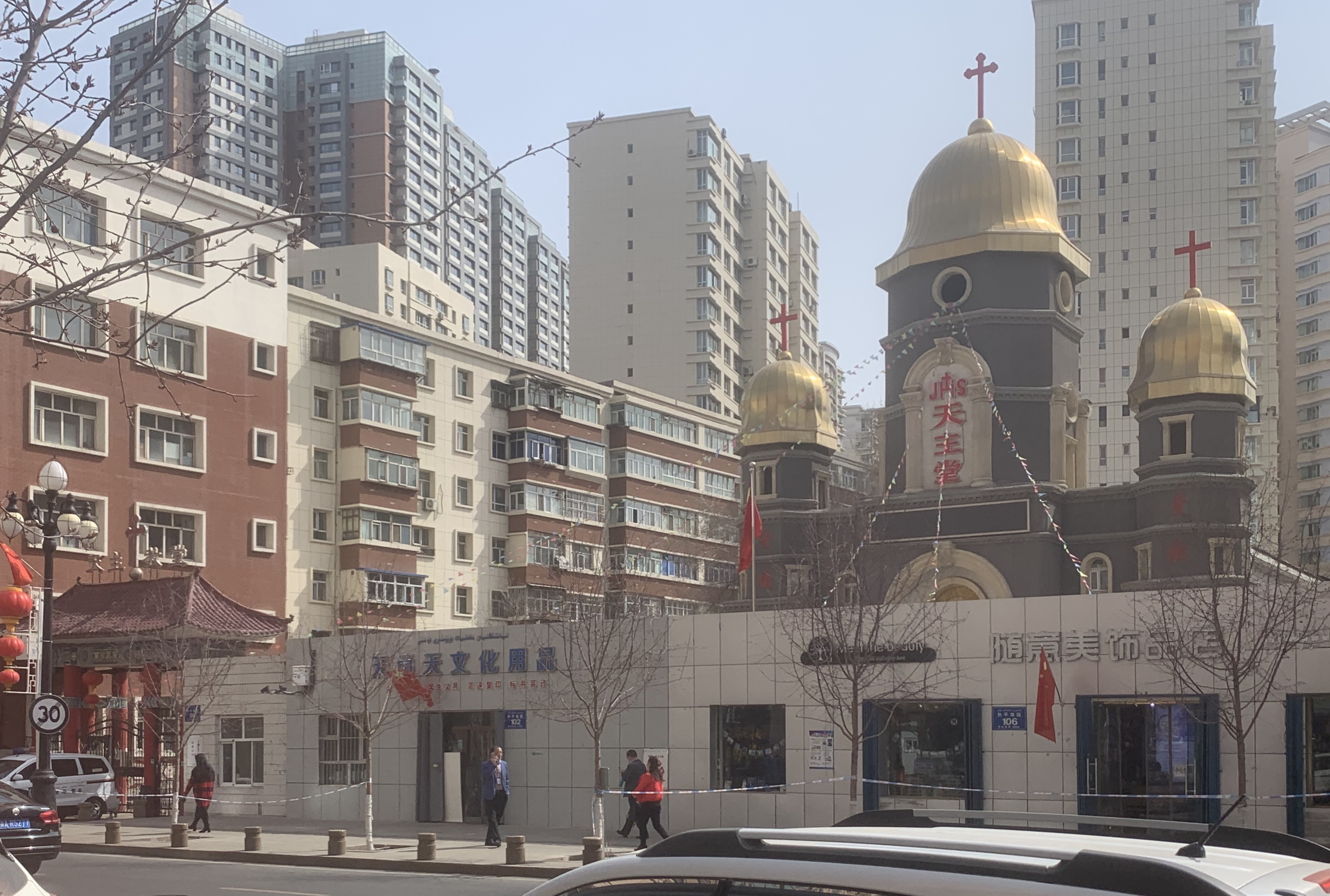
Immaculate Conception Cathedral, Ürümqi

The Apostolic Prefecture of Xinjiang-Urumqi is a pre-diocesan missionary Latin jurisdiction of the Catholic Church in northwestern China's vast region Xinjiang, which is exempt, i.e. directly dependent on the Holy See and its missionary Roman Congregation for the Evangelization of Peoples, not part of any ecclesiastical province.

It borders on Kazakhstan, Kyrgyzstan and Tajikistan (all three Ex-Soviet West Turkestan), Afghanistan, Pakistan/India-disputed Kashmir, Tibet (Diocese of Kangding), Kokonor (Apostolic Prefecture of Xining), Han-China proper (Archdiocese of Lanzhou) and (Outer) Mongolia.

Its episcopal see is the Cathedral of the Immaculate Conception, in regional capital Ürümqi. No statistics are available.

== Antecedents ==
- Modern missions in Xinjiang (from contemporaries in the West during the 1920s and 1930s known as Sinkiang) were mounted by the Scheutists from their neighboring Apostolic Vicariate of Kansu (now Archdiocese of Lanzhou), under its authority.
- On 1 October 1888 the Holy See erected and confided to them a Mission sui juris of I-li, restoring (while demoting) in the name the short-lived Diocese of Ili-baluc (1320–30), which has been a suffragan of the Archdiocese of Khanbalik, in the Great Khan's Mongol-Chinese capital.
- This Independent Mission of Ili was suppressed on 8 March 1922 by Pius XI's papal brief (breve) Apostolatus officium, incorporating its territory in the Western Kansu (the former Kansu; two year later renamed Lanchowfu).

== History ==
- Established on 14 February 1930 as Mission sui juris of Xinjiang 新疆 (中文) / Urumqi 烏魯木齊 (中文) / Sinkiang / Xinjiang-Urumqi 新疆烏魯木齊 (中文) / Sinkiangen(sis) (Latin) by Pius XI's papal brief Decet Romanum Pontificem, on Ili's former territory, split off from the then Apostolic Vicariate of Lanchowfu 蘭州府), but now confided to the Divine Word Missionaries.
- Promoted on 21 May 1938 as Apostolic Prefecture of Xinjiang 新疆 (中文) / Urumqi 烏魯木齊 (中文) / Sinkiang / Xinjiang-Urumqi 新疆烏魯木齊 (中文) / Sinkiangen(sis) (Latin)

== Ordinaries ==
(all Roman Rite)

Ecclesiastical Superior of Xinjiang 新疆

- Father Ferdinando Loy (卢裴德), Divine Word Missionaries (S.V.D.) (born Germany) (20 November 1931 – 21 May 1938)

Apostolic Prefects of Xinjiang 新疆

- Ferdinando Loy (卢裴德), S.V.D. (21 May 1938 – death 23 June 1969)
- Paul Xie Ting-zhe (謝庭哲) (born China 1931 – clandestine consecration as bishop on 25 November 1991 – death 14 August 2017)

== See also ==
- Christianity in Xinjiang
- List of Catholic dioceses in China

== Sources and external links ==
- GCathholic, with Google satellite photo - data for all sections, accessed 18 April 2017
