= Apostolic Prefecture of Guilin =

Catholic territorial jurisdiction in China

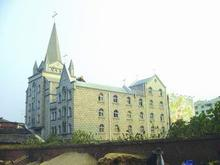

The Apostolic Prefecture of Guilin is a Roman Catholic Prefecture that has jurisdiction over Catholics within the Guilin region of Guangxi Zhuang Autonomous Region in China.

== History ==
Like other apostolic prefectures, it is immediately subject to the Holy See.

It was established on February 9, 1938, under the authority of American missionary priest John Angel Romaniello. Like other foreign missionaries, he was expelled from China at the time of the Korean war in the 1950s, however, he retained the legal office of prefect of Guilin in the church until 1983.

In 1993 a bishop was consecrated for Guilin, Bishop Benedict Cai (Chinese name: Cai Xiufeng 蔡秀峰). The consecration of Bishop Benedict was done without the expressed approval of the Holy See and would therefore be subject to a penalty of automatic excommunication unless done under a perceived threat of force or done with secret permission from the Holy See. Bishop Benedict died on August 20, 2007, at the age of 90; as of 2015 no new bishop had been consecrated yet as his replacement and the tiny Catholic community in Guilin had only one priest in one church for the entire region.

== Churches ==
Guilin only has one Catholic church. Guilin region has about 4.5 million people, but there are only about 4,000 Catholics, most of whom are migrants from other places who work in Guilin.

This church is located slightly to the east of the intersection of jiefang lu (liberation road) and zhongshan zhonglu (middle mountain centre road) in downtown Guilin. It is located on the north side of jiefang lu (address in Chinese 桂林市解放东路48号天主堂), with a small park filled with palm trees between the street and the church. It has mass in Chinese at 8:00am on Sunday, and 7:30am on weekdays (7:00 in the hot summer). The listed phone number of the church is 0773-2822107.

The church was built in the early 2000s, replacing a much older church built in the 1930s that ceased to be used. When the church was built in the 2000s, the city government of Guilin planned to place a new building in between the church and the road, thus almost completely blocking all access and view of the church, however, because of replacement in the staff of the municipal government, this plan did not come to be and the city government instead placed a park instead.

The church is dedicated to St Therese de Lisieux.
