= Apostolic Prefecture of Jian'ou =

Catholic missionary jurisdiction in China

Apostolic Vicariate of Jian'ou Apostolica Praefectura Kienovensis 天主教建瓯监牧区

Location
- Country: China
- Territory: Jian'ou, Wuyishan, Pucheng County, Songxi County, Zhenghe County, and Jianyang District of Nanping, Fujian
- Ecclesiastical province: Immediately subject to the Holy See

Information
- Rite: Latin Rite
- Cathedral: Cathedral in Jian'ou

Current leadership
- Pope: Francis
- Bishop: Peter Lin Jiashan

The Apostolic Prefecture of Jian'ou is an apostolic prefecture located in the city of Jian'ou that is immediately subject to the Holy See. On 8 January 1938, the Apostolic Vicariate of Jian'ou was established and placed under the care of the Dominican Order. In 1950, there were around 1450 faithful in the jurisdiction.

== Leadership ==
- Archbishop Peter Lin Jia-shan (2004–present) as prefect apostolic
- Paolo Adamo Curran, O.P. (1948-1953)
- Michele Agostino O’Connor, O.P. (1938-1941)
- Guglielmo Ferrer Cassidy, O.P. (1937-1938)
