= Apostolic Prefecture of Shaowu =

Catholic missionary jurisdiction in China

Apostolic Vicariate of Shaowu Apostolica Praefectura Shaovuensis 天主教邵武监牧区

Location
- Country: China
- Territory: Shaowu and Guangze County of Nanping; Taining County and Jianning County of Sanming
- Ecclesiastical province: Immediately subject to the Holy See

Information
- Denomination: Catholic Church
- Rite: Latin Rite

Current leadership
- Pope: Leo XIV
- Bishop: Peter Wu Yishun

The Apostolic Prefecture of Shaowu is an apostolic prefecture located in the city of Shaowu (Fujian) that is immediately subject to the Holy See. On May 21, 1938, the Apostolic Vicariate of Jian'ou was established and placed under the care of the Salvatorians. In 1950, there were around 5112 faithful in the jurisdiction.

== Leadership ==
(All Roman Rite)

=== Superior of the Mission "Sui Iuris" of Shaowu ===
- Heribert Aloysius Theodor Winkler, S.D.S. (9 Jan 1930 – 21 May 1938), resigned

=== Prefect of Shaowu ===
- Inigo Maximilian König, S.D.S (21 May 1938 – 13 Aug 1964)

=== Bishops of Shaowu ===
- Peter Wu Yishun (16 December 2023 – Present)
