= Apostolic Prefecture of Qiqihar =

Catholic missionary jurisdiction in China

Coordinates: 47.3333°N 123.9670°E

The Apostolic Prefecture of Qiqihar (or Tsitsikar) (simplified Chinese: 齐齐哈尔; traditional Chinese: 齊齊哈爾; pinyin: Qíqíhā'ěr) is a Latin Church missionary jurisdiction in Heilongjiang province, China. Its cathedral episcopal see is the Cathedral of St. Michael in the city of Qiqihar. It is exempt, i.e. directly subject to the Holy See, not part of any ecclesiastical province.

== History ==
- It was established on 9 July 1928 as Mission sui juris of Qiqihar (Tsitsikar), on territories split off from the Apostolic Vicariate of Jilin (吉林) and the Apostolic Vicariate of Rehe (熱河)
- On 17 August 1931, it was promoted as Apostolic Prefecture of Qiqihar / Tsitsikar.

== Ordinaries and precursor ==
(all Latin Church)

Ecclesiastical Superior of the Independent Mission of Qiqihar (Tsitsikar)

- Eugène-Jean Imhof (1929.04.28 – 1931.08.17 see below)

Apostolic Prefects of Qiqihar

- Eugène-Jean Imhof (英賀福 · 歐日諾) (see above 1931.08.17 – death 1934.01.17)
- Paul Hugentobler (胡干普), Society of Bethlehem Mission Immensee (S.M.B.) (1934.11.09 – death 1972.06.27)
- Paul Guo Wenzhi (郭文治) (1989 – 2000.08)
- Joseph Wei Jingyi (魏景義) (2000.08 – ...), succeeding as previous Coadjutor of Qiqihar (1995 – 2000.08)

== See also ==
- Roman Catholicism in China

== Source and External links ==
- GigaCatholic, with incumbent biography links
