= Apostolic Prefecture of Xing'anfu =

Catholic missionary jurisdiction in China

Apostolic Prefecture of Xing'anfu Praefectura Apostolica Hinganfuensis 興安府

Location
- Country: Hubei, China

Statistics
- Area: 25,000 km^{2} (9,700 sq mi)

Information
- Rite: Latin Rite
- Cathedral: Cathedral of the Sacred Heart of Jesus in Ankang, Shaanxi

Current leadership
- Pope: Francis
- Bishop: John Wang Xiaoxun

The Apostolic Prefecture of Xing'anfu (Latin: Hinganfuen(sis), Chinese: 興安府; pinyin: Xing'anfu) or Apostolic Prefecture of Ankang is a Latin Catholic pre-diocesan jurisdiction located in Shaanxi. It depends directly on the Holy See and its missionary Dicastery for Evangelization.

== History ==
- 28 March 1928: Established as Apostolic Prefecture of Xing’anfu from then the Apostolic Vicariate of Hanzhong and Apostolic Vicariate of Xi’anfu.

== Prelates ==
- Prefects Apostolic of Xing’anfu (Roman Rite)
  - Fr. Giovanni Soggiu, O.F.M.Conv. (1 Aug 1928 – 12 Nov 1930)
  - Fr. Berardo Barracciu, O.F.M.Conv. (26 Feb 1932 – 3 Sep 1940)
  - Fr. Emilio Favarato, O.F.M.Conv. (20 Jun 1941 – 1946)
  - Fr. Pietro Maleddu, O.F.M.Conv. (7 May 1948 – 1983)
    - Fr. John Baptist Ye Ronghua, administrator (1987 – 10 Dec 2000)
  - Bishop John Baptist Ye Ronghua (10 Dec 2000 – 28 Aug 2022)
    - Bishop John Wang Xiaoxun, coadjutor (30 Nov 2016 – 28 Aug 2022)
  - Bishop John Wang Xiaoxun (since 28 Aug 2022)

== See also ==
- Roman Catholicism in China
