= Apostolic Prefecture of Yixian =

Catholic missionary jurisdiction in China

The Apostolic Prefecture of Yixian is a Latin Catholic missionary pre-diocesan jurisdiction in the PR China, near Beijing and Baoding.

== History ==
On 1929.05.25, the jurisdiction was established as Mission sui juris of Yixian 易縣 (中文) alias Yihsien, on territories split off from the then Apostolic Vicariate of Beijing 北京 and Apostolic Vicariate of Baodingfu 保定府).

Promoted on 9 December 1935 as Apostolic Prefecture of Yixian, remaining exempt (directly subject to the Holy See, not part of any ecclesiastical province) and not entitled to a titular bishop.

== Ordinaries ==
(all Roman Rite)

Ecclesiastical superior of the Mission sui iuris of Yixian

- Father Tarcisio Martina (馬迪懦), Stigmatines (C.S.S.) (1929.10.22 – 1935.12.09 see below)

Apostolic Prefects of Yixian

- Tarcisio Martina (馬迪懦), C.S.S. (see above 1935.12.09 – death 1961.11.12)
- Francis Zhou Shan-fu (周善夫) (1981–1988)
- Paul Song Wei-li (宋維禮), Lazarists (C.M.) (1982 – 1996.07.20); previously uncanonical Auxiliary Bishop of Xianxian 獻縣 (China) (1982 – 1994.05.06); later uncanonical Bishop of the same Xianxian (1994.05.06 – 1996.07.20)
- Peter Liu Guan-dong (劉冠東) (1988–1996), succeeding as previous Coadjutor Bishop of Yixian (1982–1988)
- Cosmas Shi En-xiang (師恩祥) (1996 – 2015.01), previously Auxiliary Bishop of Yixian
- (sede vacante)

== See also ==
- Roman Catholicism in China

== Source and external links ==
- GCatholic, with incumbent biography links
