= Prefecture Apostolic of Xinjiang =

Roman Catholic missionary jurisdiction in China)

Apostolic Prefecture of Xinjiang Praefectura Apostolica Kiangchovensis

Location
- Country: China
- Ecclesiastical province: Shanxi

Information
- Rite: Latin Church
- Cathedral: Cathedral of the Immaculate Heart of Mary in Xinjiang

Current leadership
- Pope: Leo XIV
- Bishop: Vacant

The Roman Catholic Apostolic Prefecture of Xinjiang (simplified Chinese: 新绛教区; traditional Chinese: 新绛教區) is a pre-diocesan missionary jurisdiction (apostolic prefecture) located in the city of Yuncheng in Shanxi, China.

== History ==
On May 25, 1936, the Roman Catholic Diocese of Xinjiang (Jiangzhou) was established by a decree of Pope Pius XI.

== Leadership ==
- Quintinus Pessers OFM (1936-1983), expelled from the Communist China in 1954, did not have real power after that time in the diocese.
- Bishop Augustine Zheng Shouduo (1982/3-2006)
- Bishop Josaphat Li Hongguang (2006)
- Bishop Peter Wu Junwei (2009–2022)
