= Mission sui iuris =

Low-ranking subdivision of the Catholic Church

In the canon law of the Catholic Church, a mission sui iuris (Latin: missio sui iuris, pl. missiones sui iuris), also known as an independent mission, can be defined as: "an ecclesial structure erected from a previous territory, with explicit boundaries, under the care of a religious community or other diocese, responding to a missionary exigency and headed by a superior nominated by the Holy See, under the aegis of the Congregation for the Evangelization of Peoples."

It is generally applied to an area with very few Catholics, or in areas where Christianity (in particular Roman Catholicism) is either outlawed or undergoing persecution, often desolate or remote, and ranks below an apostolic prefecture and an apostolic vicariate.

The clerical head is styled ecclesiastical superior and can be a regular cleric, titular or diocesan bishop, archbishop or even a cardinal, but if of episcopal rank often resides elsewhere (notably, in another diocese or the Vatican) in chief of his primary office there.

It can either be exempt (i.e. directly subject to the Holy See, like apostolic prefectures and apostolic vicariates), or suffragan of a Metropolitan Archbishop, hence part of his ecclesiastical province.

== Current missions sui iuris ==
As of March 2017, the only remaining cases — all of the Latin Church — were:

In Asia :

- Afghanistan
- Tajikistan
- Turkmenistan

In the Atlantic Ocean :

- Saint Helena, Ascension Island and Tristan da Cunha, vested in the Apostolic Prefecture of the Falkland Islands

In the Caribbean :

- Cayman Islands, in the ecclesiastical province of the Archbishop of Kingston in Jamaica (pastoral responsibility of the Archdiocese of Detroit)
- Turks and Caicos, in the ecclesiastical province of the Archbishop of Nassau (pastoral responsibility of the Archdiocese of Newark)

In Oceania :

- Funafuti, in Tuvalu, in the ecclesiastical province of the Archbishop of Suva
- Tokelau, in the ecclesiastical province of the Archbishop of Samoa-Apia

Those for which no province is named are exempt, i.e. directly under the Holy See.

== Former missions sui iuris ==
by continent and (present/colonial) country

In Europe

- Mission sui iuris of Batavia alias Holland - or Dutch mission (Netherlands)
- Mission sui iuris of Central Norway (now Territorial Prelature of Trondheim)
- Mission sui iuris of Northern Norway (now Territorial Prelature of Tromsø)
- Mission sui iuris of Norway (now diocese of Oslo)

In Asia

- Mission sui iuris of Baku (Azerbaijan; promoted Apostolic Prefecture)
- Mission sui iuris of Coromandel Coast (India; now Metropolitan Archdiocese of Pondicherry and Cuddalore)
- Mission sui iuris of Gazireh (Turkey; suppressed)
- Mission sui iuris of Hindustan (India; repeated promotions; now Metropolitan Archdiocese of Agra)
- Mission sui iuris of I-li (imperial China; suppressed)
- Mission sui iuris of Karafuto (Japan; promoted Apostolic Prefecture, became Soviet/Russian, renamed Yuzhno Sakhalinsk)
- Mission sui iuris of Kyrgyzstan (nation; promoted Apostolic Administration)
- Mission sui iuris of Miyazaki (Japan; promoted Apostolic Prefecture, now diocese of Oita)
- Mission sui iuris of Mossul (Kurdistan, notably northern present Iraq; suppressed)
- Mission sui iuris of Nepal (nation; promoted Apostolic Vicariate)
- Mission sui iuris of Outer Mongolia (Mongolia; renamed Mission sui juris of Urga)
- Mission sui iuris of Qiqihar, alias Tsitiskar (China; promoted Apostolic Prefecture)
- Mission sui iuris of Rajaburi (Thailand; now diocese Ratchaburi)
- Mission sui iuris of Rajputana (India; promoted Apostolic Vicariate, now Diocese of Ajmer)
- Mission sui iuris of Shiqian = Shihtsien (China; promoted Apostolic Prefecture)
- Mission sui iuris of Sikkim (Indian state and Bhutan; promoted twice, now Diocese of Darjeeling)
- Mission sui iuris of Syria and Cilicia? (partially in present Iraq; temporarily promoted Apostolic Prefecture, demoted back, suppressed)
- Mission sui iuris of Trabzon (Asian Turkey; promoted Apostolic Vicariate of Anatolia)
- Mission sui iuris of Uzbekistan (nation; promoted Apostolic Administration)
- Mission sui iuris of Urga = Ulanbator (imperial China China; promoted Apostolic Prefecture of Ulaanbaatar, for (Outer) Mongolia)
- Mission sui iuris of Xinjiang-Urumqi (China; promoted Apostolic Prefecture)
- Mission sui iuris of Yixian (China; promoted Apostolic Prefecture)

In America

- Mission sui iuris of San Andrés y Providencia (Colombia; promoted Apostolic Vicariate)
- Mission sui iuris of Valparaíso (Chile; promoted Diocese)
- Mission sui iuris of Valdivia (Chile; promoted Diocese)

In Oceania

- Mission sui iuris of Drisdale River (Australia, renamed Kalumburu; suppressed)
- Mission sui iuris of Eastern Carolines (Federated States of Micronesia)
- Mission sui iuris of Kalumburu (Australia; suppressed)
- Mission sui iuris of the Marshall Islands (suppressed; later revived as Apostolic Prefecture)
- Mission sui iuris of Western Carolines (idem & Palau)

In Africa

- Mission sui iuris of Belgian Congo (or Congo Belge; (then Belgian) Congo)
- Mission sui iuris of Bikoro ((then Belgian) Congo)
- Mission sui iuris of Cunene (Angola)
- Mission sui iuris of Kenya (Kenya; various promotions, now Archdiocese of Nyeri)
- Mission sui iuris of Kwango ((then Belgian) Congo)
- Mission sui iuris of Lunda (Angola)
- Mission sui iuris of Lwangwa (Zambia)
- Mission sui iuris of Miarinarivo (Madagascar, now a diocese)
- Mission sui iuris of Tukuyu (Tanzania, now Diocese of Mbeya)
- Mission sui iuris of Upper Kassai ((then Belgian) Congo)
- Mission sui iuris of Zambesia (Zimbabwe, then Southern Rhodesia)

== See also ==
- List of Catholic dioceses (structured view)
- List of Catholic dioceses (alphabetical)
- List of Catholic archdioceses
- List of Catholic Military Ordinariates
- List of Catholic Apostolic Administrations
- List of Catholic Apostolic Vicariates
- List of Catholic Apostolic Prefectures
- Lists of Eastern Catholic exarchate types
- List of Roman Catholic Territorial Prelatures

== Sources and external links ==
- GCatholic.org - List of current Missions sui iuris (consulted September 2015)
