= Diocese of Yongjia =

Roman Catholic diocese in China

Diocese of Yongjia Dioecesis Iomchiavensis 天主教永嘉教区

Location
- Country: China
- Ecclesiastical province: Hangzhou
- Metropolitan: Hangzhou

Information
- Rite: Latin Rite
- Cathedral: St. Paul's Cathedral, Wenzhou, Zhejiang

Current leadership
- Pope: Leo XIV
- Bishop: Peter Shao Zhumin (邵祝敏)
- Metropolitan Archbishop: Joseph Yang Yongqiang

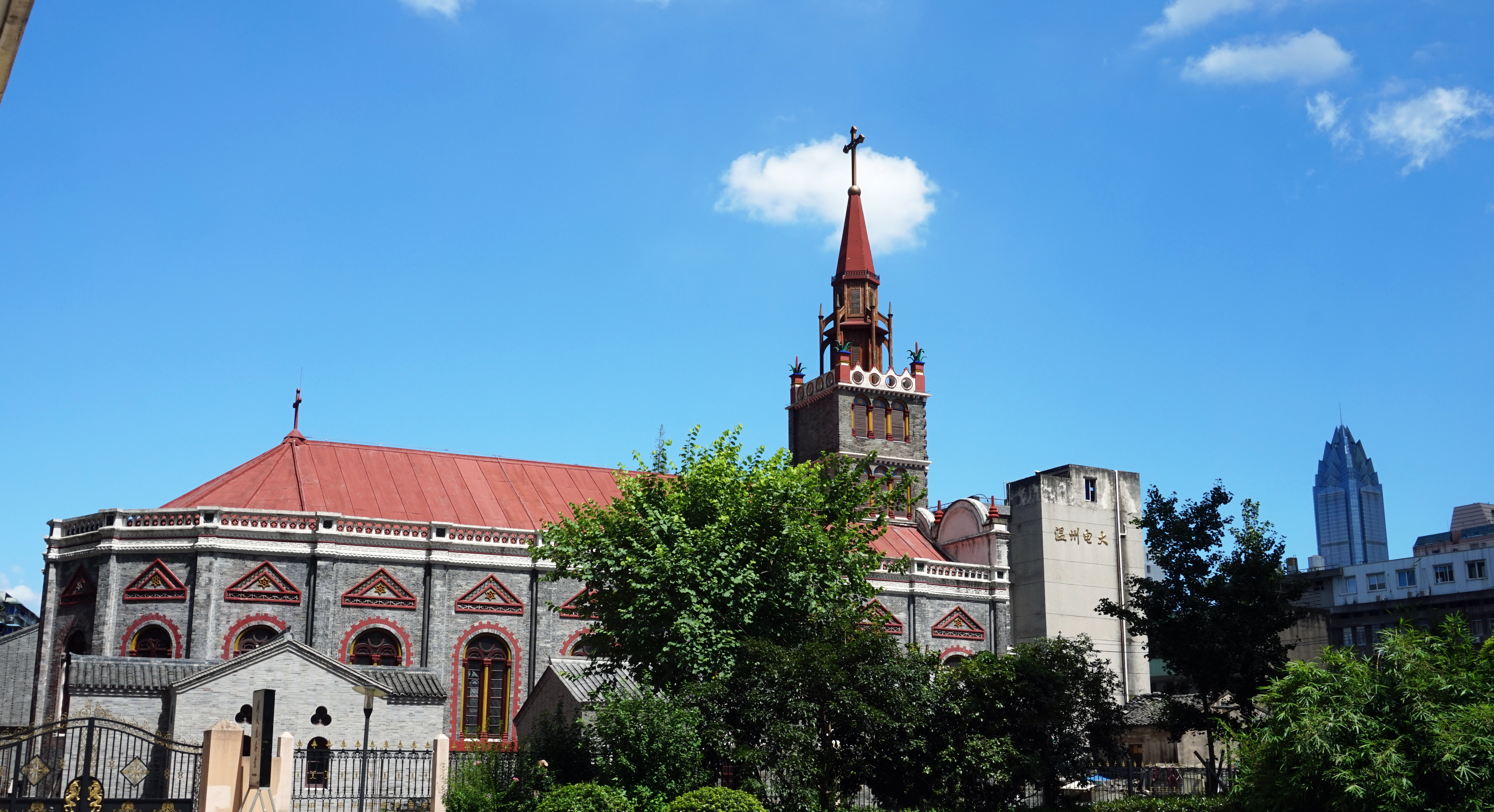
Saint Paul's Cathedral.

The Roman Catholic Diocese of Yongjia/Yungkia/Wenzhou (Latin: Iomchiaven(sis), Chinese: 永嘉, 温州) is a diocese located in the city of Yongjia in the ecclesiastical province of Hangzhou in China.

== History ==
- March 3, 1949: Established as Diocese of Yongjia from Diocese of Ningbo (天主教宁波教区)

== Leadership ==
- Bishops of Yongjia 永嘉 (Roman Rite)
  - Bishop Peter Shao Zhumin (邵祝敏) (2016–)
  - Bishop Vincent Zhu Wei-Fang (朱维芳) (2010–2016)
  - Bishop James Lin Xili (林锡黎) (1992–2007)
  - Fr. Paul Su Bo-lu (Su Pai-lu) (稣伯露) (Apostolic Administrator June 15, 1951 – 1980)
  - Bishop André-Jean-François Defebvre, C.M. (戴安德) (Apostolic Administrator 1950–1951)
