= St. Paul's Cathedral, Wenzhou =

- 温州圣保禄堂
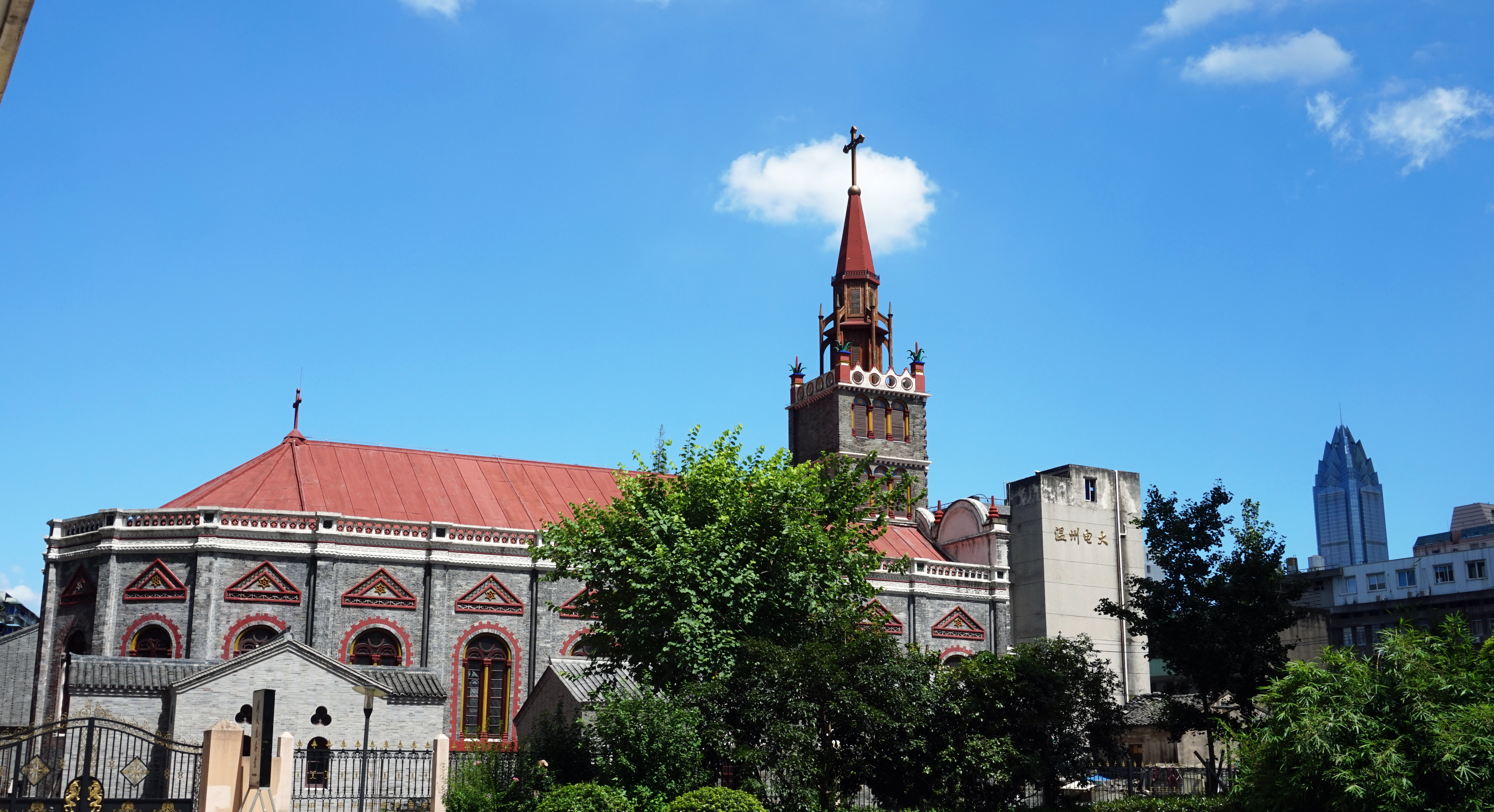
- St. Paul's Cathedral, Wenzhou in 2016

- Location in Zhejiang
- 28°00′44″N 120°39′13″E
- Location: Lucheng District, Wenzhou, Zhejiang, China
- Denomination: Roman Catholic

History
- Status: Cathedral
- Founded: 1876

Architecture
- Functional status: Active
- Architectural type: Church building
- Style: Basilica/ Romanesque architecture
- Groundbreaking: 1886
- Completed: 1891 (reconstruction)

Specifications
- Materials: Granite, bricks

Administration
- Diocese: Roman Catholic Diocese of Yongjia

Chinese name
- Simplified Chinese: 温州圣保禄堂
- Traditional Chinese: 溫州聖保祿堂
Transcriptions
Standard Mandarin
- Hanyu Pinyin: Wēnzhōu Shèngbǎolù Táng

St. Paul's Cathedral, Zhouzhai Lane
- Simplified Chinese: 周宅巷圣保禄堂
- Traditional Chinese: 周宅巷聖保祿堂
Transcriptions
Standard Mandarin
- Hanyu Pinyin: Zhōuzháixiàng Shèngbǎolù Táng

St. Paul's Cathedral, Wenzhou (Chinese: 温州圣保禄堂), locally known as St. Paul's Cathedral, Zhouzhai Lane (周宅巷圣保禄堂), is the seat of the Catholic bishopric of the city of Wenzhou in Zhejiang, China, as well as a historic building of the country.

== History ==
In September 1876, the Qing Empire and the Great Britain signed the Chefoo Convention, which stipulated the opening of additional treaty ports in Wenzhou. In December 1876, Roman Catholic Diocese of Ningbo Bishop Edmond-François Guierry came to Wenzhou to preach and bought a house in Zhouzhai Lane (周宅巷) as a church under the approval of local magistrate. In 1884, when the Sino-French War broke out, the church and other five churches were demolished in a fire.

Reconstruction of the church, designed by Paul-Marie Reynaud, commenced in 1886 and was completed in 1891. In 1904, Bishop Cyprien Aroud refurbished and redecorated the church, making it the tallest building in Wenzhou. In 1935, Bishop Paweł Kurtyka added a priest dormitory to the church, which known as "Polish Priest's Building" (波兰神父楼).

During the Second Sino-Japanese War, the surrounding residents often took refuge in the church during the Japanese air raid. The church was severely damaged by Imperial Japanese Army during the Pacific War.

After the establishment of the Communist state in 1949, the Catholic activities were suppressed by the Communist government. During the ten-year Cultural Revolution, all volumes of scriptures, historical documents, and other works of art were either removed, damaged or destroyed in the massive socialist movement, and the Red Guards forced priests to return to secular life. The church building was closed and used as a factory. The church was returned to the Wenzhou Catholic Patriotic Association in 1982 and was officially reopened to the public on the Christmas in 1983. The church became dilapidated for neglect. Since December 2001, the lobby has been out of use. In 2011, it was declared a provincial cultural relic preservation organ by the Zhejiang government. Renovations to the church began in 2011.

== Architecture ==
The church is 17.5 metres (57 ft) wide, 36.5 metres (120 ft) deep and 35.5 metres (116 ft) high and preserves the largest, grandest church in Wenzhou.

It is located in the north and faces the south with a Romanesque architecture style.

== Gallery ==
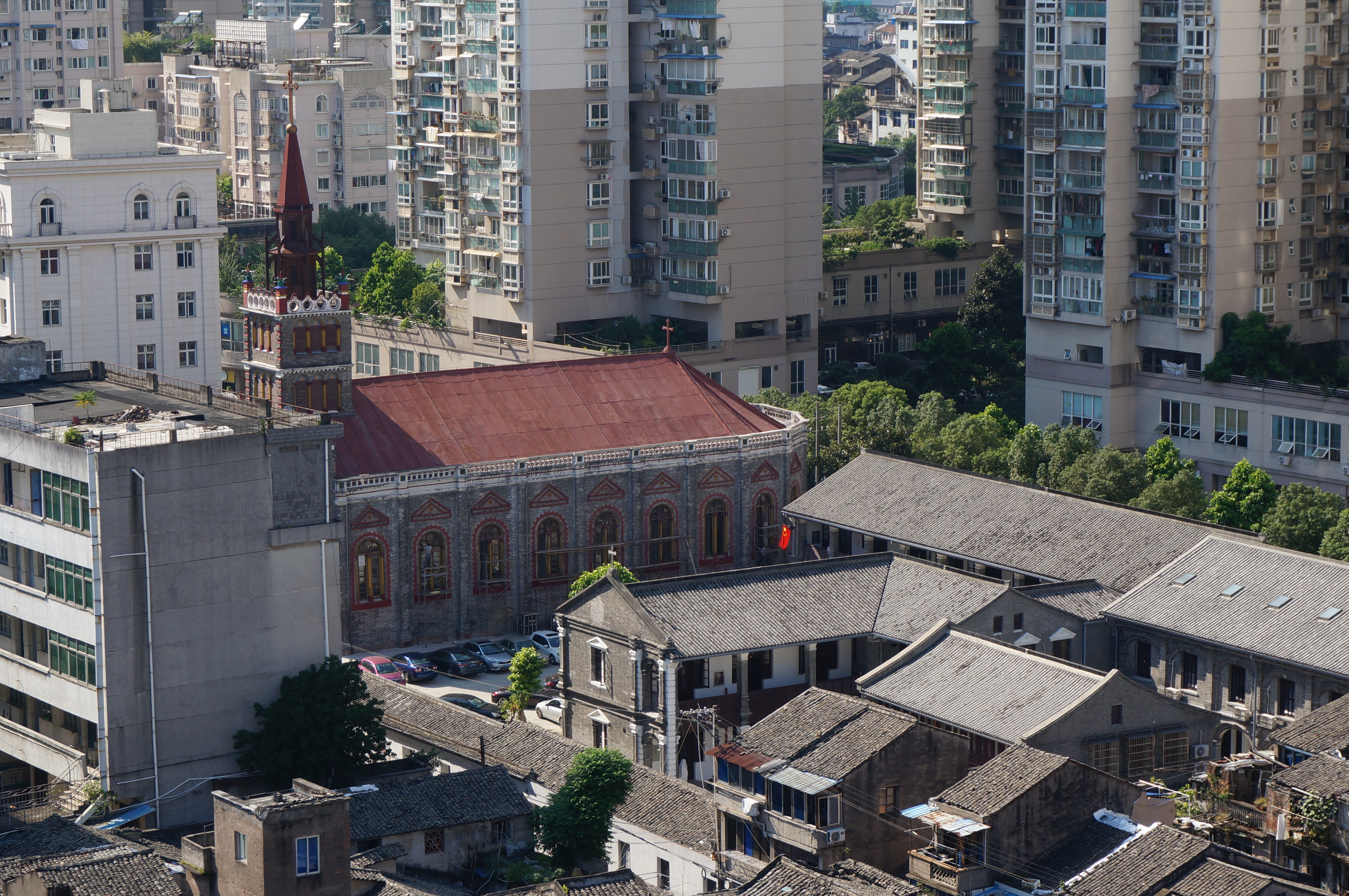
Bird's-eye view of the church

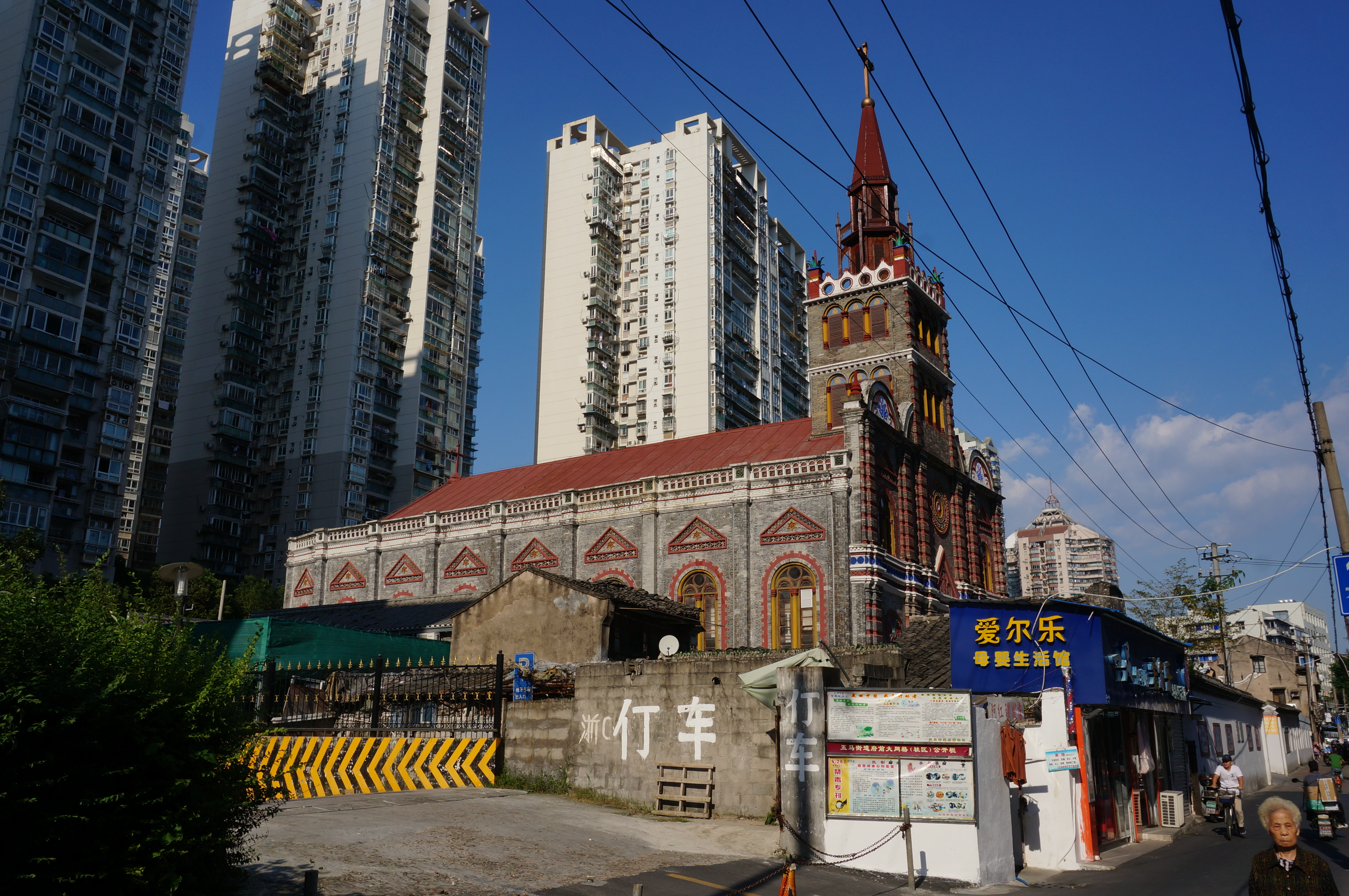
Side of the church

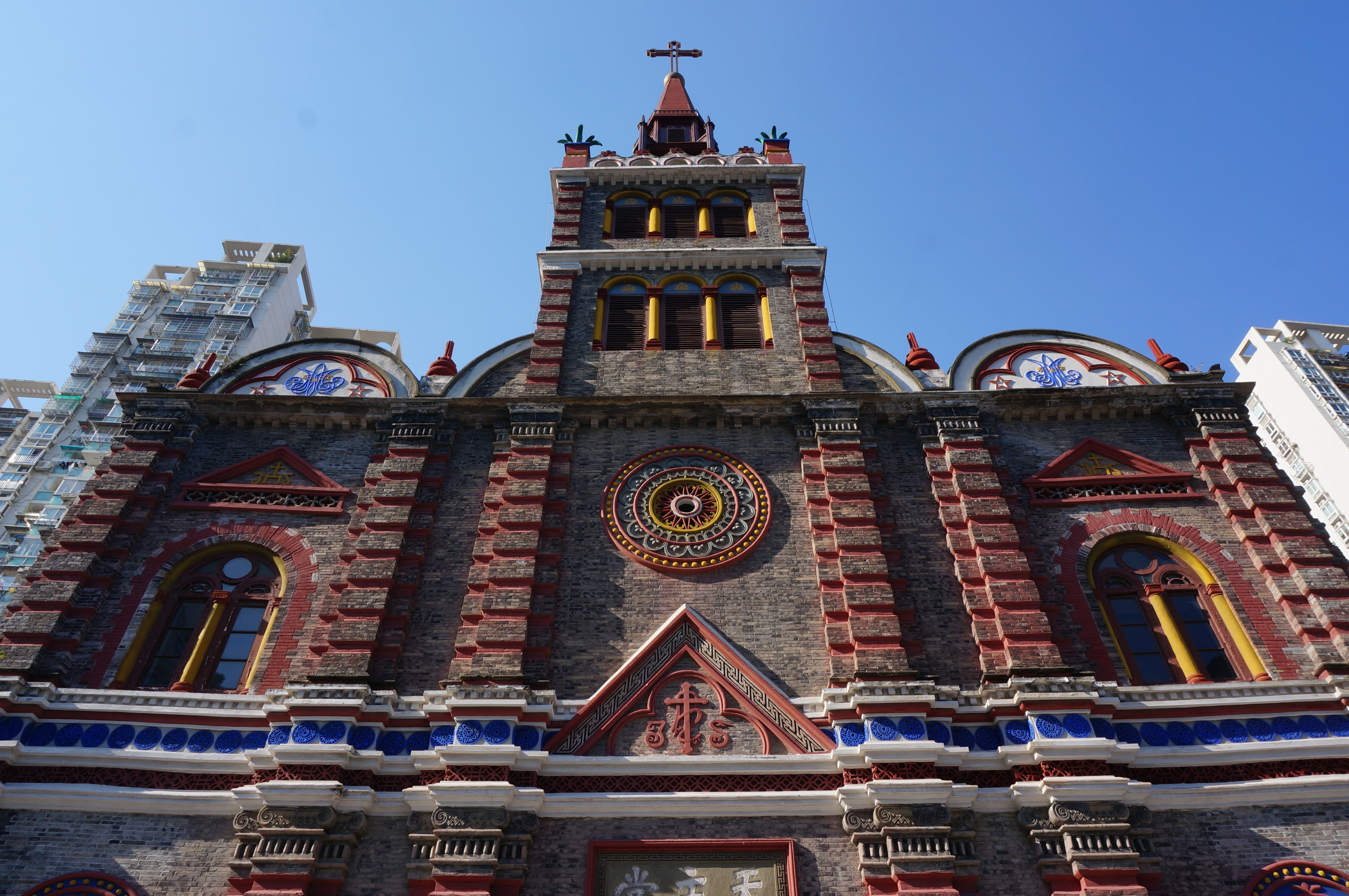
Frontal view of the church

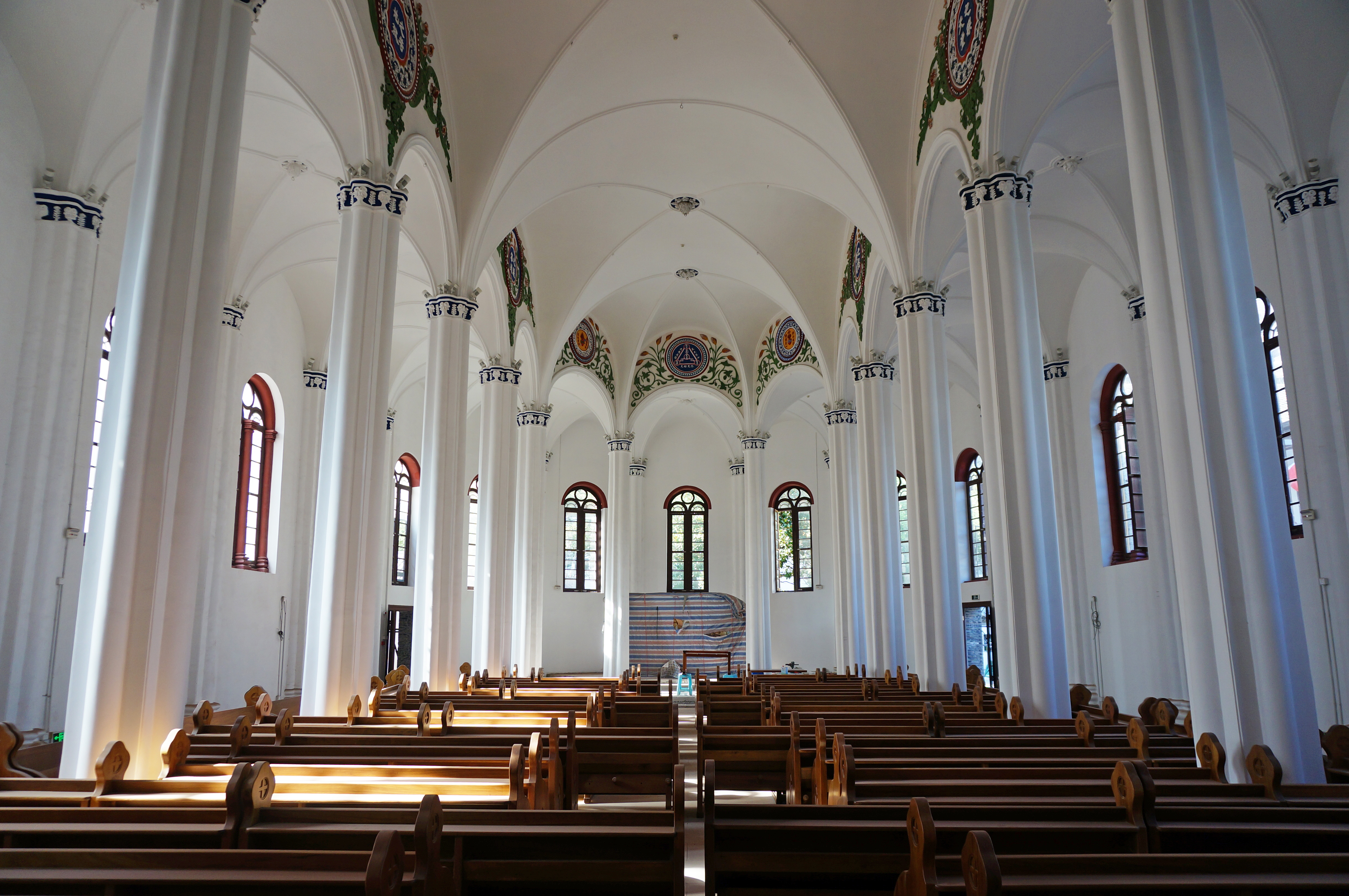
Interior

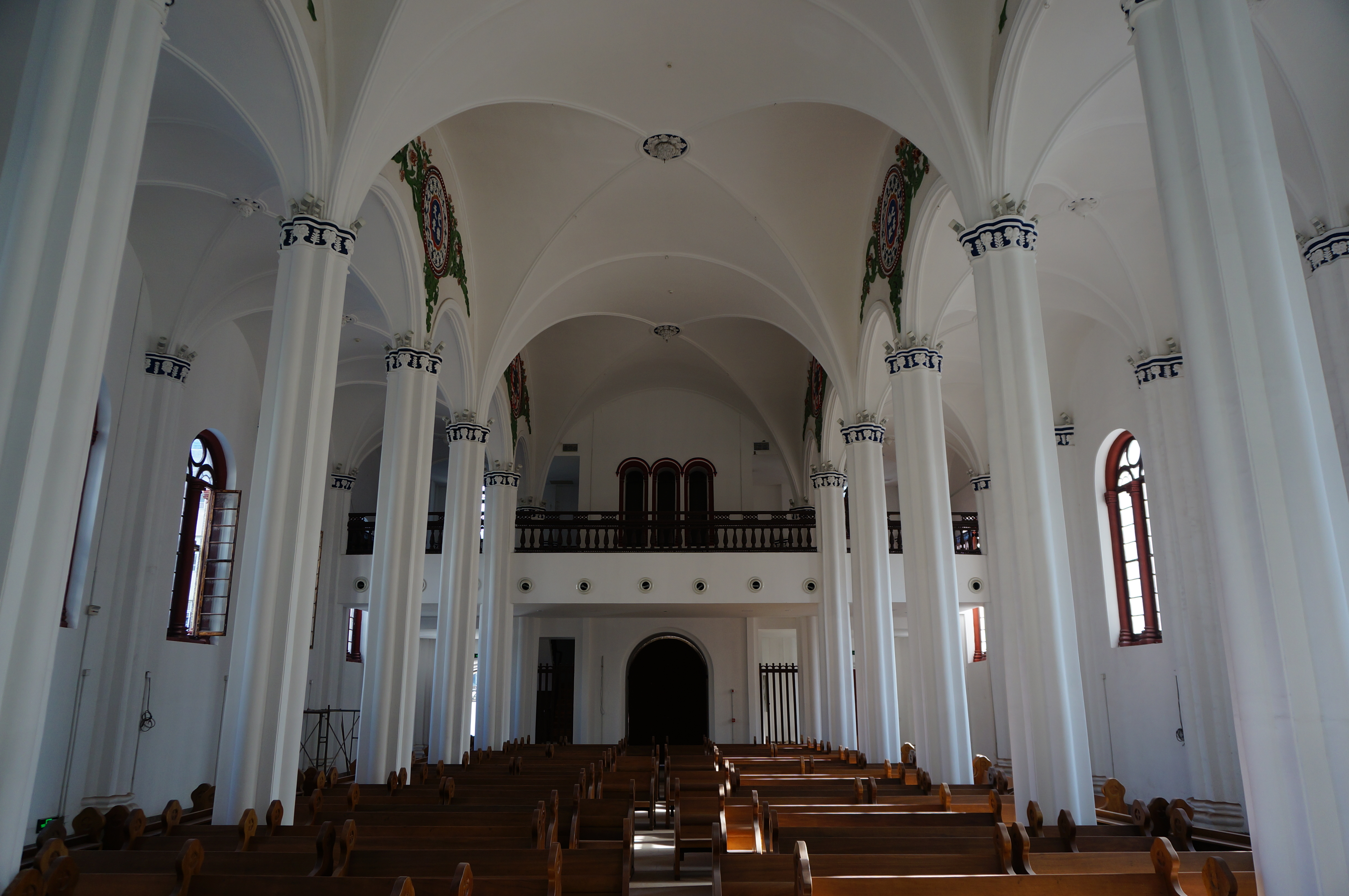
Interior

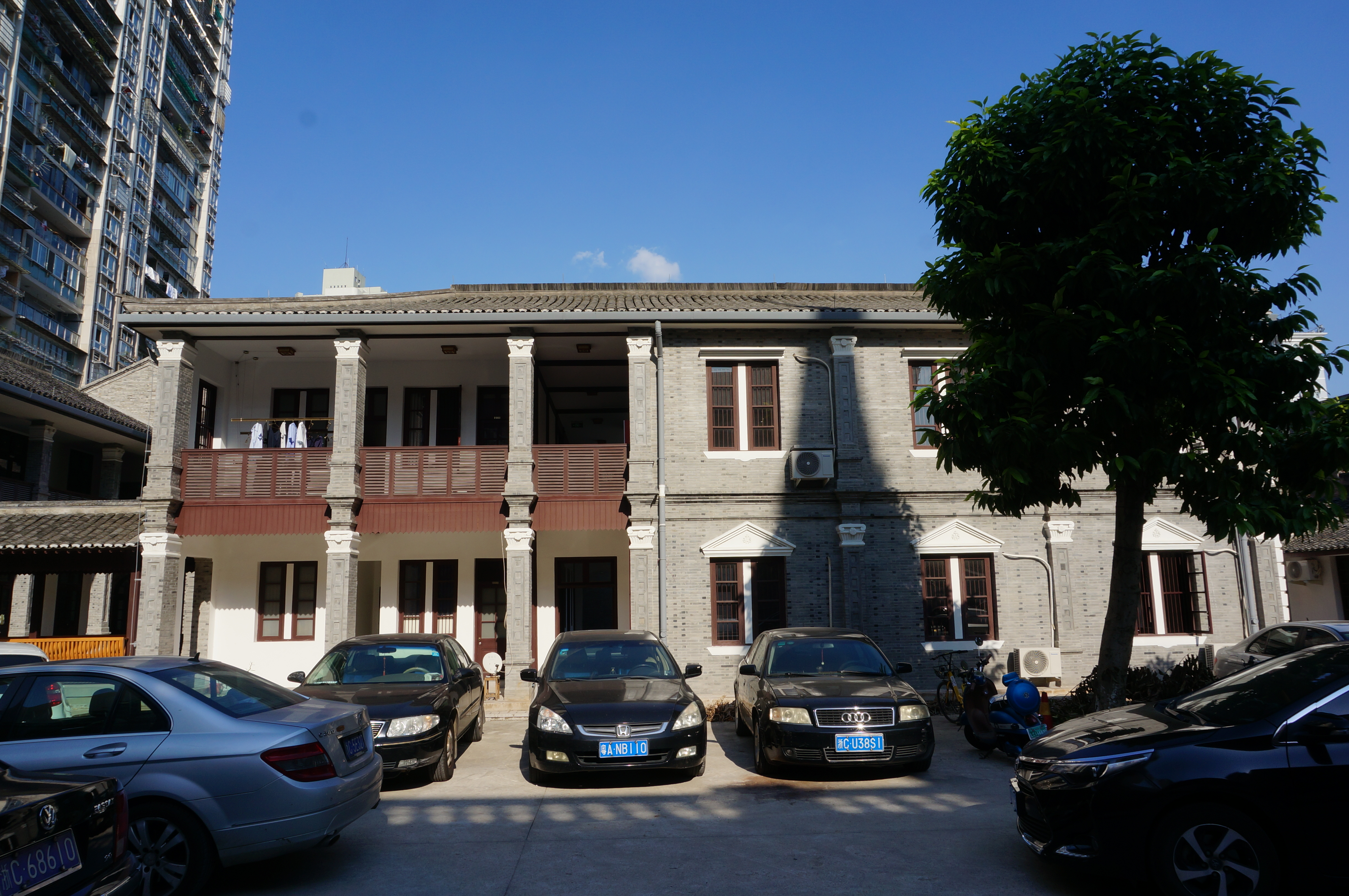
Polish Priest's Building
