= Francis Xavier Jin Yang-ke =

Roman Catholic bishop

Most Reverend Francis Xavier Jin Yang-ke
- Bishop of Ningbo
- Archdiocese: Hangzhou
- Diocese: Ningbo
- Appointed: 25 September 2017
- Installed: 18 August 2020
- Predecessor: Mathew Hu Xiande
- Successor: Incumbent

Orders
- Ordination: 11 November 1990
- Consecration: 28 November 2012 by Mathew Hu Xiande

Personal details
- Born: 1 January 1958 (age 68) Cixi, Zhejiang, China
- Denomination: Roman Catholic
- Coat of arms

Francis Xavier Jin Yang-ke is the current serving bishop of the Roman Catholic Diocese of Ningbo Hangzhou in China.

== Early life ==
Francis was born in Cixi, Zhejiang, China, in January 1958.

== Priesthood ==
On 11 November 1990, Francis was ordained a priest and selected as the Coadjutor Bishop of Ningbo, China, in year 2012.

== Episcopate ==
Francis was consecrated as a bishop on 28 November 2012 and succeeded as a bishop on 25 September 2017. He was installed on 18 August 2020.
