= Próspero París =

French prelate (1846-1931)

Jules Prosper París SJ
- Vicar Apostolic of Nanjing
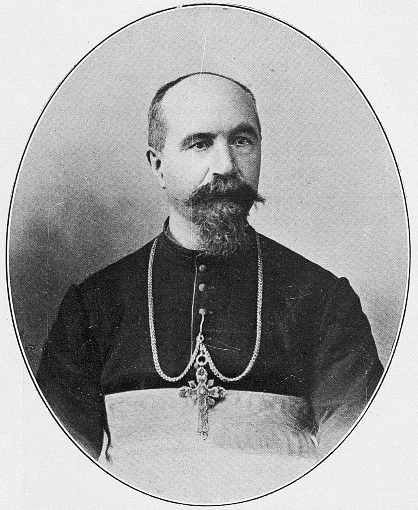
- Church: Catholic Church
- See: Vicariate Apostolic of Nanjing
- In office: 27 April 1900 – 13 May 1931
- Predecessor: Jean-Baptiste Simon
- Successor: Auguste Haouissée
- Other post: Titular Bishop of Silandus (1900-1931)

Orders
- Ordination: 18 September 1880
- Consecration: 11 November 1900 by Paul-Marie Reynaud

Personal details
- Born: 1 September 1846 Chantenay, Loire-Inférieure, Kingdom of France
- Died: 13 May 1931 (aged 84) Shanghai, Republic of China

Styles of Próspero París
- Reference style: The Most Reverend
- Spoken style: Your Excellency
- Religious style: Monsignor
- Posthumous style: none

Jules Prosper París, SJ (Chinese: 姚宗李; pinyin: Yáo Zōnglǐ; 1 September 1846 – 13 May 1931) was a French prelate of the Roman Catholic Church, who served as Apostolic Vicar of Nanking from 1900 until his death.

Born in Nantes, he was ordained as a Jesuit priest on 18 September 1880, at age 34.

On 6 April 1900 París was appointed Apostolic Vicar of Kiangnan and Titular bishop of Silandus by Pope Leo XIII. He received his episcopal consecration on the following 11 November from Bishop Paul-Marie Reynaud, CM, with Bishops Jules-Auguste Coqset, CM, and Joseph-Claude Excoffier, MEP, serving as co-consecrators.

The vicarate was renamed twice during París's tenure, from the Apostolic Vicariate of Kiang-nan to Kiangsu (8 August 1921) and later Nanking (1 May 1922).

París died at age 84.

== Notes ==
Preceded by Jean-Baptiste Simon, SJ	Apostolic Vicar of Nanking; 1900–1931	Succeeded by Auguste Haouissée, SJ
