= James Lin =

James Lin is the name of:

- James Lin Xili (林錫黎; 1918–2009), underground Roman Catholic bishop of Wenzhou, China
- Yoga Lin (林宥嘉; born 1987), Taiwanese singer
- James Lin Bingliang (林秉良), Roman Catholic archbishop of the Roman Catholic Archdiocese of Guangzhou
- James Lin, an unsuccessful candidate in the 2018 Vancouver municipal election

== See also ==
- James Linn (1749–1821), American politician
- James Ling (1922–2004), American businessman
- Jimmy Lin (born 1974), Taiwanese actor
