= Sacred Heart Cathedral, Jiaojiang =

Sacred Heart, Jiaojiang District
- 椒江耶稣圣心堂
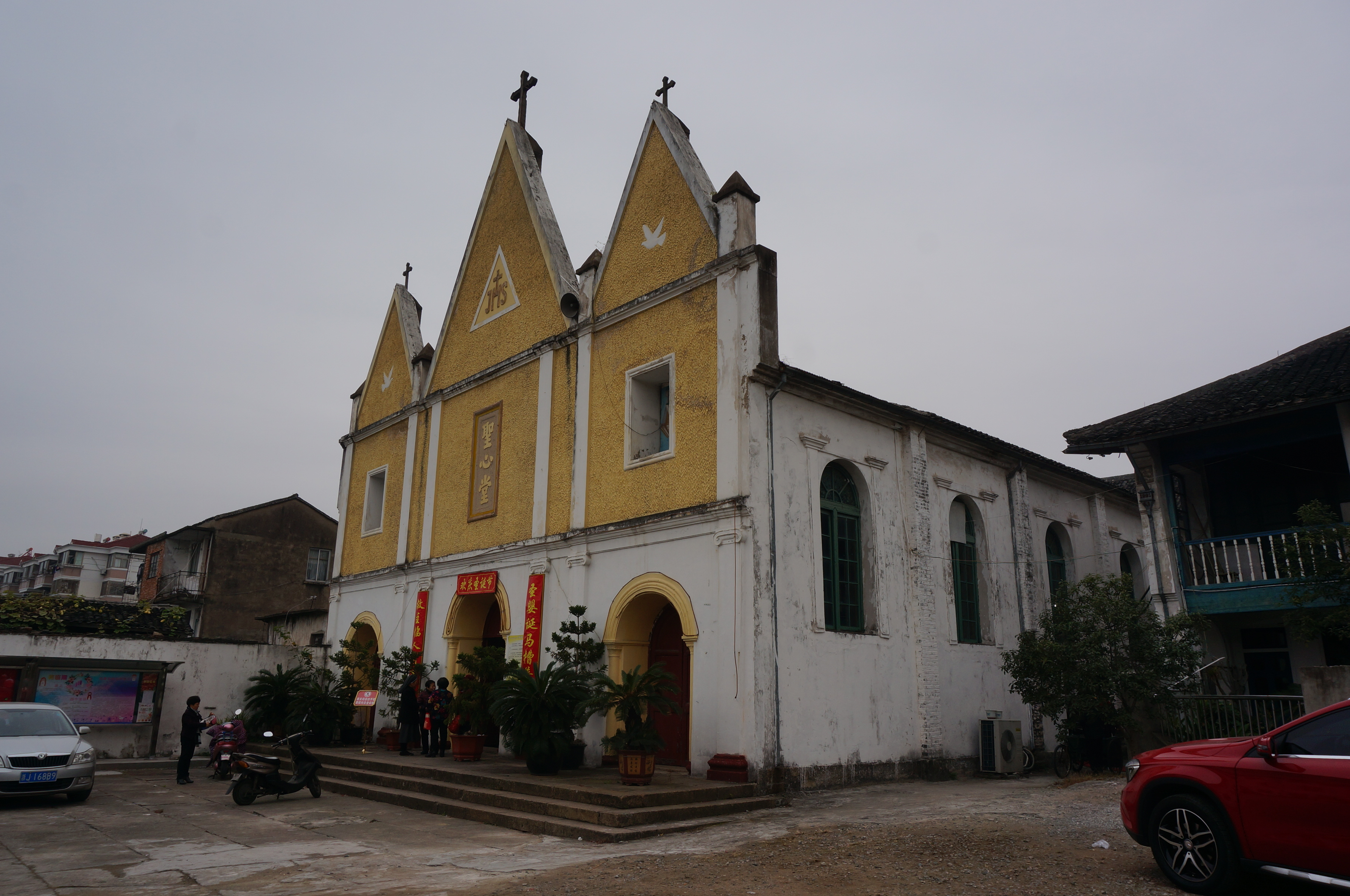
- Sacred Heart, Jiaojiang District

- Location in Zhejiang. Sacred Heart, Jiaojiang District (China)
- 28°47′02″N 121°25′01″E
- Location: Haimen Subdistrict of Jiaojiang District, Taizhou, Zhejiang
- Country: China
- Denomination: Roman Catholic

History
- Status: Parish church
- Founded: 1894

Architecture
- Functional status: Active
- Architect: Li Sicong
- Architectural type: Church building
- Years built: 1894

Specifications
- Materials: bricks and cement

Administration
- Diocese: Roman Catholic Diocese of Linhai

Sacred Heart, Jiaojiang District (Chinese: 椒江耶稣圣心堂) is a Catholic cathedral in Haimen Subdistrict, Jiaojiang District, Taizhou, Zhejiang, China.

== History ==
The church was originally built by French missionary Li Sicong (李思聪; 1864–1930) in 1894, during the reign of Guangxu Emperor (1875–1908) of the Qing dynasty (1644–1911).

In 1926, it became the cathedral of the Roman Catholic Diocese of Linhai.

After the founding of the Communist State in 1949, it was taken as property of the People's Liberation Army and then as class rooms of Yucai School (育才小学). During the Cultural Revolution, the church was slightly damaged by the Red Guards. After the 3rd Plenary Session of the 11th Central Committee of the Chinese Communist Party, according to the national policy of free religious belief, the church was officially reopened to the public in 1987.

In 2010, Anthony Xu Jiwei was ordained at the cathedral as Bishop of the Roman Catholic Diocese of Linhai, with the approval of the Holy See.

== Architecture ==
The church was built of bricks and cement.

== Gallery ==
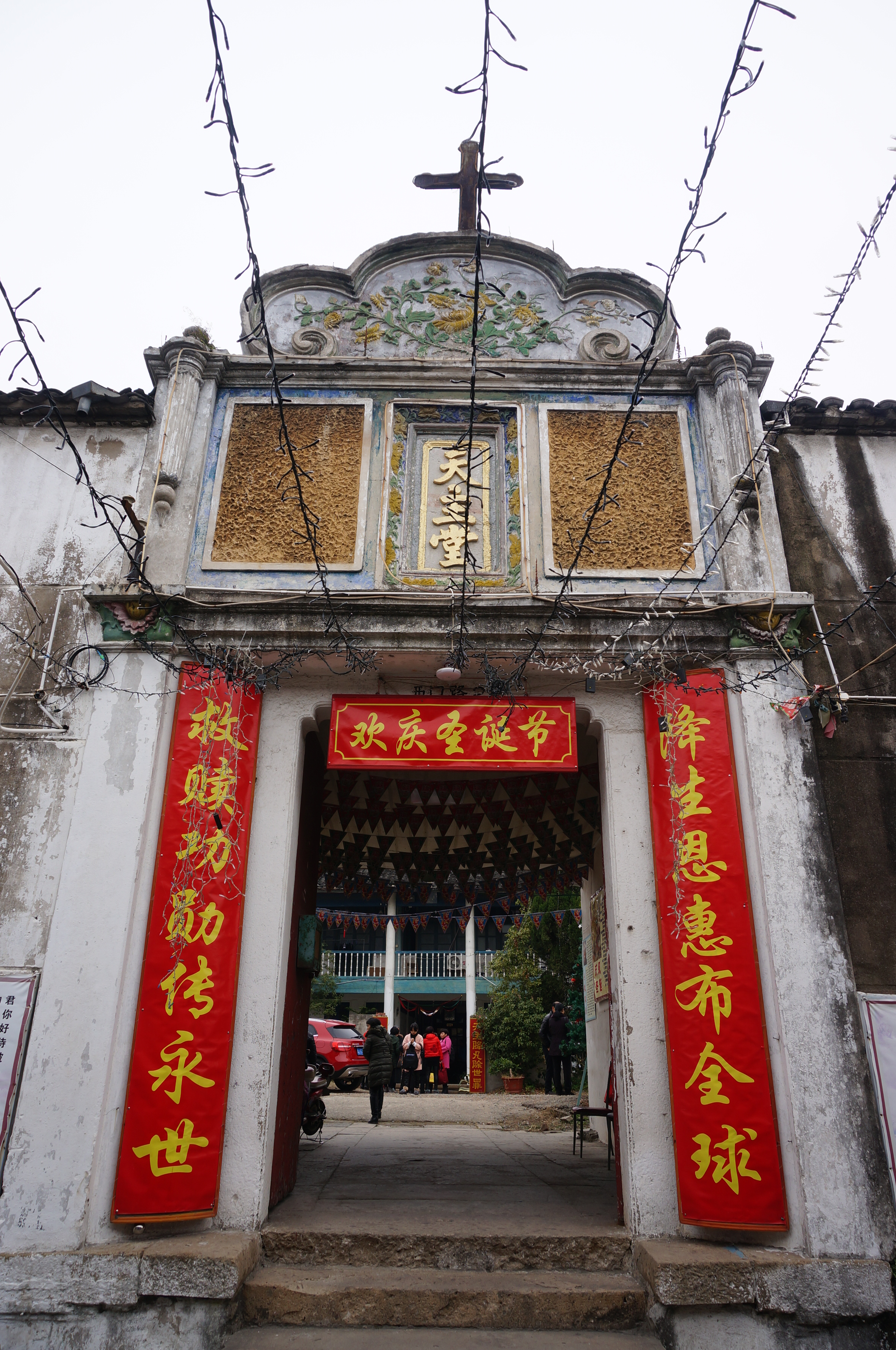
The gate for men.

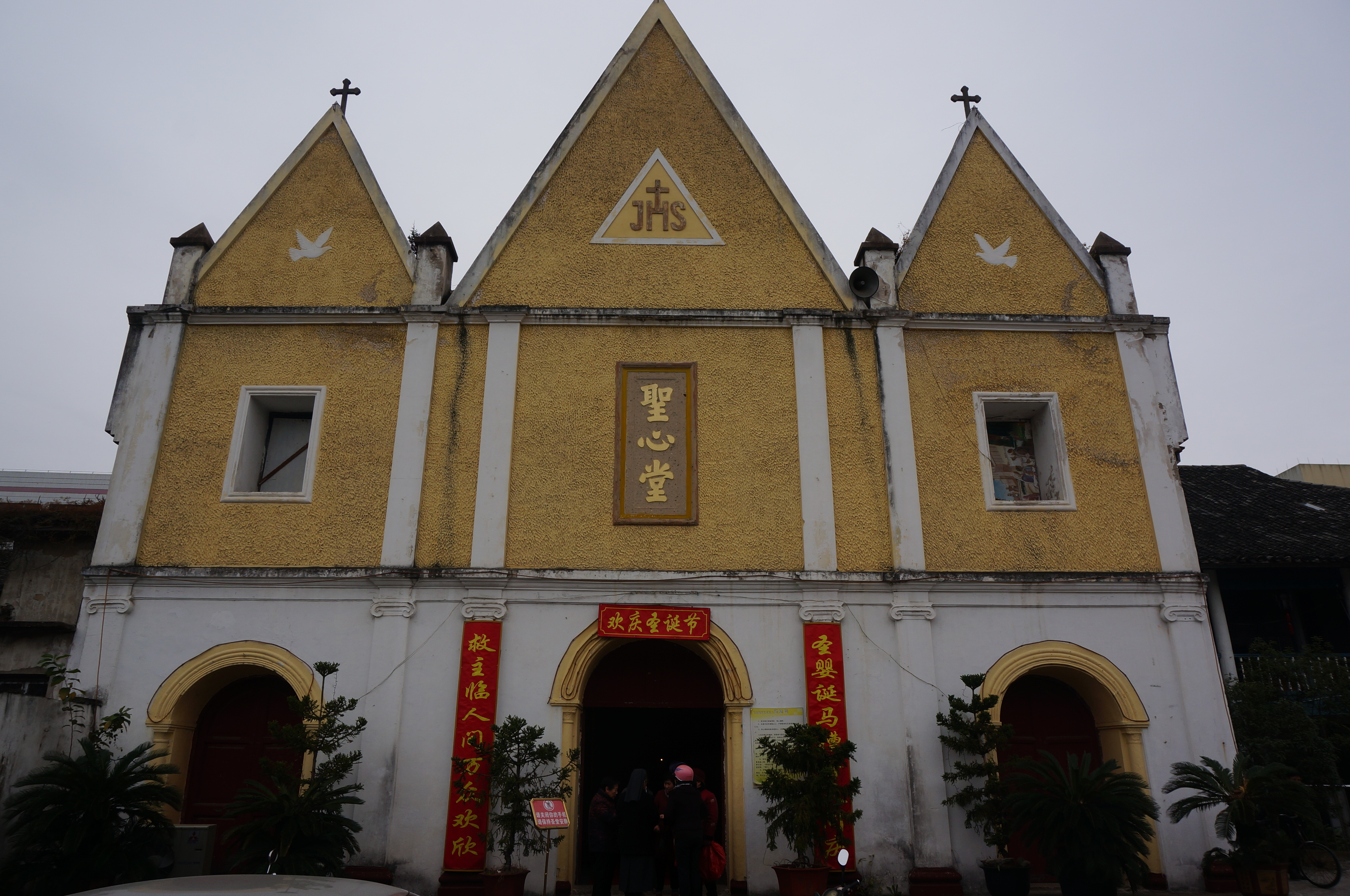
The main hall.

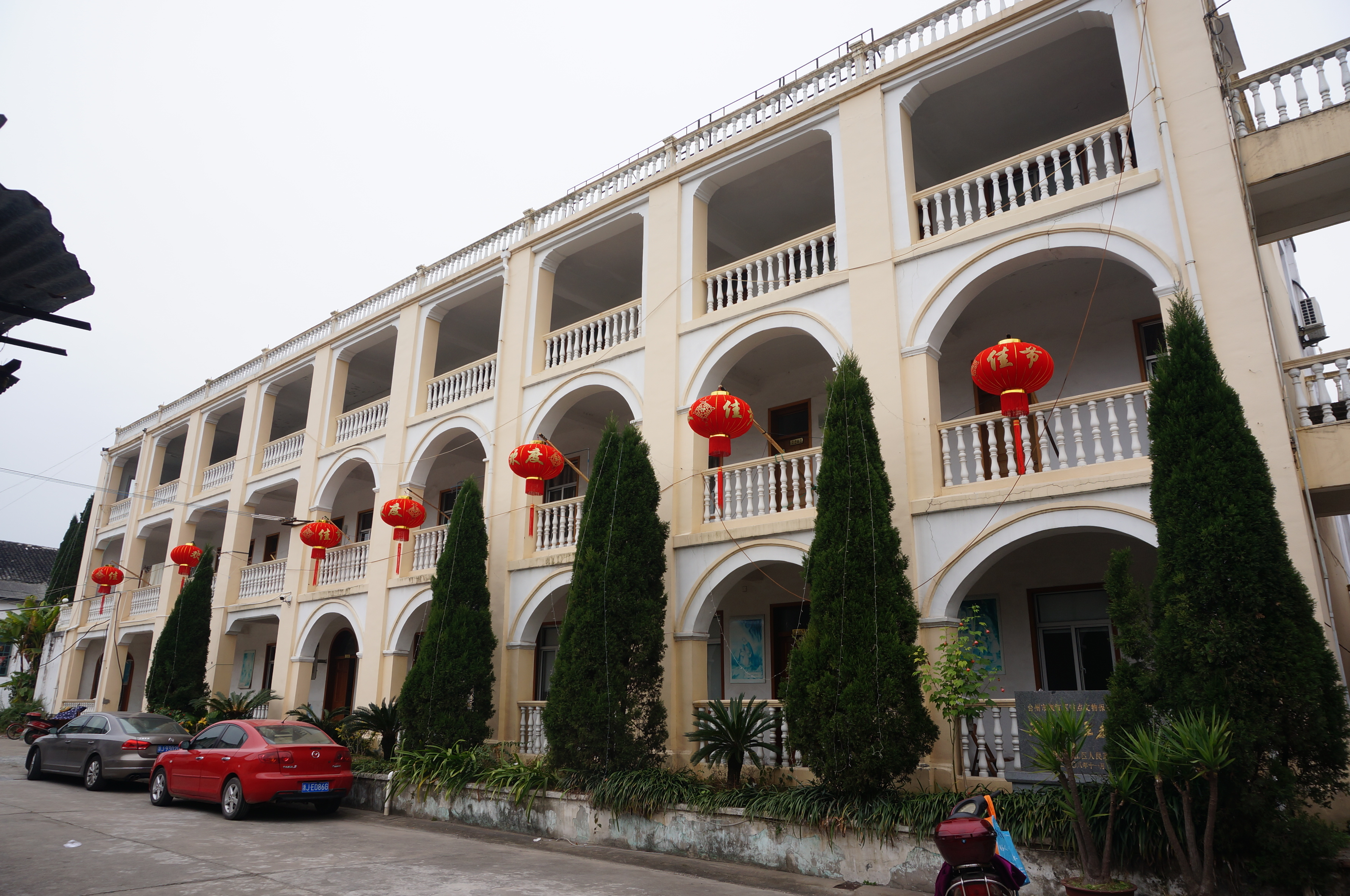
The Bishop's Office.

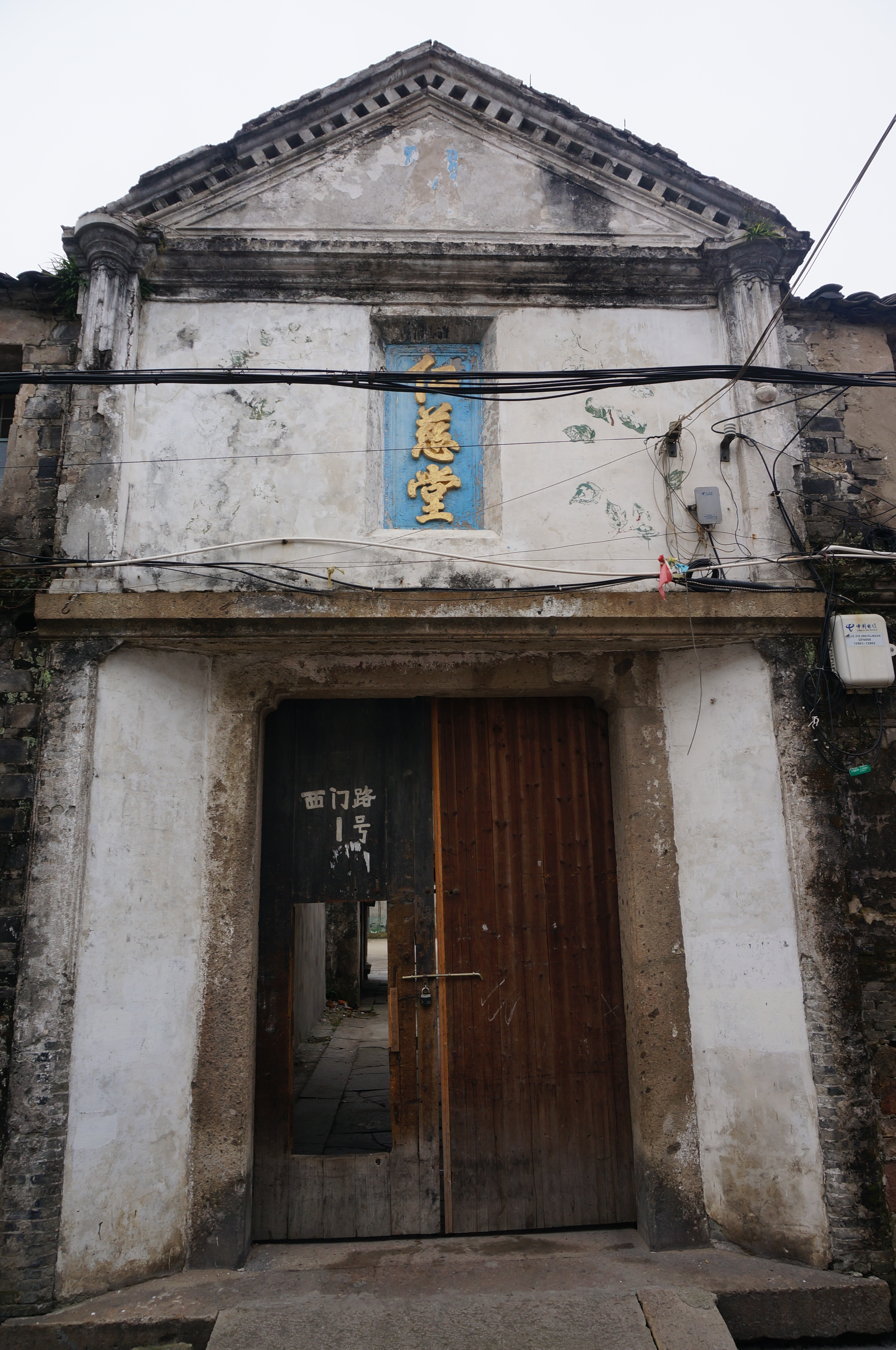
The gate for women.

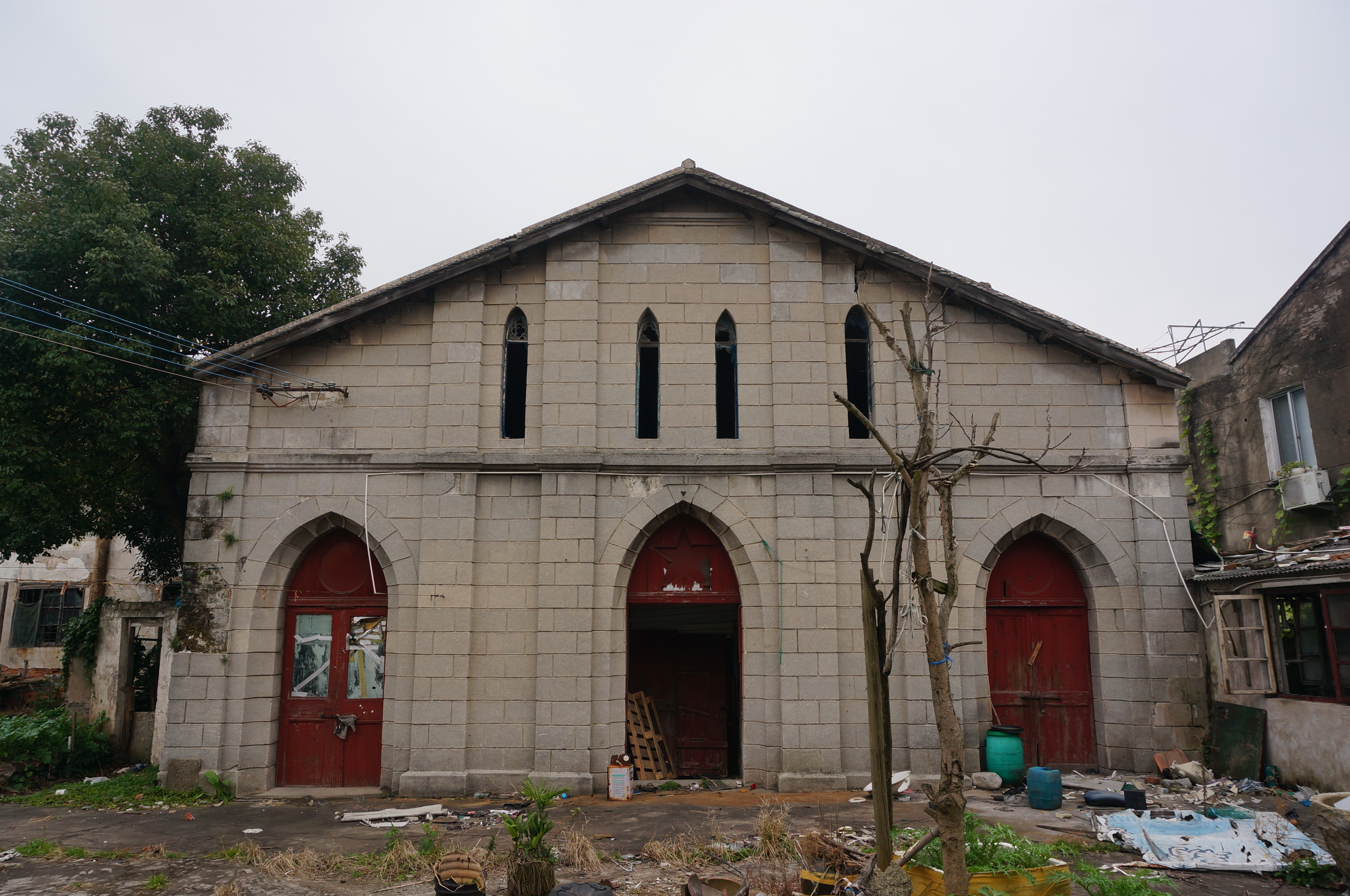
Holy House of Mercy.
