= Peter Shao Zhumin =

- Bishop of the Roman Catholic Diocese of Yongjia
- Church: Cathedral of St Paul in Wenzhou
- Province: Zhejiang
- Diocese: Roman Catholic Diocese of Yongjia
- Installed: 2016
- Predecessor: Vincent Zhu Wei-Fang

Orders
- Ordination: 10 August 1989
- Consecration: 10 November 2011 by Vincent Zhu Wei-Fang

Personal details
- Born: 10 September 1963 (age 62) China
- Denomination: Roman Catholic

Chinese name
- Chinese: 邵祝敏
Transcriptions
Standard Mandarin
- Hanyu Pinyin: Shào Zhùmǐn

Peter Shao Zhumin (Chinese: 邵祝敏; born 10 September 1963) is a Chinese Catholic priest and Bishop of the Roman Catholic Diocese of Yongjia since 2016.

== Biography ==
He was ordained a priest on 10 August 1989. He received the episcopacy with a papal mandate in December 2007 and was consecrated on 10 November 2011. On 7 September 2016, after the death of his predecessor Vincent Zhu Wei-Fang, he became Bishop of Yongji.

In June 2017 he was arrested by the local government.

In January 2024 he was reported arrested again after protesting changes in his diocese made by a replacement appointed by the Chinese government.

Catholic Church titles
Previous: Vincent Zhu Wei-Fang	Bishop of the Roman Catholic Diocese of Yongjia; 2016–	Incumbent
