= Choria =

Town of ancient Lydia

Coordinates: 38°46′33″N 27°52′42″E

Choria was a town of ancient Lydia, inhabited during Roman and Byzantine times. Its name does not occur among ancient authors, but is inferred from epigraphic and other evidence.

Its site is located near Selendi in Asiatic Turkey.
