= Diocese of Linhai =

Roman Catholic diocese in China

Diocese of Taizhou Dioecesis Taeceuvensis 天主教台州教区
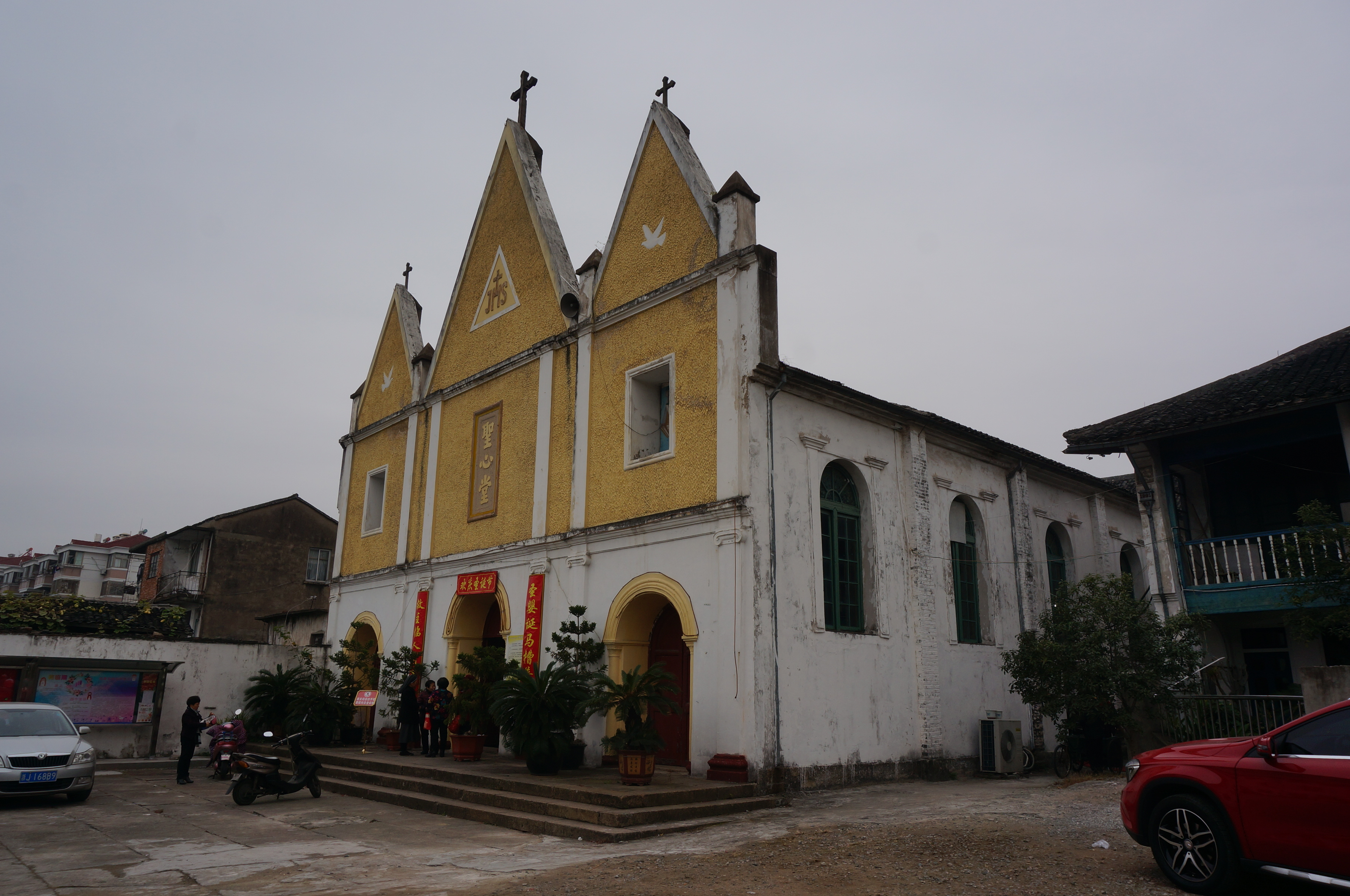
- Sacred Heart Cathedral in Taizhou, the seat of the diocese

Location
- Country: China
- Ecclesiastical province: Hangzhou
- Metropolitan: Hangzhou

Statistics
- Area: 3,135 km^{2} (1,210 sq mi)
- Population: Total; Catholics: (as of 1950); 2,000,000; 7,734 (0.4%)

Information
- Rite: Latin Rite
- Cathedral: Sacred Heart Cathedral, Jiaojiang

Current leadership
- Pope: Leo XIV
- Bishop: vacant
- Metropolitan Archbishop: Sede Vacante

The Roman Catholic Diocese of Taizhou/Linhai (Latin: Taeceuven(sis), Chinese: 台州, 臨海) is a diocese located in the city of Taizhou, Zhejiang in the ecclesiastical province of Hangzhou in China.

== History ==
- August 10, 1926: Established as Apostolic Vicariate of Taizhou 台州 from the Apostolic Vicariate of Ningbo 寧波
- April 11, 1946: Promoted as Diocese of Taizhou 台州

== Leadership ==
- Bishops of Taizhou 台州 (Roman rite)
  - Bishop Anthony Xu Ji-wei (2010 - September 25, 2016)
  - Bishop Joseph Hu Jo-shan, C.M. (胡若山) (April 11, 1946 – August 28, 1962)
- Vicars Apostolic of Taizhou 台州 (Roman Rite)
  - Bishop Joseph Hu Jo-shan, C.M. (胡若山) (July 30, 1926 – April 11, 1946)
