= Chantenay-sur-Loire =

Former commune in France

- Commune
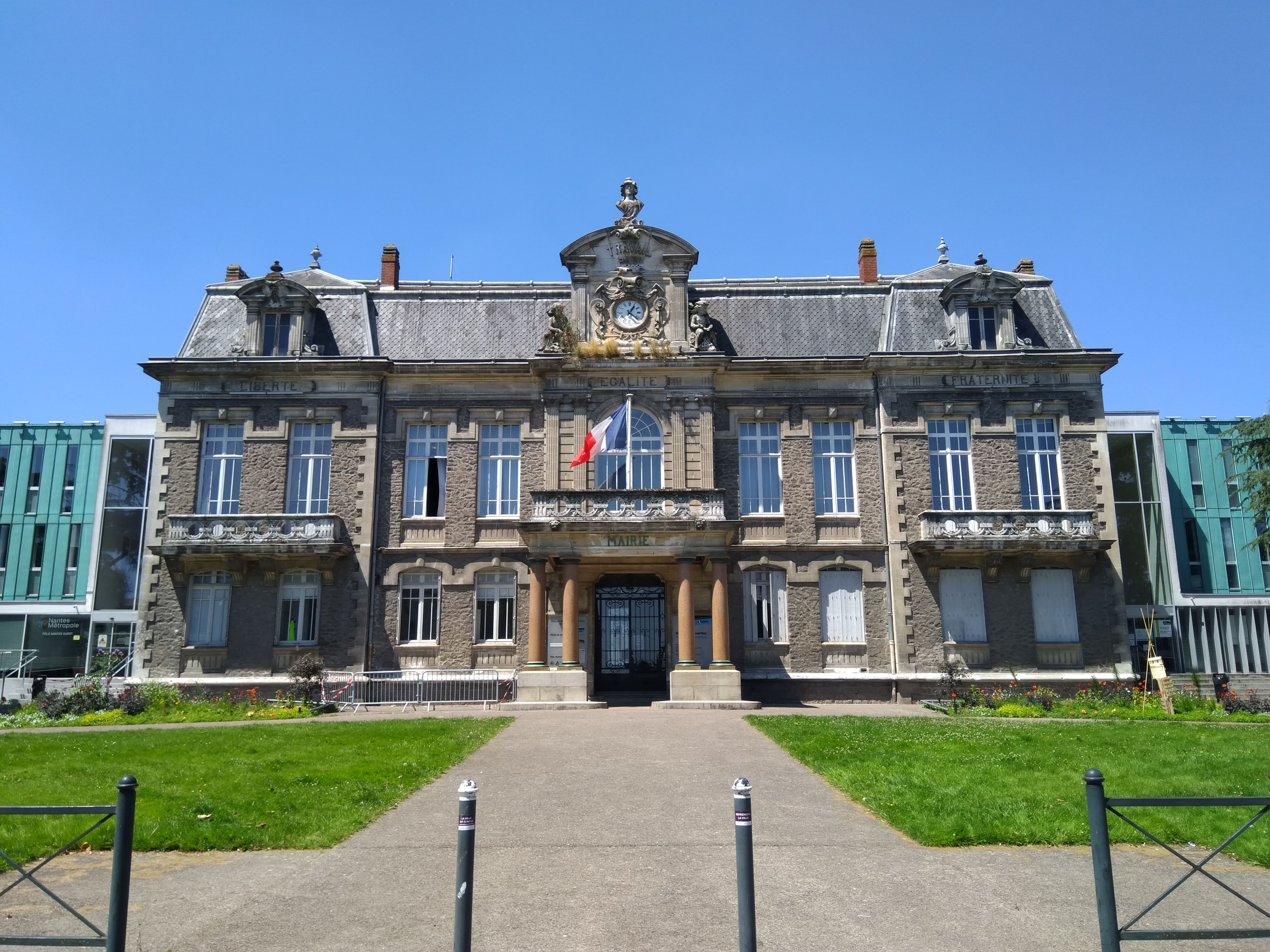
- Former Chantenay town hall now annexed to the Hôtel de Ville in Nantes.

- Location within France
- Coordinates: 47°12′25″N 1°35′42″W
- Country: France
- Region: Pays de la Loire
- Department: Loire-Inférieure
- City: Nantes
- Annexation: April 4, 1908
- Demonym(s): Chantenaysian, Chantenaysienne
- Area code: 44100

Chantenay-sur-Loire (French pronunciation: [ʃɑ̃tnɛ syʁ lwaʁ], lit. 'Chantenay on Loire') is a former commune of Loire-Inférieure, located on the right bank of the Loire River, on the west side of Nantes, annexed to the latter in 1908 along with the commune of Doulon. The territory is currently divided between the Bellevue – Chantenay – Sainte-Anne and Dervallières – Zola districts.

== Toponymy ==
=== Origin of the name ===
The name "Chantenay" derives from the Latin Cantenacum or Villa Canteni, from the patronymic Cantenos, the name of a wealthy Gallo-Roman landowner who owned a vast estate here, around which the village grew. The Bulletin des lois of 1801 mentions the spellings "Chantenay" and "Chantenai". The use of "Chantenay-sur-Loire" came into force after its publication in the Bulletin des lois in 1887. Chantenay-lès-Nantes" is also found in 19th-century civil registers.

Since its incorporation into the commune of Nantes, the terms "-sur-Loire" and "-lès-Nantes" have been abandoned, and the toponym "Chantenay" now designates all the old districts of the former commune, as does "Bas-Chantenay", which designates those located closest to the Loire.

In Gallo, the local langue d'oïl, Chantenay is said [ ʃãtnaj] or [ʃɛ̃tnaj] and spelled Chantnai in the ABCD script or Chantnài in the ELG script.

=== Use of the name "Chantenay" ===
The name Chantenay (on the Loire) is used to designate at least two products:

- "Chantenay carrots", apparently known even in English-speaking countries4 due to their large size;
- "Chantenay varnish", used to coat the inside of tin cans, developed by Jean-Baptiste Georget, mayor of Chantenay from 1871.

== History ==
=== The origins (11th–15th century) ===
A Benedictine abbey, part of the Saint-Melaine abbey near Rennes, was established in the 11th century.

In the 13th century, the monks served a parish church, Saint-Martin, whose jurisdiction was bounded by the Loire, the Misery rock (now the "Butte Sainte-Anne"), and the Chézine. A presbytery was built in the 15th century, which still exists today.

=== The parish of Saint-Martin de Chantenay ===
The parish of Saint-Martin subsequently became a secular parish, under the authority of the bishop of Nantes. Available parish registers start in 1567.

The seigneury of La Hautière is located on the Misery hillock; from the 15th century onwards, the lords exploited the quarry at the foot of the hillock. Quarries were also exploited to the north of the parish, around today's Place Émile-Zola.

To the northwest of the parish are the de Derval family estate, with a residence and later a château, les Dervallières; the Carcouet and du Tillay seigneuries.

The Benedictine abbey became a secular estate, which passed into the hands of various families, under the name of "Domaine de l'Abbaye".

=== Acadian refugees in the 18th century ===
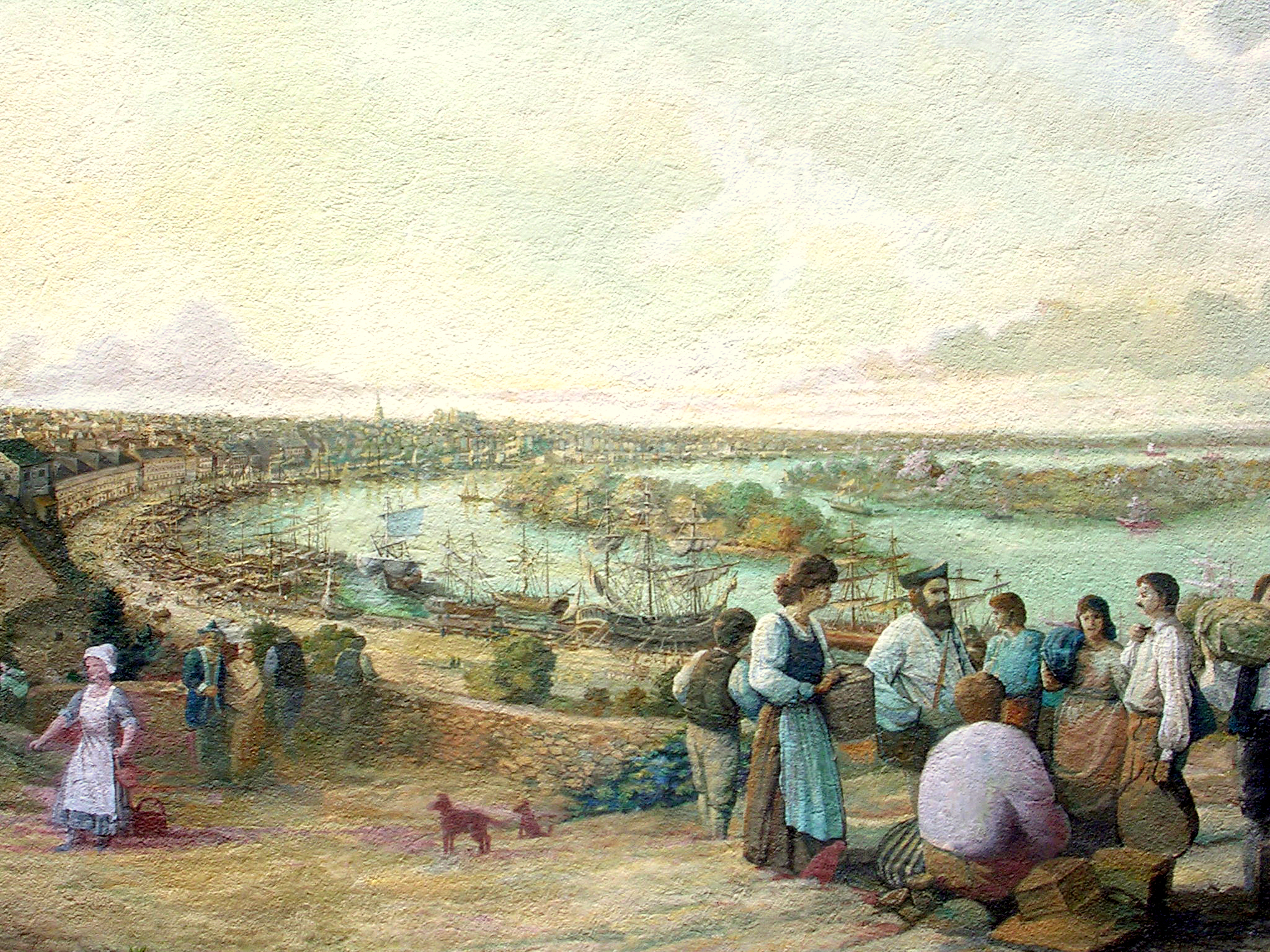
Mémorial des Acadiens, fresco by Robert Dafford.

A particular episode in Chantenay's history was the settlement of a large community of Acadians in the parish for several years.

Acadia (now Nova Scotia) was ceded to England in 1713. In 1755, the English government decided to deport Acadians of French origin (the "Grand Dérangement"); many of them were detained in England during the Seven Years' War, then repatriated to France in 1763, notably to Poitou. In 1775, a group of over a thousand arrived in Nantes, hoping to set sail for the New World.

Waiting to embark for Louisiana, still a French colony at the time, they spread out among various parishes but were particularly numerous in Chantenay. Of the 1202 civil status records concerning them, from 1775 to 1785, 545 come from the Saint-Martin parish. On the whole, these Acadians (generally quite young people) received no official assistance. They integrated to a greater or lesser extent since half of all recorded Acadian marriages were to metropolitans. In 1785, a large group left the region, but some settled permanently.

This event is commemorated by a plaque on Saint-Martin church, and, more recently, by the fresco of the Acadians, painted in 1993 by Louisiana artist Robert Dafford.

=== Contemporary times ===
==== Revolution and Empire ====
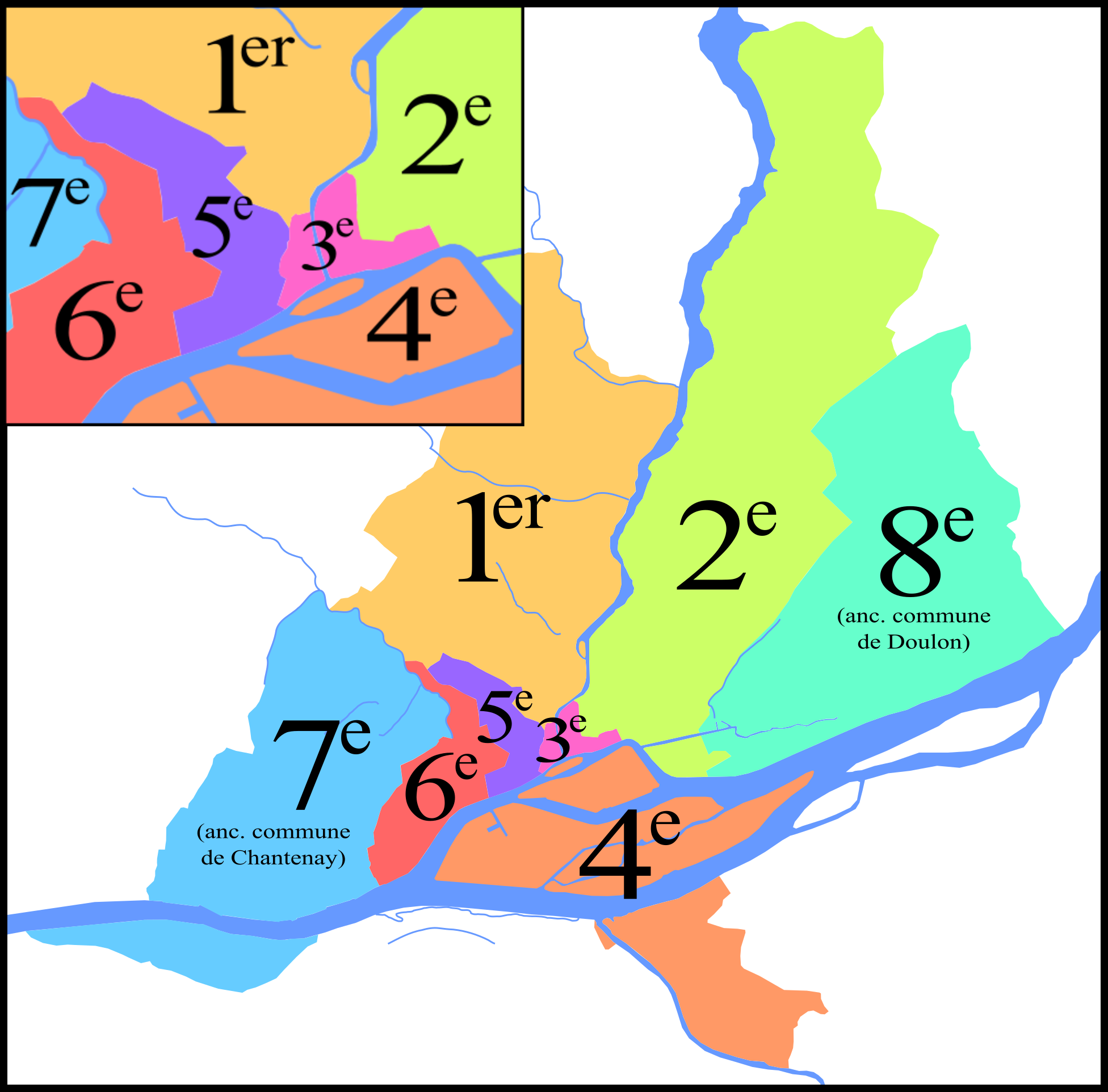
Map of Nantes arrondissements in 1926, the former commune of Chantenay corresponds to the 7th.

In early 1790, Chantenay became a commune, its boundaries initially corresponding to those of the parish of Saint-Martin. A little later, the still sparsely populated Misery rock was incorporated into the commune of Nantes.

During the Terror, when Nantes was under the direction of the representative Jean-Baptiste Carrier, the Misery quarry was a place of execution for prisoners of the routed Vendée army. Many of these prisoners died of disease (typhus) or were executed by shooting or drowning.

==== The Crucy shipyard ====
At the same time, Chantenay saw the beginnings of its industrial development.

In 1796, brothers Louis and Antoine Crucy (brothers of Nantes architect Mathurin Crucy) set up a shipyard here, generally known as the chantier de la Piperie. The Crucy family had already had a shipyard in Basse-Indre since 1793. The Chantenay yard is considerable, measuring around 560 m in length. The site, to the west of Les Salorges, had been under consideration for several decades, with Mathurin Crucy having drawn up a project in the 1780s. In 1790, 9 lots were cut out, but only one was sold. The town then suspended the operation, which was not resumed until 1796; the remaining 8 lots were then purchased by the company formed by Louis and Antoine Crucy, which Mathurin joined in the following years.

==== Port activities ====
The port of Nantes employed a large workforce, particularly in coal trading, around the "Blanzy-Ouest" chipboard factory.

==== Shipyards ====
Chantenay was home to several shipyards over the century:

- Hubert Baudoux shipyards;
- Crucy shipyards
- Dubigeon shipyards, to which the black crane testifies;
- Nouveaux chantiers nantais de Chantenay, founded around 1900.

==== The social evolution of Chantenay and the Nantes district of Sainte-Anne ====
Chantenay and the Sainte-Anne district of Nantes are home to some of the poorest working classes in the Nantes conurbation, particularly as a result of immigration from Lower Brittany.

In 1872, three-quarters of Sainte-Anne's 4,400 inhabitants were born in Loire-Inférieure, while the vast majority of the remaining 25% came from the 4 other Breton départements (although Ille-et-Vilaine was relatively under-represented), most of them Breton speakers; only 2% came from Vendée and 6% from other départements. The Sainte-Anne district, overcrowded and very poor, was considered one of Nantes' "insalubrious" districts (along with Marchix near Saint-Similien church), but it wasn't until around 1900 that an effort was made to improve housing with the first low-cost housing (HBM).

In Chantenay (population 9,860 at the time), the Ville-en-Bois neighborhood included 20% immigrants from Lower Brittany (mainly from Cornouaille), the Saint-Martin neighborhood 12%, and the still rural western neighborhoods much less. Bas-Bretons are particularly numerous in the less skilled trades (laborers, porters, etc.).

Chantenay's demographic growth led to the creation of a second parish, Saint-Clair, in 1858. However, the commune soon became a hotbed of the Nantes labor movement, particularly during several strikes in the 19th century. In 1896, it was here that the Fédération (nationale) des ouvriers ferblantiers was formed.

==== Sainte-Anne: from Misery rock to the Butte Sainte-Anne ====
In religious terms, Misery was part of the parish of Saint-Martin until the mid-19th century. However, population growth, including in the outlying districts of Nantes, led to the creation of a new parish in 1846, dedicated to Saint Anne, patron saint of Brittany. This was accompanied by an urban transformation, with the construction of the church of Sainte-Anne (architect: Joseph-Fleury Chenantais) and the development of the surrounding area by Nantes' architecte-voyer, Henri Driollet: esplanade, staircase to the Quai Marquis-d'Aiguillon, installation of the statue of the saint.

The Catholic Church used Sainte-Anne parish as a means of maintaining the Christianization of the population, organizing a novena for the patron saint's day as early as 1848; in 1851, the first outdoor procession took place; in 1872, Sainte-Anne de Nantes was established as a place of pilgrimage to replace Sainte-Anne d'Auray.

Nevertheless, in 1896, voters in the Sainte-Anne district sent three Socialist councilors to the Nantes mayor's office for the five seats at their disposal, including Charles Brunellière.

==== The annexation of Chantenay by Nantes ====
The question of relations between Nantes and Chantenay resurfaced at the end of the 19th century, with the industrialization of the Mellinet-Launay district to the west of Nantes and the installation of Nantes urban facilities on Chantenay territory: the Contrie reservoir, and above all the western section of the "boulevard de ceinture" (now boulevard de la Liberté, boulevard de l'Égalité, boulevard de la Fraternité, ....), built between 1870 and 1895.

The creation of a Nantes reservoir on Chantenay territory was negotiated by perfume manufacturer Paul-Émile Sarradin with his Chantenay colleague Prosper Sevestre, from another industrialist family. However, in the 1900 elections, Chantenay's mayor was a much more left-wing municipality, led by the radical Paul Griveaud and allied with socialists. Relations between the two municipalities were tense. The installation of the Contrie reservoir gave rise to a municipal war, with Nantes forbidding Chantenay to use its water; symbolically, Paul-Émile Sarradin did not invite the Griveaud municipality to the reservoir inauguration but invited representatives of the opposition.

The prospect of annexing Chantenay was present throughout Paul-Émile Sarradin's term of office, while the Griveaud municipality was opposed to it. On the Nantes city council, only Charles Brunellière and the Socialists tried to defend Chantenay, which went so far as to inaugurate a new town hall on Place de la Liberté on September 4, 1903, in the presence of Camille Pelletan, Minister of Marine in the Émile Combes government.

The merger was finally settled by the law of April 3, 1908, which dissolved the municipal councils of Nantes, Chantenay, and Doulon, temporarily replacing them with a special delegation responsible for organizing municipal elections in the new commune of Nantes. This delegation, chaired by a prefectural official, Joseph Canal, was made up mainly of civil servants. Its mandate lasted only from April 4 to May 17, 1908, the date of installation of the new mayor of Nantes, Gabriel Guist'hau.

Chantenay, like Doulon, retains a special status within the commune of Nantes: the Chantenay town hall becomes an "annex town hall" and the municipality appoints a "special deputy". Since the 2008 municipal elections, no special deputy has been appointed.

== Demographics ==
Demographic evolution from 1793 to 1856
| 1793 | 1800 | 1806 | 1821 | 1831 | 1841 | 1846 | 1851 | 1856 |
|---|---|---|---|---|---|---|---|---|
| 2 400 | 2 461 | 1 801 | 2 602 | 2 901 | 3 935 | 4 691 | 4 966 | 5 972 |

Demographic evolution from 1861 to 1906
| 1861 | 1866 | 1872 | 1876 | 1881 | 1886 | 1891 | 1896 | 1901 | 1906 |
|---|---|---|---|---|---|---|---|---|---|
| 7 252 | 9 066 | 9 860 | 9 953 | 11 808 | 12 524 | 14 139 | 16 264 | 20 163 | 21 671 |

== Geography ==
=== Physical geography ===
Chantenay lies at the southern end of the Sillon de Bretagne, at the point where the bed of the Loire narrows at the level of the Butte Sainte-Anne. The old village of Chantenay overlooks the Loire by some twenty meters.

=== Human geography ===
The Bellevue-Chantenay district is now fully urbanized.

==== Chantenay ====
Several neighborhoods can be distinguished:

- The old center (the "bourg"), around Saint-Martin church and the Saint-Martin cemetery;
- The modern center, around the town hall and its main square, with the star-shaped Place de la Nation nearby;
- The Saint-Clair church district.

==== Lower Chantenay ====
Several sectors occupy the flat area between the Loire River and the Chantenay hillside, at the foot of which the Nantes-Saint-Nazaire railroad line passes through the Chantenay tunnel; from downstream to upstream:

- The Roche-Maurice port, at Cheviré bridge level, the first upstream element of the Port Autonome, with the Cheviré port opposite (note that the Cheviré area comes under the jurisdiction of the Nantes municipality and has been included, at least formally, in the Bellevue-Chantenay district);
- The industrial zone along the Loire, characterized by the presence of several large-scale brownfield sites; it also includes a nautical center (rue Réaumur) and the former Levesque factory;
- The boulevard de Cardiff – boulevard de Chantenay sector, corresponding to the 19th-century port, with residential blocks adjacent to economic sites: the former Dejoie foundry, the Caroff vinegar factory (still in operation) to the north of boulevard de Cardiff, and the Nantes Métropole depot near the Loire, among others. This area is marked by the memory of the Crucy shipyards: rue de la Cale-Crucy, impasse Crucy, rue des Chantiers-de-Crucy, and rue de la Piperie. The former Crucy slipway is still there (and indicated on the plans), but is not at all promoted from a tourist point of view. On the other bank of the Loire, you can see the village of Trentemoult in Rezé.

== River shuttles ==
Chantenay was the site of the construction of the Roquio, the first of a series of eight steamships operated by the Compagnie de Navigation de la Basse-Loire, providing passenger service between Nantes and the fishing village of Trentemoult between 1887 and 1958. The name Chantenay was given to one of these river shuttles.

This name was later used for the second Navibus to operate on the Loire, on June 17, 2006, providing a link between the Gare Maritime pontoon in Nantes and the Trentemoult pontoon.

== Places and monuments ==
=== Bas-Chantenay ===
- Former Misery quarry. Bounded by a rocky cliff some twenty meters high, it is overgrown with broom. Traces of the Burgelin brewery, which became "La Meuse" until its definitive closure in the summer of 1985, notably the ruined outer wall covered in tags along its fifty-meter length.
- Rizerie Levesque, established by Louis-Auguste Levesque in 1860 and operating until 1939 (rue Réaumur, in the industrial zone).

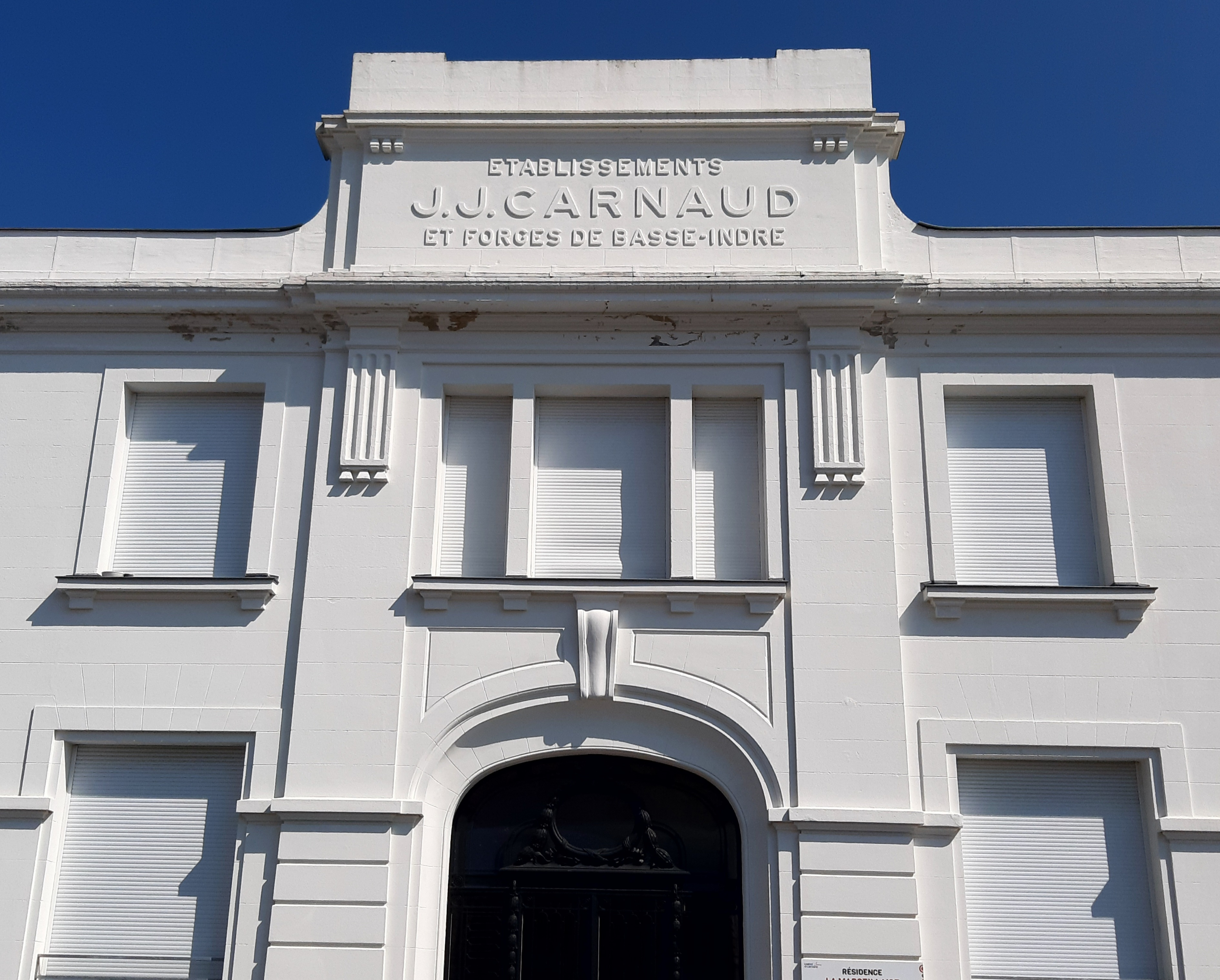
Facade of the former J.J. Carnaud factory, Forges de Basse-Indre, now Résidence La Marseillaise

=== Old village ===
- Domaine de l'Abbaye: the site of today's Lycée Notre-Dame de l'Abbaye was, from the 11th to the 15th century, the site of a Benedictine abbey, a subsidiary of Saint-Méen Abbey, then a secular estate where, in the early 18th century, the Goyon family (see Personalities) built a manor house known as "Château de l'Abbaye", restored in the 19th and 20th centuries.
- Saint-Martin church and adjoining cemetery.
- Presbytery, built in the 15th century (rue des Réformés)
- Chinese Pavilion villa.

=== North-west sector (Dervallières, Carcouët) ===
- Château de Carcouët, built in the 15th century and developed until the 19th century, was demolished in 1970 to build a secondary school, initially a collège, now Lycée Carcouët; surviving element: a staircase in the park.
- Château des Dervallières, built in the 15th century and rebuilt in the 19th, was demolished in the 1980s, its park having been largely used for the construction of low-cost housing estates in the 1950s and 1960s; a few elements remain, notably the dovecote.

== See also ==
- Loire-Atlantique
- Communes of France
- Nantes

== Bibliography ==
- Siège de la Société Académique (1982). "Chantenay hier et aujourd'hui". Annales de Nantes et du Pays nantais (in French).
- Pinson, Daniel (1984). L'Indépendance confisquée d'une ville ouvrière Chantenay (in French). Éditions ACL.
- Duperray, Alain (2001). "Sainte Anne la Bretonne, Chantenay la Rouge ?". La Mémoire d’une ville. 20 images de Nantes (in French). Nantes-Histoire/Skol Vreizh.
- Olart, Catherine (2009). Nantes secret et insolite (in French). Éditions Les Beaux Jours.
- Croix, Alain (2007). Nantais venus d'ailleurs, Histoire des étrangers à Nantes des origines à nos jours (in French). Nantes-Histoire/Presses universitaires de Rennes.
- Braud, G.-M. (1999). Les Acadiens en France : Nantes et Paimbœuf (in French). Approche généalogique.
