= Diocese of Zhoucun =

Catholic diocese in China

Diocese of Zhoucun Dioecesis Ceuziienensis 教周村教区

Catholic

Location
- Country: China
- Metropolitan: Archdiocese of Jinan
- Headquarters: Zhoucun, Shandong, China

Statistics
- Area: 5,000 km^{2} (1,900 sq mi)
- Population: Total; Catholics: (as of 1950); 3,000,000; 29,411 (1.0%)
- Parishes: 17

Information
- Denomination: Catholic Church
- Sui iuris church: Latin Church
- Rite: Roman Rite
- Established: 16 April 1929; 97 years ago
- Cathedral: Cathedral in Zhoucun, Shandong

Current leadership
- Pope: Leo XIV
- Bishop: Sede vacante
- Metropolitan Archbishop: Joseph Zhang Xianwang

The Diocese of Zhoucun (Chowtsun) (Latin: Dioecesis Ceuziienensis, Chinese: 教周村教区) is a Latin Catholic diocese of the Catholic Church located in Zhoucun (Zibo) in the ecclesiastical province of Jinan in China.

== History ==
- 16 April 1929: Established as Mission "sui iuris" of Zhangdian 張店 from the Apostolic Vicariate of Tsinanfu 濟南府
- 1 June 1932: Promoted as Apostolic Prefecture of Zhangdian 張店
- 18 May 1937: Promoted as Apostolic Vicariate of Zhoucun 周村
- 11 April 1946: Promoted as Diocese of Zhoucun 周村

== Leadership ==
Ecclesiastical Superior of Zhangdian 張店 (Roman Rite)

- Henry Ambrose Pinger, O.F.M. (17 December 1930 – 10 June 1932 see below)

Prefect Apostolic of Zhangdian 張店 (Roman Rite)

- Henry Ambrose Pinger, O.F.M. (see above 10 June 1932 – 18 May 1937 see below)

Vicar Apostolic of Zhoucun 周村 (Roman Rite)

- Henry Ambrose Pinger, O.F.M. (see above 18 May 1937 – 11 April 1946 see below)

Bishops of Zhoucun 周村 (Roman rite)

- Henry Ambrose Pinger, O.F.M. (11 April 1946 – 1983), resigned
- John Gao Kexian (3 September 1993 – 24 January 2005)
- Joseph Ma Xue-sheng (27 June 1997 – 8 February 2013)
- Joseph Yang Yongqiang (8 February 2013 – 12 June 2024), appointed Bishop of Hangzhou
