= Joseph Ma Xue-sheng =

Catholic bishop

- Bishop of Zhoucun
- Native name: 馬學聖
- Church: Catholic Church
- Diocese: Diocese of Zhoucun
- In office: June 27, 1997 – February 8, 2013
- Predecessor: John Gao Ke-xian
- Successor: Joseph Yang Yongqiang
- Previous post: Coadjutor Bishop of Zhoucun (1988-1997)

Orders
- Ordination: 1957
- Consecration: April 24, 1988 by Joseph Zong Huaide

Personal details
- Born: 16 September 1923 Zouping, Shandong, Republic of China
- Died: 8 February 2013 (aged 89)

Joseph Ma Xue-sheng (September 16, 1923 – February 8, 2013) was a Catholic bishop.

Born in China, Ma Xue-sheng was ordained a priest on April 3, 1957. On April 24, 1988, he was clandestinely consecrated auxiliary bishop of the Diocese of Zhoucun. From 1997 until his death he was a bishop ordinary at the same diocese.

Catholic Church titles
Previous: John Gao Ke-xian	Bishop of the Roman Catholic Diocese of Zhoucun; 1997-2013	Next: Joseph Yang Yongqiang
