= Silandus =

Episcopal city in the late Roman province of Lydia

Coordinates: 38°45′13″N 28°49′24″E

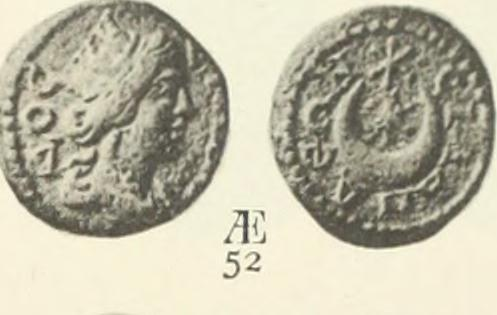
Silandus coin
| ϹΙΛΑΝ ΔΟϹ-Bust of city goddess r., turreted; border of dots | ϹΙΛΑΝΔΕΩΝ-Star of six rays within crescent; above, another star of six rays; border dots |
Coin from Silandus, era Septimus Sevirus or Caracalla.

Silandus or Silandos (Ancient Greek: Σιλάνδος) was an episcopal city in the late Roman province of Lydia. It was near and gave its name to the present town of Selendi in Manisa Province, Turkey.

== Historical diocese ==
The see of Silandus, a suffragan of the see of Sardis, is mentioned in the Greek Notitiae episcopatuum until the 13th century; the city is not mentioned by any ancient geographer or historian. Some of its coins survive, showing representations of the River Hermus. Some inscriptions but no ruins are now found there.

=== Residential Bishops ===
The list of bishops of Silandus given by Le Quien, Oriens christianus, I, 881, needs correction:

- Markus, present at the Council of Nicaea, 325;
- Alcimedes at Chalcedon, 451;
- Andreas, at the Council of Constantinople 680; Stephanus, at Constantinople, 787;
- Eustathius, at Constantinople, 879.

The bishop mentioned as having taken part in the Council of Constantinople, 1351, belongs to the See of Synaus.

== Inscriptions ==
Two funerary inscriptions from the Roman Imperial period have been recorded from Karaselendi, the site of ancient Silandos. One is the left part of a marble pedimental stele, with all akroteria broken off. Decorative elements include two leaves in the lower corners and a rosette in the center of the pediment, as well as a wreath above the inscription. The preserved text records that in 116/117 CE, Diomedes, son of Philippos, honored his wife, whose name ends in -pe. A second inscription, from the lower piece of a marble stele also found at Karaselendi, is dated to 217/218 CE. The inscription states that Telesphoros and Apphias, the parents, honored Telesphoris mneias charin ("in memory").

== Titular bishopric ==
The bishopric was nominally revived in 1900 as a Latin titular see of the lowest (episcopal) rank, but is vacant since 1968, after only two incumbents:

- Bishop Próspero París (姚宗李), S.J. (1900.04.06 – 1931.05.13)
- Bishop James Albert Duffy (1931.05.07 – 1968.02.12)
