= Auguste Haouissée =

French prelate (1877-1948)

Auguste Haouissée SJ
- Bishop of Shanghai
- Church: Catholic Church
- Diocese: Diocese of Shanghai
- In office: 13 December 1933 – 10 September 1948
- Predecessor: Vicariate erected
- Successor: Ignatius Kung Pin-Mei
- Previous posts: Titular Bishop of Cercina (1928-1946); Vicar Apostolic of Nanjing (1931-1933); Coadjutor Vicar Apostolic of Nanjing (1928-1931)

Orders
- Ordination: 10 June 1910
- Consecration: 3 October 1928 by Henri Lécroart

Personal details
- Born: Auguste Alphonse Pierre Haouisée; 1 October 1877 Évran, Côtes-du-Nord, France
- Died: 10 September 1948 (aged 70) Shanghai, Republic of China

Styles of Auguste Haouisée
- Reference style: The Most Reverend
- Spoken style: Your Excellency
- Religious style: Monsignor
- Posthumous style: none

Auguste Haouisée, SJ (Chinese: 惠濟良; pinyin: Huì Jìliáng; 1 October 1877 – 10 September 1948) was a French prelate of the Catholic Church, who served as Bishop of Shanghai from 1946 until his death, having previously served as its Apostolic Vicar.

Born in Évran, he was ordained as a Jesuit priest on 10 June 1910.

On 25 June 1928 Haouisée was appointed Coadjutor Apostolic Vicar of Nanking, and Titular Bishop of Cercina on 2 July that year. He received his episcopal consecration on the following 3 October from Bishop Henry Lécroart, SJ, with Bishops Adéodat-Roch Wittner, OFM, and André-François Defebvre, CM, serving as co-consecrators. Haouisée succeeded his fellow Jesuit, the late Próspero París, as Apostolic Vicar of Nanking on 13 May 1931.

Pope Pius XI later translated him to the first Apostolic Vicar of Shanghai on 13 December 1933. Upon his vicariate's elevation to a diocese on 11 April 1946, the Jesuit prelate became Bishop of Shanghai.

Haouisée died at age 70.

== Notes ==
| Preceded by Próspero París, SJ | Apostolic Vicar of Nanking; 1931–1933 | Succeeded by Paul Yü Pin |
| Preceded by New diocese | Bishop of Shanghai; 1933–1948 | Succeeded by Ignatius Kung |
