= Joseph Yang Yongqiang =

Archbishop of Hangzhou

- Archbishop of Hangzhou
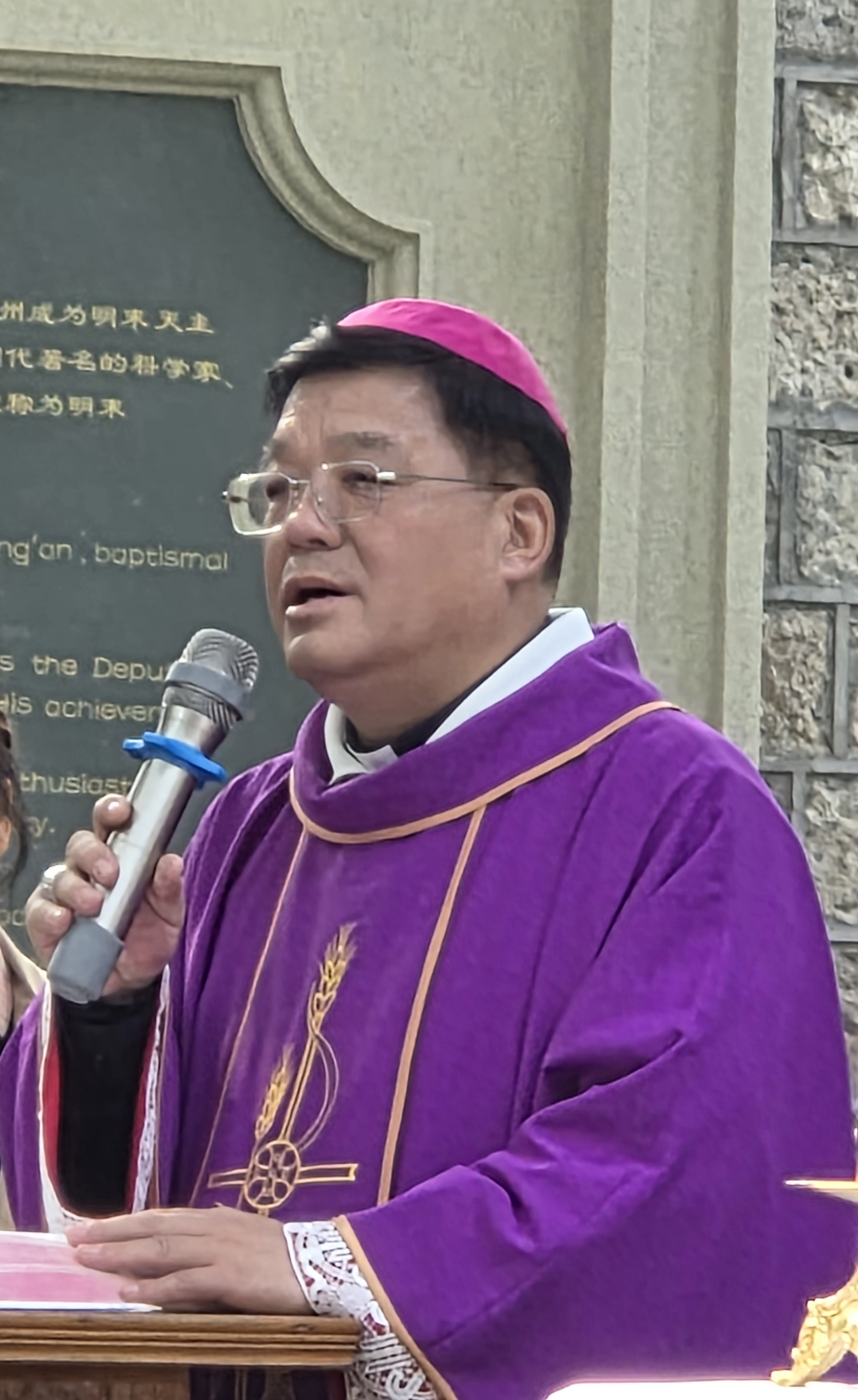
- Archdiocese: Hangzhou
- Appointed: 12 June 2024
- Predecessor: Joseph Ma Xue-sheng
- Previous posts: Coadjutor Bishop of Zhoucun (2010-2013); Bishop of Zhoucan (2013–2024

Orders
- Ordination: 5 June 1995
- Consecration: 15 November 2010 by John Fang Xing Yao

Personal details
- Born: April 11, 1970 (age 56) Boxing, China
- Denomination: Roman Catholic
- Motto: Filius hominis non venit ministrari sed ministrare
- Coat of arms

Chinese name
- Traditional Chinese: 楊永強
- Simplified Chinese: 杨永强
Transcriptions
Standard Mandarin
- Hanyu Pinyin: Yáng Yǒngqiáng

Joseph Yang Yongqiang (Chinese: 杨永强; born 11 April 1970) is a Chinese prelate of the Catholic Church who has been appointed archbishop of Hangzhou. He was bishop of Zhoucun from 2013 to 2024, after more than two years as coadjutor there.

== Biography ==
He was born on 11 April 1970 in Boxing County (Shandong). He studied at Holy Spirit Seminary in Shandong and at the seminary of Sheshan in Shanghai. He was ordained a priest on 5 June 1995.

After fulfilling a number of pastoral assignments, he continued his studies at the National Seminary of Beijing and then taught at Holy Spirit Seminary in Shandong.

He was named coadjutor bishop of Zhoucun on 15 November 2010 and received his episcopal consecration on 15 November 2010. On 8 February 2013 he succeeded Bishop Joseph Ma Xuesheng as bishop of Zhoucun.

In December 2016 he was elected vice-president of the Catholic Patriotic Association.

He participated in the Synod of Bishops on Synodality in October 2023. Pope Francis had selected him and Bishop Anthony Yao Shun from a list provided by the government of China, which granted the two bishops limited visa, which the bishops overstayed before leaving the Synod early.

On 12 June 2024, Pope Francis approved Yang's transfer to the Archdiocese of Hangchow with the rank of metropolitan archbishop.

Catholic Church titles
Preceded by Joseph Ma Xue-sheng	Bishop of Zhoucan; 2013–2024	Vacant
Preceded by Matthew Cao Xiangde	Archbishop of Hangzhou; 2024–	Incumbent
