= Diocese of Lishui =

Roman Catholic diocese in China

Diocese of Lishui Dioecesis Liscioeivensis 天主教丽水教区

Location
- Country: China
- Ecclesiastical province: Hangzhou
- Metropolitan: Hangzhou

Statistics
- Area: 23,484 km^{2} (9,067 sq mi)
- Population: Total; Catholics: (as of 1950); 3,309,300; 4,286 (0.1%)

Information
- Rite: Latin Rite
- Cathedral: Former Cathedral of the Sacred Heart in Lishui, Zhejiang

Current leadership
- Pope: Leo XIV
- Bishop: Sede Vacante
- Metropolitan Archbishop: Sede Vacante

The Roman Catholic Diocese of Lishui (Latin: Liscioëiven(sis), Chinese: 麗水) is a diocese located in the city of Lishui in the ecclesiastical province of Hangzhou in China.

== History ==
- July 2, 1931: Established as Apostolic Prefecture of Chuzhou from the Apostolic Vicariate of Ningbo 寧波
- May 18, 1937: Renamed as Apostolic Prefecture of Lishui 麗水
- May 28, 1937: Promoted as Apostolic Vicariate of Lishui 麗水
- May 13, 1948: Promoted as Diocese of Lishui 麗水

== Leadership ==
- Bishops of Lishui 麗水 (Roman rite)
  - Bishop Kenneth Roderick Turner, S.F.M. (May 13, 1948 – October 31, 1983)
- Vicars Apostolic of Lishui 麗水 (Roman Rite)
  - Fr. William Cecil MacGrath, S.F.M. (March 4, 1932 – 1941)
