= James Lin Xili =

Chinese underground Roman Catholic bishop

James Lin Xili (林錫黎; October 19, 1918 – October 4, 2009) was a Chinese underground Roman Catholic bishop of Wenzhou. His 1992 ordination as the First Bishop of Wenzhou was never recognized by the government of the People's Republic of China.

Lin Xili was born in Yueqing, China, on October 19, 1918. Lin enrolled in the St Vincent Seminary in the Roman Catholic Diocese of Ningbo in 1931. He was first ordained a Roman Catholic priest on June 3, 1944, and enrolled in the Fu Jen Catholic University in Beijing just three months later. He graduated from the university in 1948.

Lin returned to the Diocese of Ningbo, where he worked as the principal of a diocesan Catholic school until 1955. Bishop Andre-Jean-Francois Defebvre of Ningbo named Lin one of the diocese's administrators during the 1950s. He was arrested by the Communist Chinese government in 1955 and sentenced to sixteen years of hard labor for "counter-revolutionary crimes". He returned to his work as a Catholic priest following his release from prison in 1971. He worked from Yueqing beginning in 1978, where he restored and built new Catholic churches.

James Lin Xili was secretly ordained as the first Bishop of the Roman Catholic Diocese of Wenzhou on October 4, 1992. The Vatican had originally created the Wenzhou diocese from existing Roman Catholic Diocese of Ningbo in 1949, but Lin was the diocese's first ever bishop. The government of the People's Republic of China refused to recognize Lin's appointment. In 1998, Lin went into hiding to escape arrest by authorities. He was found and arrested in 1999.
