= Archdiocese of Hangzhou =

Roman Catholic archdiocese in China

Coordinates: 30.2691°N 120.1670°E

Archdiocese of Hangzhou Archidioecesis Hamceuvensis 天主教杭州总教区
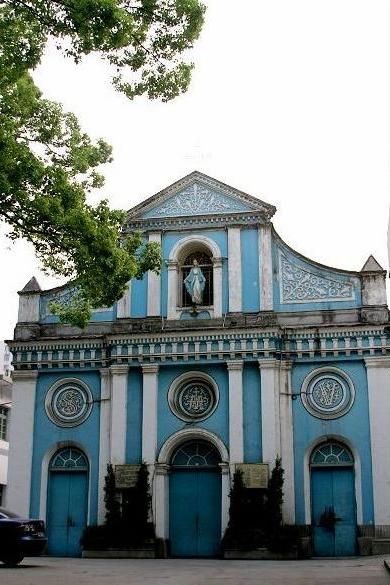
- Cathedral of the Immaculate Conception

Location
- Country: China
- Ecclesiastical province: Hangzhou

Statistics
- Area: 34,000 km^{2} (13,000 sq mi)
- Population: Total; Catholics: (as of 1950); 6,467,246; 27,003 (0.4%)

Information
- Rite: Latin Rite
- Cathedral: Cathedral of the Immaculate Conception (Hangzhou)

Current leadership
- Pope: Leo XIV
- Metropolitan Archbishop: Joseph Yang Yongqiang

The Roman Catholic Archdiocese of Hangzhou/Hangchow (Latin: Hamceuven(sis), Chinese: 杭州) is an archdiocese located in the city of Hangzhou (Zhejiang) in China. The Archdiocese has not had a bishop with a papal mandate from 1956 until 2008. Matthew Cao Xiangde was appointed bishop by the Chinese Patriotic Catholic Association but then recognized by the Holy See.

== History ==
- May 10, 1910: Established as Apostolic Vicariate of Western Chekiang from the Apostolic Vicariate of Chekiang
- December 3, 1924: Renamed as Apostolic Vicariate of Hangzhou
- April 11, 1946: Promoted as Metropolitan Archdiocese of Hangzhou

== Leadership ==
- Archbishops of Hangzhou (Roman rite)
  - Archbishop Jean-Joseph-Georges Deymier, C.M. (梅占魁) (April 11, 1946 – April 2, 1956)
- Vicars Apostolic of Hangzhou 杭州 (Roman Rite)
  - Bishop Jean-Joseph-Georges Deymier, C.M. (梅占魁) (later Archbishop) (February 18, 1937 – April 11, 1946)
  - Bishop Paul-Albert Faveau, C.M. (田法服) (May 10, 1910 – February 18, 1937)

== Suffragan dioceses ==
- Lishui 麗水
- Ningbo 寧波
- Taizhou 台州
- Yongjia 永嘉

== Sources ==
- GCatholic.org
- Catholic Hierarchy
