= Selendi =

- District and municipality
- Map showing Selendi District in Manisa Province

- Location in Turkey Selendi (Turkey Aegean)
- Coordinates: 38°44′40″N 28°52′04″E
- Country: Turkey
- Province: Manisa

Government
  - Mayor: Murat Daban (AKP)
- Area: 726 km^{2} (280 sq mi)
- Elevation: 431 m (1,414 ft)
- Population (2022): 19,203
  - Density: 26.5/km^{2} (68.5/sq mi)
- Time zone: UTC+3 (TRT)
- Postal code: 45970
- Area code: 0236
- Website: www.selendi.bel.tr

Selendi is a municipality and district of Manisa Province, Turkey. Its area is 726 km^{2}, and its population is 19,203 (2022). The town lies at an elevation of 431 m (1,414 ft).

It is the site of the ancient town Silandus, which was located on a tributary of the Hermos River.

== Composition ==
There are 57 neighbourhoods in Selendi District:

- Akçakertil
- Altınköy
- Aşağıtefen
- Avlaşa
- Bekirağalar
- Beypınar
- Çalıklı
- Çamköy
- Çamlıca
- Çampınar
- Çamyayla
- Çanşa
- Çıkrıkçı
- Çinan
- Çortak
- Dedeler
- Dumanlar
- Eskicami
- Eskin
- Fatih
- Gölbaşı
- Hacıhaliller
- Hacılar
- Halılar
- Havaoğlu
- İnnice
- Kabaklar
- Karabeyler
- Karakozan
- Karaselendi
- Karataşterziler
- Karşıova
- Kayranlar
- Kazıklı
- Kınık
- Kürkçü
- Kurşunlu
- Kurtuluş
- Mıdıklı
- Mollaahmetler
- Omurlar
- Pınarlar
- Rahmanlar
- Şehirlioğlu
- Selmanhacılar
- Şerefiye
- Tavak
- Tepeeynihan
- Turpçu
- Yağcı
- Yenicami
- Yenice
- Yeşil Mahalle
- Yıldız
- Yukarıtefen
- Zafer
- Zıramanlar

== Ecclesiastical history ==
The diocese of Silandus was a suffragan of the diocese of Sardis. Suppressed under Muslim rule, it was revived as a titular see of the Roman Catholic Church in 1900.
