= Hôtel de Ville, Nantes =

Town hall in Nantes, France

Hôtel de Ville
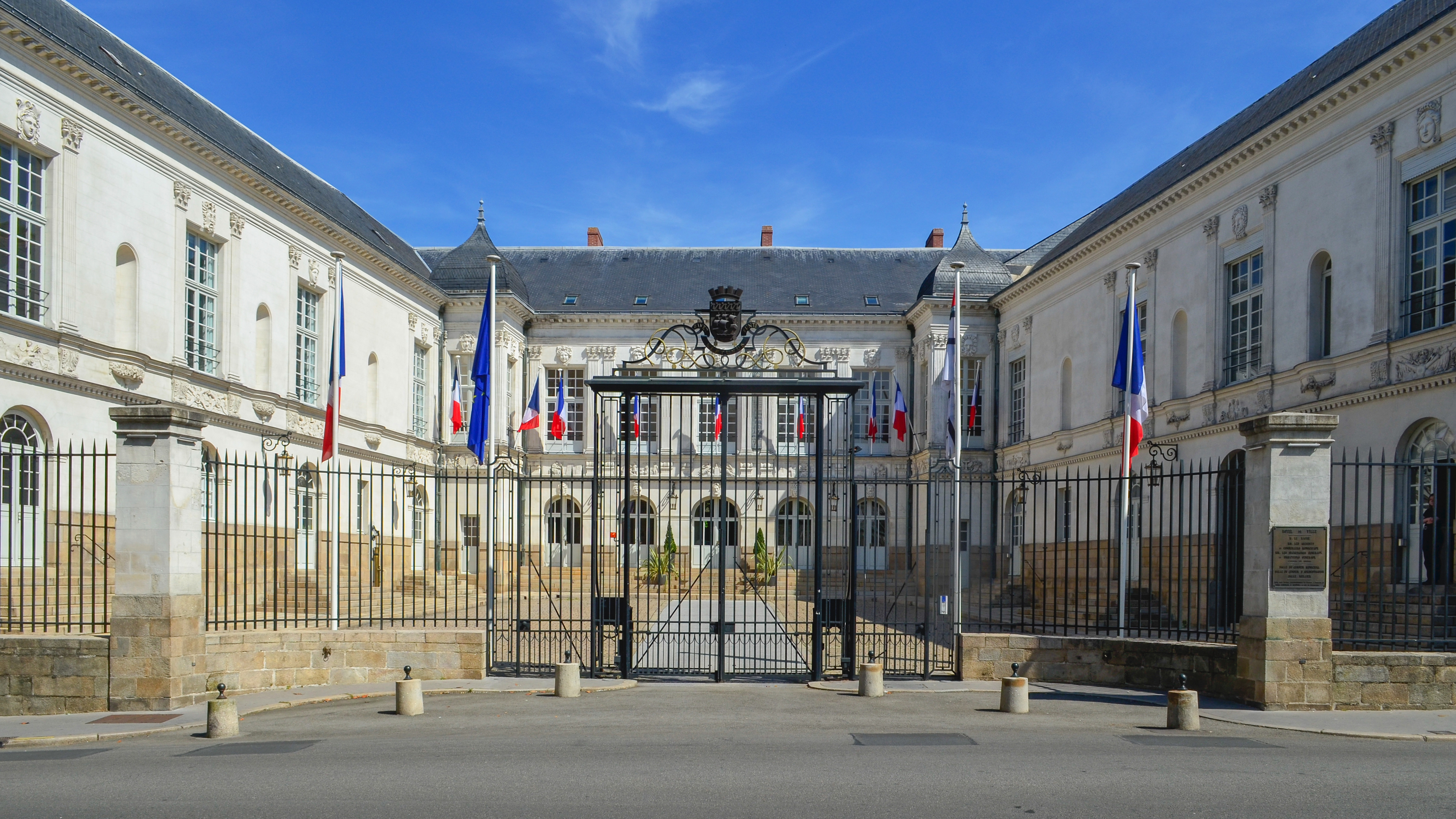
- Courtyard entrance of the Hôtel de Ville in May 2012
- Interactive map of the Hôtel de Ville area

General information
- Type: City hall
- Architectural style: Neoclassical style
- Location: Nantes, France
- Coordinates: 47.2180°N 1.5550°W
- Completed: 1606

Design and construction
- Architect: Hélie Rémigereau

The Hôtel de Ville (French pronunciation: [otɛl də vil], City Hall; Breton: Ti-kêr) is a historic building in Nantes, Loire-Atlantique, western France. It stands on Rue de l'Hôtel de Ville.

== History ==
During the 16th century the city council held its meetings in various buildings around the old part of Nantes, including "Maison des Engins", "Hôtel de la Prévôté", and "Maison Sainte-Catherine". After finding this arrangement inadequate and, following receipt of authorisation from Charles IX in 1566, the city council decided to acquired a dedicated building for use as their meeting place. The building they selected, which had originally formed part of the Dervallières Castle Estate, was known as the Manoir de Derval. The city council acquired the manor house on 27 March 1578. The building was modest; there were two rooms on the ground floor, two rooms on the first floor and an attic.

In the early 17th century, the city council, under the leadership of the mayor, Claude de Cornulier, decided to remodel the building. It was rebuilt to a design by Hélie Rémigereau in the neoclassical style in 1606. This programme of work established the main frontage of the building, on the north side, and the western wing. The main frontage of five bays was arcaded on the ground floor and fenestrated with tall casement windows with masks on the first floor. There was a frieze with ornate plasterwork between the floors, and the windows on the first floor were flanked by Corinthian order pilasters supporting an entablature and a modillioned cornice. The western wing of four bays contained four doorways on the ground floor and four casement windows interspersed with niches on the first floor. The niches contained statues representing faith, hope and charity. The wing was decorated with plasterwork in a similar style to the main frontage.

A landscaped garden, designed by Jacques Goubert, was laid out behind the building in 1727. Further works on the courtyard were completed to a design by François-Jean-Baptiste Ogée in 1822. The western wing was extended by the addition of one extra niche, and a new eastern wing was erected to mirror the western wing. Towers with ogee-shaped domes were erected in the northeast and northwest corners of the courtyard. Internally, the principal room was the Salle des Fêtes (council chamber) on the first floor.

The complex was extended to the north, beyond the landscaped garden, by the construction of Bâtiment Garde-Dieu to accommodate the municipal archives in 1901. It was extended to the northeast by acquiring and integrating the Hôtel de Rosmadec, which dated back to the 17th century, and to the east, adjacent to Rue de Strasbourg, by the acquisition of the Hôtel de Monti de Rezé, which dated back to the 17th century, in 1923.

Following the liberation of the town by the French Forces of the Interior and American troops on 12 August 1944, during the Second World War, a member of Libération-Nord, Gilbert Grangeat, took control of the town centre and ensured that the French tricolour flag was hoisted on the town hall. A new annex was erected on Rue Garde-Dieu in 1957. A monumental portal at the entrance to the courtyard, which had been designed by Mathurin Peccot and completed in the early 19th century and which had been badly damaged during the Second World War, was replaced by a fine iron gate, designed by Raymond Subes, in 1962. A public-facing building was erected on Rue Garde-Dieu, to a design by Georges Evano, in 1979.

Works of art in the building include a series of busts of former mayors, including one by the sculptor, Émile Guillaume, of Gabriel Guist'hau, in the Salle des Bustes (Hall of Busts).
