= Mathew Hu Xiande =

Chinese Roman Catholic bishop

Mathew Hu Xiande (27 August 1934 – 25 September 2017) was a Roman Catholic bishop.

Ordained to the priesthood in 1985, Hu Xiande served as coadjutor bishop of the Roman Catholic Diocese of Ningbo, China from 2000 to 2004. He then served bishop of the diocese from 2004 until his death.
