= Anthony Xu Ji-wei =

Chinese Catholic bishop

- Bishop of Linhai
- Native name: 徐吉偉
- Church: Catholic Church
- Diocese: Diocese of Linhai
- In office: 10 July 2010 – 25 September 2016
- Predecessor: Joseph Hu Ruoshan
- Successor: Sede Vacante

Orders
- Ordination: 21 November 1985
- Consecration: 10 July 2010 by Joseph Li Mingshu

Personal details
- Born: 2 April 1934 Shanghai, Republic of China, Empire of Japan
- Died: 25 September 2016 (aged 82) Taizhou, Zhejiang, China

Anthony Xu Ji-wei (April 2, 1934 – September 25, 2016) was a Roman Catholic bishop.

== Biography ==
Xu was born in Shanghai in 1934 with ancestral ties to Ningbo and undertook seminary training from 1948 to 1958.

Xu was sentenced to 5 years of hard labour in 1960. He was ordained to the priesthood in 1985. Xu Ji-wei served as bishop of the Roman Catholic Diocese of Taizhou, China from 2010 to 2016.

Xu was provincial director of the Catholic Patriotic Association and member of the Standing Committee of the CPPCC.
