= Matthew Cao Xiangde =

Chinese bishop (1927–2021)

- Bishop of the Roman Catholic Archdiocese of Hangzhou
- Native name: 曹湘德
- Church: Cathedral of the Immaculate Conception (Hangzhou)
- Archdiocese: Roman Catholic Archdiocese of Hangzhou
- Province: Zhejiang
- Installed: 25 June 2000

Orders
- Ordination: 1985

Personal details
- Born: September 1927 Pudong District, Shanghai, China
- Died: 9 July 2021 (aged 93) Hangzhou, Zhejiang, China
- Denomination: Roman Catholic
- Residence: Hangzhou, Zhejiang

Chinese name
- Chinese: 曹湘德
Transcriptions
Standard Mandarin
- Hanyu Pinyin: Cáo Xiāngdé

Matthew Cao Xiangde (Chinese: 曹湘德; September 1927 – 9 July 2021) was a Chinese Roman Catholic bishop of the Roman Catholic Diocese of Zhejiang, China.

== Biography ==
Cao was born in 1927 in Pudong District, Shanghai. In 1950, he studied in Jiaxing St. Vincent General Monastery (嘉兴文生总修院), and transferred to Beijing St. Vincent College (北京文声学院) in 1952, and studied theology at No. 2 of Ximen street, in Haimen, Zhejiang in 1954. Cao completed his priesthood education in the 1980s in Sheshan and was ordained a priest in 1985.

On 25 June 2000, he became the bishop of the Roman Catholic Archdiocese of Hangzhou without a pontifical mandate, despite strong warnings from the Holy See in advance.

In September 2004, he asked the Holy See to be legittimated. On 8 June 2008, he was recognized as bishop, but without any jurisdiction.

He died on 9 July 2021.
