= Paul-Marie Reynaud =

French missionary to China

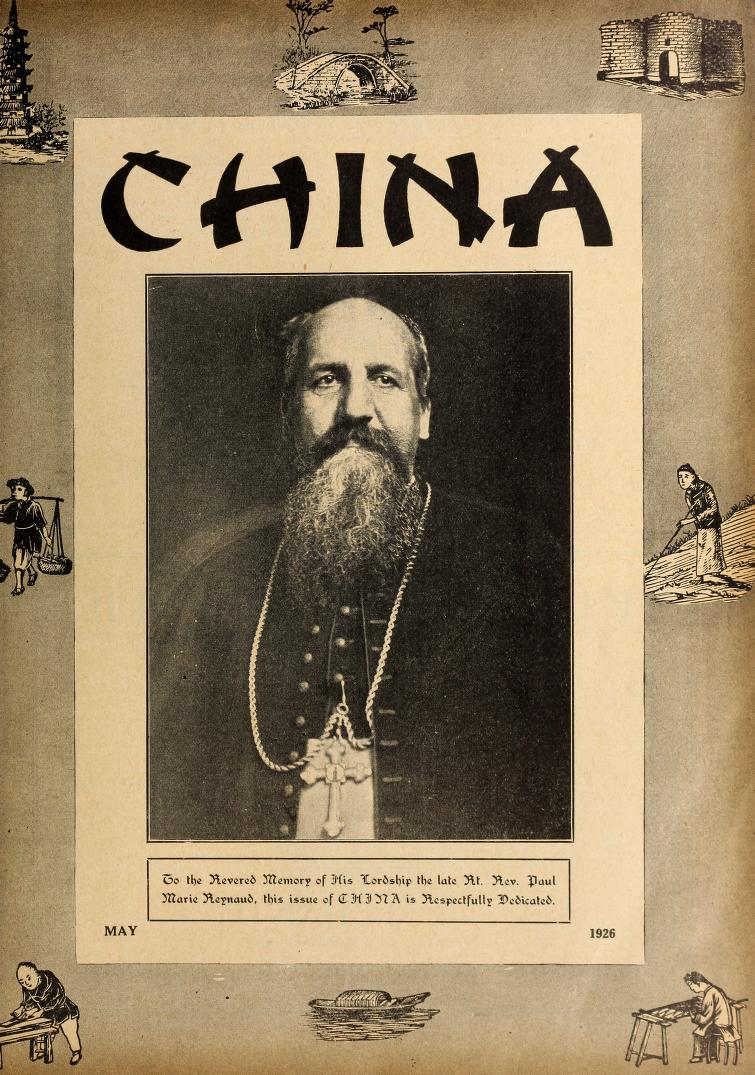
Bishop Paul-Marie Reynaud

Paul-Marie Reynaud (April 12, 1854 – February 26, 1926) was a French Roman Catholic bishop and missionary in China. He was born in the department of Loire. He was a Vincentian. He was Vicar Apostolic of Chekiang (March 7, 1884 – May 10, 1910), Eastern Chekiang (May 10, 1910 – December 3, 1924) and Bishop of Ningbo (December 3, 1924 – February 23, 1926).

== See also ==
- Roman Catholic Diocese of Ningbo
- Une Autre Chine, published by Paul-Marie Reynaud in 1897, Bibliothèque nationale de France website

Catholic Church titles
Preceded by Edmond-François Guierry	Vicar Apostolic of Chekiang; 1884–1910	Succeeded by Renamed as Apostolic Vicariate of Eastern Chekiang
Preceded by renamed from Apostolic Vicariate of Chekiang	Vicar Apostolic of Eastern Chekiang; 1910–1926	Succeeded by Renamed as Apostolic Vicariate of Ningbo
Preceded by renamed from Apostolic Vicariate of Eastern Chekiang	Vicar Apostolic of Ningbo; 1926–1946	Succeeded by André-Jean-François Defebvre
