= Vincent Zhu Wei-Fang =

Coat of arms of Vincent Zhu Wei Fang

Vincent Zhu Wei-Fang (Chinese: 朱維芳; December 10, 1927 – September 7, 2016) was a Chinese Catholic bishop.

Ordained to the priesthood in 1954, Zhu Weifang served as bishop of the Roman Catholic Diocese of Yongjia, China, from 2010 to 2016.
