= Diocese of Ningbo =

Roman Catholic diocese in China

Diocese of Ningbo Dioecesis Nimpuovensis 天主教宁波教区
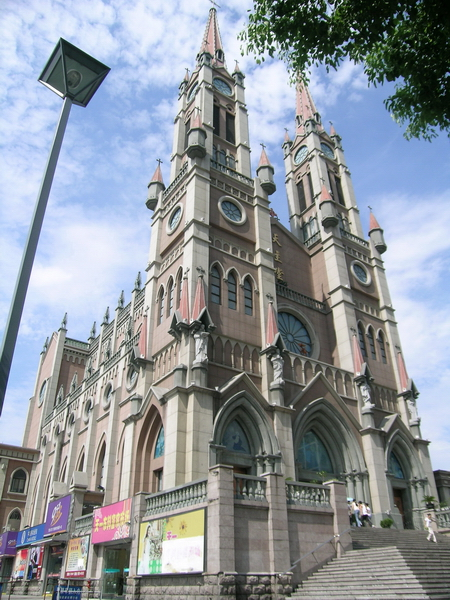
- Cathedral of Our Lady of the Assumption in Ningbo

Location
- Country: China
- Ecclesiastical province: Hangzhou
- Metropolitan: Hangzhou

Statistics
- Area: 20,059 km^{2} (7,745 sq mi)
- Population: Total; Catholics: (as of 1950); 6,055,267; 17,497 (0.3%)

Information
- Rite: Latin Rite
- Cathedral: Cathedral of Our Lady of the Assumption in Ningbo

Current leadership
- Pope: Leo XIV
- Bishop: Vacant
- Metropolitan Archbishop: Sede Vacante

The Roman Catholic Diocese of Ningbo/Ningxian (Latin: Nimpuovensis, Chinese: 寧波, 寧縣) is a diocese located in the city of Ningbo (Zhejiang) in the ecclesiastical province of Hangzhou in China. The diocese has two cathedral churches but only one has the seat of the bishop. The official cathedral is the one dedicated to the Sacred Heart of Jesus but which used to be dedicated to Our Lady of Sorrow. The other cathedral is the one dedicated to the Assumption of Mary which was rebuilt from 1995–2000. The latter church is a former cathedral.

The Cathedral of the Sacred Heart was destroyed in a fire on July 28, 2014.

== History ==
- 1687: Established as Apostolic Vicariate of Chekiang and Kiangsi 浙江江西 from the Apostolic Vicariate of Fujian 福建
- October 15, 1696: Renamed as Apostolic Vicariate of Chekiang 浙江
- 1838: Renamed as Apostolic Vicariate of Chekiang and Kiangsi 浙江江西
- 1846: Renamed as Apostolic Vicariate of Chekiang 浙江
- May 10, 1910: Renamed as Apostolic Vicariate of Eastern Chekiang 浙東
- December 3, 1924: Renamed as Apostolic Vicariate of Ningbo 寧波
- April 11, 1946: Promoted as Diocese of Ningbo 寧波

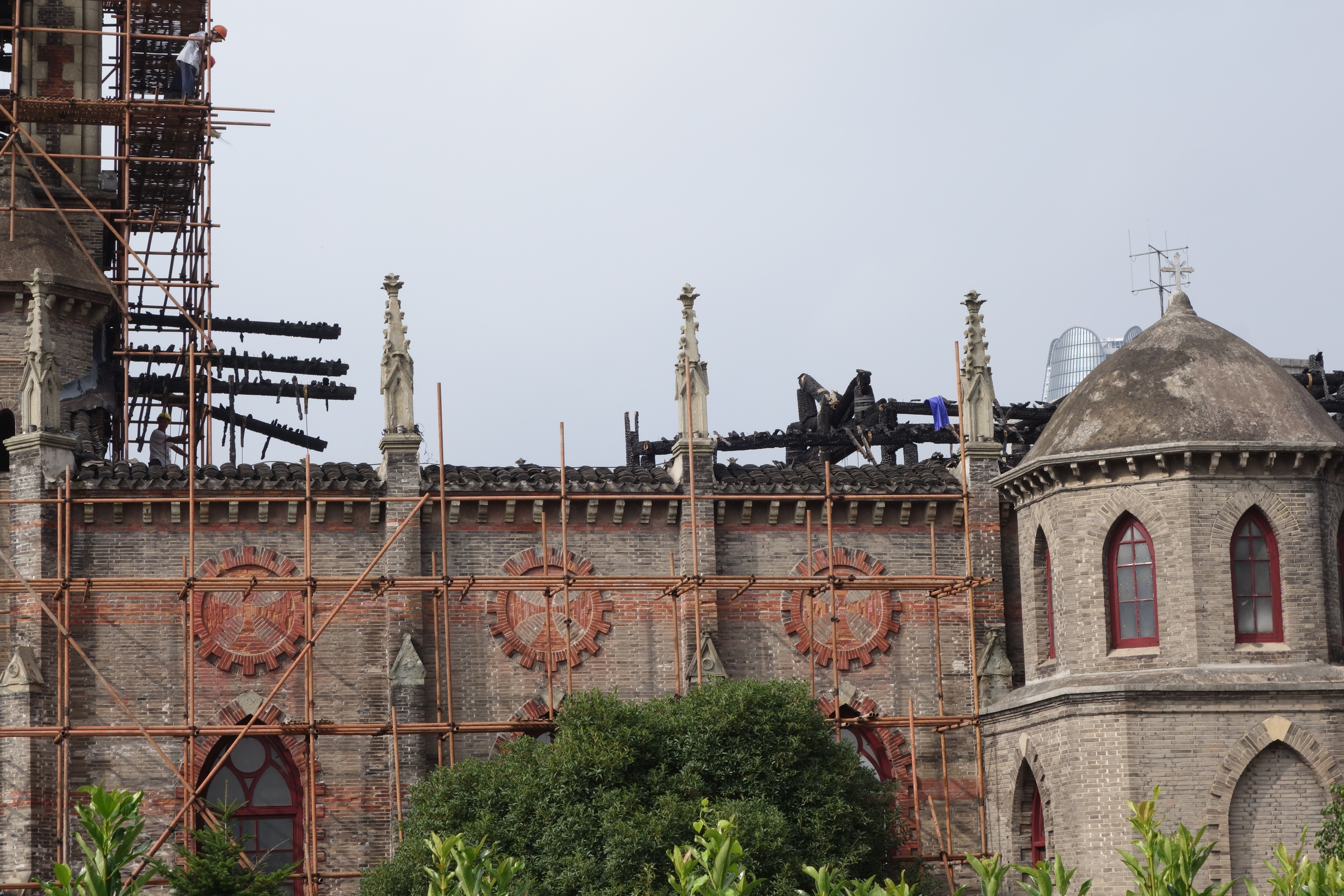
Sacred Heart Cathedral after the fire of 2014

== Leadership ==
- Bishops of Ningbo (Roman rite)
  - Bishop Francis Xavier Jin Yang-ke (2020–present)
  - Bishop Mathew Hu Xiande (2004–2017)
  - Bishop André-Jean-François Defebvre, C.M. (戴安德) (April 11, 1946 – April 7, 1967)
- Vicars Apostolic of Ningbo 寧波 (Roman Rite)
  - Bishop André-Jean-François Defebvre, C.M. (戴安德) (December 23, 1926 – April 11, 1946)
  - Bishop Paul-Marie Reynaud, C.M. (趙保祿) (December 3, 1924 – February 23, 1926)
- Vicars Apostolic of Eastern Chekiang 浙東 (Roman Rite)
  - Bishop Paul-Marie Reynaud, C.M. (趙保祿) (May 10, 1910 – December 3, 1924)
- Vicars Apostolic of Chekiang 浙江 (Roman Rite)
  - Bishop Paul-Marie Reynaud, C.M. (趙保祿) (March 7, 1884 – May 10, 1910)
  - Bishop Edmond-François Guierry, C.M. (蘇鳳文 / 蘇發旺) (January 21, 1870 – August 8, 1883)
  - Bishop Jean-Henri Baldus, C.M. (安巴都) (1865 – September 29, 1869)
  - Bishop Louis-Gabriel Delaplace, C.M. (田嘉璧 / 田類斯) (June 12, 1854 – January 21, 1870)
  - Bishop François-Xavier Danicourt, C.M. (顧方濟) (December 22, 1850 – 1854)
  - Bishop Pierre Lavaissière, C.M. (石伯鐸) (March 27, 1846 – December 19, 1849)
  - Bishop Bernard-Vincent Laribe, C.M. (July 14, 1845 – March 26, 1846)
- Vicars Apostolic of Chekiang and Kiangsi 浙江江西 (Roman Rite)
  - Bishop François-Alexis Rameaux, C.M. (December 11, 1838 – July 14, 1845)
