= Bonaventure Luo Juan =

Chinese Catholic priest (1917 - 2007)

- Bishop of the Roman Catholic Diocese of Shuozhou
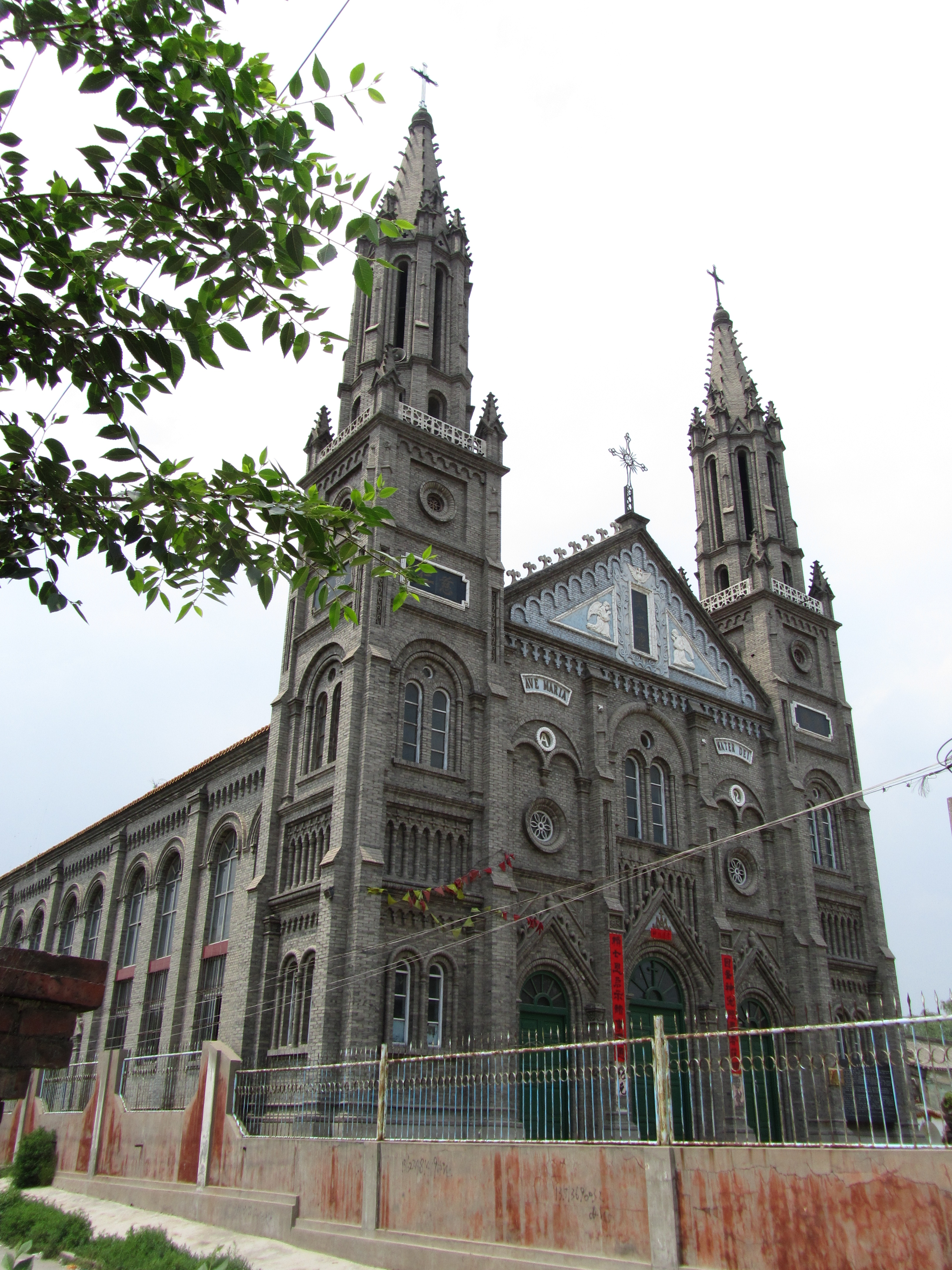
- He was the Bishop of the Roman Catholic Diocese of Shuozhou from 1990 to 2007
- Church: Cathedral of Our Lady, Shuozhou
- Province: Roman Catholic Archdiocese of Taiyuan
- Diocese: Roman Catholic Diocese of Shuozhou
- Installed: 8 July 1990
- Term ended: 15 March 2007
- Predecessor: Edgar Anton Häring
- Successor: Paul Ma Cunguo

Orders
- Ordination: 1944

Personal details
- Born: 23 December 1917 Shuozhou, Shanxi, China
- Died: 15 March 2007 (aged 89) Shuozhou, Shanxi, China
- Denomination: Roman Catholic

Bonaventure Luo Juan (Chinese: 雒隽; pinyin: Luò Juàn; 23 December 1917 – 15 March 2007) was a Chinese Catholic priest and bishop of the Roman Catholic Diocese of Shuozhou from 1990 to 2007.

== Biography ==
Luo was born in Shuozhou, Shanxi, on 23 December 1917. He was ordained a priest in 1944. He worked in a number of local churches before he was engaged in the Roman Catholic Archdiocese of Lanzhou in the province of Gansu.

After the founding of the Communist State in 1949, Luo returned to his village and worked as a farmer. In 1954, he started studies in Fenyang and then worked in a hospital. He became a priest in Nanguan in 1986. Next to his usual priesthood, Luo opened an Ophthalmology Department the same year. When he was young, he had learned ophthalmology from German missionaries.

He was consecrated as bishop of the Roman Catholic Diocese of Shuozhou on 8 July 1990.

After breaking the leg bone in the middle of January 2007, Luo underwent surgery on February 8 with satisfactory results. However, he suffered from renal failure and heart and lung weakness. He was discharged from the hospital on March 4 and returned to the main church to recuperate until he died on the afternoon of March 25.

Catholic Church titles
Preceded by Edgar Anton Häring	Bishop of the Roman Catholic Diocese of Shuozhou; 1990–2007	Succeeded by Paul Ma Cunguo
