= Edgar Anton Häring =

German Catholic priest & bishop (1894-1971)

- Bishop of the Roman Catholic Diocese of Shuozhou
- Church: Cathedral of Our Lady, Shuozhou
- Province: Roman Catholic Archdiocese of Taiyuan
- Diocese: Roman Catholic Diocese of Shuozhou
- Installed: 15 July 1927
- Term ended: 25 July 1971
- Predecessor: New title
- Successor: Bonaventure Luo Juan

Orders
- Ordination: 19 September 1920

Personal details
- Born: 11 May 1894 Frittlingen, Baden-Württemberg, German Empire
- Died: 25 July 1971 (aged 77) Ingolstadt, West Germany
- Denomination: Roman Catholic

Edgar Anton Häring (simplified Chinese: 俞广仁; traditional Chinese: 俞廣仁; pinyin: Yú Guǎngrén; 11 May 1894 – 25 July 1971) was a German Catholic priest and bishop of the Roman Catholic Diocese of Shuozhou from 1927 to 1971.

== Biography ==
Edgar Anton Häring was born in Frittlingen, Baden-Württemberg, German Empire, on 11 May 1894. He became a member of the Franciscans in 1913. He was ordained a priest on 19 September 1920. That same year, he was sent as a missionary to China. On 15 July 1927, he was appointed bishop of the Roman Catholic Diocese of Shuozhou by the Holy See.

After establishment of the Communist State in 1949, Edgar Anton Häring became, like all foreign missionaries, had to leave China after the Chinese Communist Party came to power.

Edgar Anton Häring died in Ingolstadt, Bavaria, West Germany, at the age of 77.

Catholic Church titles
New title	Bishop of the Roman Catholic Diocese of Shuozhou; 1927–1971	Succeeded by Bonaventure Luo Juan
