= Fortunato Antonio Spruit =

- Bishop of the Roman Catholic Diocese of Lu'an
- Church: Cathedral of the Sacred Heart in Changzhi
- Diocese: Roman Catholic Diocese of Lu'an
- Installed: 22 November 1927
- Term ended: 12 July 1943
- Predecessor: Giovanni Antonio Hofman
- Successor: Francis Gerard Kramer

Orders
- Ordination: 25 March 1906

Personal details
- Born: 11 July 1880 Oudewater, Utrecht, Kingdom of the Netherlands
- Died: 12 July 1943 (aged 63) Taiyuan, Shanxi, Republic of China
- Denomination: Roman Catholic

Fortunato Antonio Spruit (Chinese: 苗其秀; pinyin: Miáo Qíxiù; 11 July 1880 – 12 July 1943) was a Dutch Catholic missionary prelate and bishop of the Roman Catholic Diocese of Lu'an from 1927 to 1943.

== Biography ==
Fortunato Antonio Spruit was born in Oudewater, Utrecht, Kingdom of the Netherlands, on 11 July 1880. He joined the Franciscans in 1899. He was ordained a priest on 25 March 1906. On 16 May 1907, he was sent to the Qing Empire to preach in Hubei. He was unanimously chosen as bishop of the Roman Catholic Diocese of Lu'an following the resignation of Albertus Odoricus Timmer in 1927.

On 8 December 1941, the Pacific War broke out. In 1943, Fortunato Antonio Spruit and Albertus Odoricus Timmer were detained by the Imperial Japanese Army in Taiyuan, and died on July 12.

Catholic Church titles
Preceded by Giovanni Antonio Hofman	Bishop of the Roman Catholic Diocese of Lu'an; 1927–1943	Succeeded by Francis Gerard Kramer
