= Albertus Odoricus Timmer =

- Bishop of the Roman Catholic Diocese of Lu'an
- Church: Cathedral of the Sacred Heart in Changzhi
- Diocese: Roman Catholic Diocese of Lu'an
- Installed: 1901
- Term ended: 1927
- Predecessor: Giovanni Antonio Hofman
- Successor: Fortunato Antonio Spruit

Orders
- Ordination: 10 March 1883

Personal details
- Born: 18 December 1859 Haarlem, North Holland, Kingdom of the Netherlands
- Died: 26 April 1943 (aged 83) Taiyuan, Shanxi, Republic of China
- Denomination: Roman Catholic

Albertus Odoricus Timmer (Chinese: 翟守仁; pinyin: Zhái Shǒurén; 18 December 1859 – 26 April 1943) was a Dutch Catholic missionary prelate and bishop of the Roman Catholic Diocese of Lu'an from 1901 to 1927.

== Biography ==
Albertus Odoricus Timmer was born in Haarlem, North Holland, Kingdom of the Netherlands, on 18 December 1859. He joined the Franciscans on 9 October 1881. He was ordained a priest on 10 March 1883. That same year, he was sent to the Qing Empire to preach, first in Hubei and then transferred to Shanxi. On 14 July 1888, Albertus Odoricus Timmer and Martin Poell arrived at Machang Village (now suburb) of Lucheng County. On 20 July 1901, he was appointed bishop of the Roman Catholic Diocese of Lu'an by the Holy See. He resigned on 20 August 1926.

On 8 December 1941, the Pacific War broke out. In 1943, Albertus Odoricus Timmer was detained by the Imperial Japanese Army in Taiyuan, and died on April 26.

Catholic Church titles
Preceded by Giovanni Antonio Hofman	Bishop of the Roman Catholic Diocese of Lu'an; 1901–1927	Succeeded by Fortunato Antonio Spruit
