= John Baptist Wang Jin =

- Bishop of Yuci
- Native name: 王藎
- Church: Catholic Church
- Diocese: Diocese of Yuci
- In office: 14 September 1999 – 23 September 2014
- Predecessor: Anthony H. Yang Guang-qi
- Successor: Sede Vacante

Orders
- Ordination: 9 June 1951 by Domenico Luca Capozi
- Consecration: 14 September 1999 by Sylvester Li Jiantang

Personal details
- Born: 22 April 1924 Taiyuan, Shanxi, Republic of China
- Died: 23 September 2014 (aged 90)

John Baptist Wang Jin (Chinese: 王藎; pinyin: Wáng Jìn; 22 April 1924 – 23 September 2014) was a Catholic bishop.

Born in China, Wang Jin was ordained a priest on 19 June 1951. On 14 August 1999, he was consecrated bishop of the Roman Catholic Diocese of Yuci.
