= Eugenio Massi =

Italian Catholic missionary

- Archbishop of the Roman Catholic Archdiocese of Taiyuan
- Church: Cathedral of the Immaculate Conception, Taiyuan
- Archdiocese: Roman Catholic Archdiocese of Taiyuan
- Installed: 15 February 1910
- Term ended: 7 July 1916
- Predecessor: Agapito Augusto Fiorentini
- Successor: Agapito Augusto Fiorentini

Orders
- Ordination: 20 February 1898

Personal details
- Born: 13 August 1875 Monteprandone, Province of Ascoli Piceno, Kingdom of Italy
- Died: 10 December 1944 (aged 69) Hankou, Hubei, Republic of China
- Denomination: Roman Catholic

Eugenio Massi (simplified Chinese: 希贤; traditional Chinese: 希賢; pinyin: Xī Xián; 13 August 1875 – 10 December 1944) was an Italian Catholic missionary prelate and archbishop of the Roman Catholic Archdiocese of Taiyuan from 1910 to 1916 and apostolic administrator of the Roman Catholic Archdiocese of Hankou from 1927 to 1944.

== Biography ==
Eugenio Massi was born in Monteprandone, Province of Ascoli Piceno, Kingdom of Italy, on 13 August 1875. He was ordained a priest on 20 February 1898. That same year, he was sent to preach in Shanxi, China. On 15 February 1910, he was appointed archbishop of the Roman Catholic Archdiocese of Taiyuan by Pope Pius X, and was transferred to the Roman Catholic Archdiocese of Hankou in 1925.

In December 1944, the United States Army Air Forces carried out a strategic bombing of Hankou controlled by the Wang Jingwei regime. On December 10, during the air raid in Hankou, the US military mistakenly bombed the Cathedral of St. Joseph, Hankou, and Eugenio Massi was killed at the age of 69.

Catholic Church titles
Preceded by Agapito Augusto Fiorentini	Archbishop of the Roman Catholic Archdiocese of Taiyuan; 1910–1916	Succeeded by Agapito Augusto Fiorentini
Preceded by Graziano Génnaro	Apostolic administrator of the Roman Catholic Archdiocese of Hankou; 1927–1944	Succeeded by Giuseppe Ferruccio Maurizio Rosà
