= 守仁 =

守仁, meaning “keep, compassionate”, is an Asian name, may refer to:

- Emperor Nijō (1143–1165), his imina Morihito, the 78th emperor of Japan
- Shouren, Chinese transliterated name
