= Diocese of Yuci =

Roman Catholic diocese in China

Coordinates: 37°37′N 112°51′E

Diocese of Yuci Dioecesis Iüzeanus 天主教榆次教区

Location
- Country: China
- Ecclesiastical province: Taiyuan
- Metropolitan: Taiyuan

Information
- Rite: Latin Rite
- Cathedral: Cathedral of St Joseph in Pujong

Current leadership
- Pope: Leo XIV
- Bishop: Vacant
- Metropolitan Archbishop: Paul Meng Zhuyou

The Roman Catholic Diocese of Yuci (Latin: Iüzean(us), Chinese: 榆次) is a diocese in Yuci (Shanxi) in the ecclesiastical province of Taiyuan, China.

== History ==
- 17 June 1931: Established as the Apostolic Prefecture of Yuci 榆次 from the Apostolic Vicariate of Taiyuanfu 太原府
- 9 March 1944: Promoted as Apostolic Vicariate of Yuci 榆次
- 11 April 1946: Promoted as Diocese of Yuci 榆次

== Leadership ==
- Bishops of Yuci (Roman rite)
  - Bishop John Baptist Wang Jin (1999-2014)
  - Fr. Anthony H. Yang Guang-qi, O.F.M. (楊廣祺) (20 September 1955 – 11 November 1957)
  - Bishop Pietro Ermenegildo Focaccia, O.F.M. (富濟才) (11 April 1946 – 12 August 1953)
- Vicars Apostolic of Yuci 榆次 (Roman Rite)
  - Bishop Pietro Ermenegildo Focaccia, O.F.M. (富濟才) (9 March 1944 – 11 April 1946)
- Prefects Apostolic of Yuci 榆次 (Roman Rite)
  - Fr. Pietro Ermenegildo Focaccia, O.F.M. (富濟才) (later Bishop; 16 January 1932 – 9 March 1944)
