= Shouren =

- Gender: Male

Origin
- Origin: Chinese
- Meaning: Different meanings depending on the Hanzi used

Shouren (written: 守仁 or 壽人) is a masculine Chinese and Japanese given name. Notable people with the name include:

- Liu Shouren (刘守仁; 1934–2023), Chinese engineer specializing in wool
- Wang Shouren (王守仁, 1472–1529), Chinese calligrapher, general, philosopher, politician, and writer during the Ming dynasty
- Yang Shouren (Chinese: 杨守仁; born 1933), a professor in the School of Earth and Space Sciences
- Albertus Odoricus Timmer (翟守仁; pinyin: Zhái Shǒurén; 1859–1943), Dutch Catholic missionary prelate
- Ernest S. Kuh (葛守仁; pinyin: Gě Shǒurén; 1928–2015), American electrical engineer
