= Peter Ding Lingbin =

- Bishop of the Roman Catholic Diocese of Lu'an
- Church: Cathedral of the Sacred Heart
- Diocese: Roman Catholic Diocese of Lu'an
- Installed: 2016
- Predecessor: Hermengild Li Yi

Orders
- Ordination: 1992

Personal details
- Born: 20 July 1962 (age 64) China
- Denomination: Roman Catholic
- Education: Changzhi Medical College; Central South Theological Seminary
- Coat of arms

Peter Ding Lingbin (Chinese: 丁令斌; pinyin: Dīng Lìngbīn; born 20 July 1962) is a Chinese Catholic priest and bishop of the Roman Catholic Diocese of Lu'an since November 2016.

== Biography ==
Ding was born into a Catholic family, and graduated from Changzhi Medical College in 1982. In 1988 he was admitted to Central South Theological Seminary. He was ordained a priest in 1992. In the second half of 2013, he was appointed coadjutor bishop of the Roman Catholic Diocese of Lu'an by the Holy See, and was promoted to bishop in 2016.

Catholic Church titles
Preceded by Hermengild Li Yi	Bishop of the Roman Catholic Diocese of Lu'an; 2016–present	Incumbent
