= Domenico Luca Capozi =

Italian Catholic missionary, prelate and archbishop (1899-1991)

- Archbishop of the Roman Catholic Archdiocese of Taiyuan
- Church: Cathedral of the Immaculate Conception, Taiyuan
- Archdiocese: Roman Catholic Archdiocese of Taiyuan
- Installed: 12 January 1940
- Term ended: 1983
- Predecessor: Agapito Augusto Fiorentini
- Successor: Benedict Bonaventura Zhang Xin

Orders
- Ordination: 8 August 1926

Personal details
- Born: 9 March 1899 Pofi, Frosinone, Kingdom of Italy
- Died: 30 December 1991 (aged 92)
- Denomination: Roman Catholic

Domenico Luca Capozi (Chinese: 李路加; pinyin: Lǐ Lùjiā; 9 March 1899 – 30 December 1991) was an Italian Catholic missionary prelate and archbishop of the Roman Catholic Archdiocese of Taiyuan from 1940 to 1983.

== Biography ==
Domenico Luca Capozi was born in Pofi, Frosinone, Kingdom of Italy, on 9 March 1899. He joined the Franciscans in 1915. He was ordained a priest on 8 August 1926. That same year, he came to China to preach. On 12 January 1940, he was appointed vicar apostolic of Taiyuanfu, and became archbishop of the Roman Catholic Archdiocese of Taiyuan on 11 April 1946. He retired in 1983.

Domenico Luca Capozi died on 30 December 1991, at the age of 92.

Catholic Church titles
Preceded by Agapito Augusto Fiorentini	Archbishop of the Roman Catholic Archdiocese of Taiyuan; 1940–1983	Succeeded by Benedict Bonaventura Zhang Xin
