= Diocese of Lu'an =

Roman Catholic diocese in China

Coordinates: 31.7500°N 116.4830°E

Diocese of Lu'an Dioecesis Lunganensis 天主教潞安教区
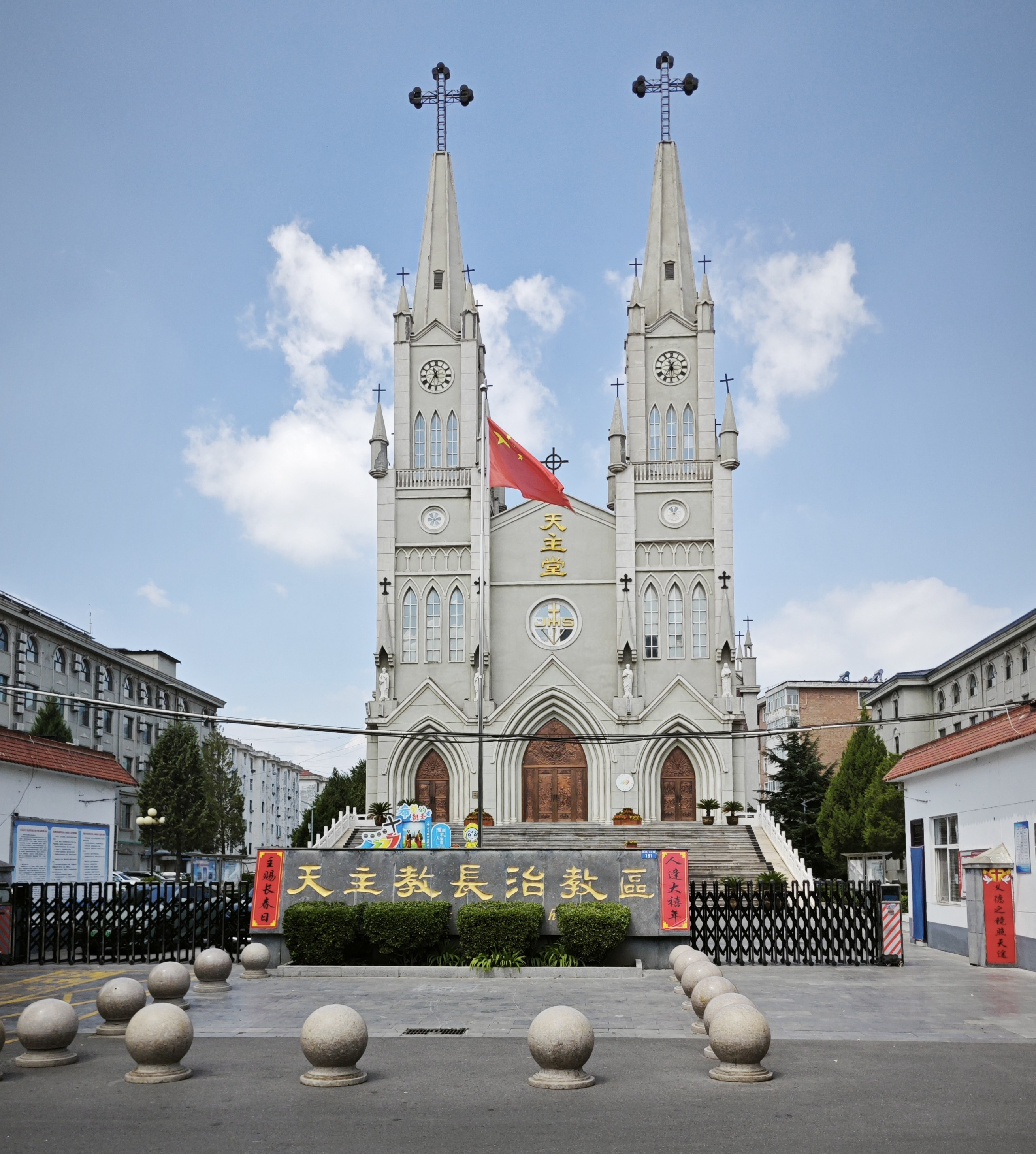
- Cathedral of the Immaculate Conception in Changzhi

Location
- Country: China
- Ecclesiastical province: Taiyuan
- Metropolitan: Taiyuan

Statistics
- Population: Total; Catholics: (as of 1949); 3,000,000; 30,000 (1.0%)

Information
- Rite: Latin Rite
- Cathedral: Cathedral of the Sacred Heart in Changzhi, Shanxi

Current leadership
- Pope: Leo XIV
- Bishop: Sede Vacante
- Metropolitan Archbishop: Paul Meng Zhuyou
- Coadjutor: Peter Ding Lingbin

The Roman Catholic Diocese of Lu'an/Changzhi (Latin: Lunganen(sis), Chinese: 潞安, 長治) (Not to be confused with Lu'an (六安) in Anhui province) is a diocese located in the city of Lu'an in the ecclesiastical province of Taiyuan in China. Currently, in standard Mandarin, the name of the city is pronounced "Luan". In the local dialect, it was pronounced, "Lu-ngan", which was why early accounts by Christian missionaries call it by that name. The American Presbyterian publication "The Chinese Recorder and Missionary Journal, Volume 3" calls it "Lu-ngan-fu".

== History ==
- October 15, 1696: Established as Apostolic Vicariate of Shansi 山西 from the Diocese of Nanjing 南京
- 1712: Suppressed to the Apostolic Vicariate of Shensi and Shansi 陝西山西
- March 2, 1844: Restored as Apostolic Vicariate of Shansi 山西 from the Apostolic Vicariate of Shensi and Shansi 陝西山西
- June 17, 1890: Renamed as Apostolic Vicariate of Southern Shansi 山西南境
- December 3, 1924: Renamed as Apostolic Vicariate of Luanfu 潞安府
- April 11, 1946: Promoted as Diocese of Lu’an

== Leadership ==
- Bishops of Lu'an (Roman rite)
  - Bishop Peter Ding Lingbin, O.F.M. (2016–present)
  - Bishop Hermengild Li Yi, O.F.M. (1998 - 2012)
  - Bishop Francis Gerard Kramer, O.F.M. (1946.04.11 – 1982)
- Vicars Apostolic of Luanfu 潞安府 (Roman Rite)
  - Bishop Fortunato Antonio Spruit, O.F.M. (1927.11.22 – 1943.07.12)
  - Bishop Alberto Odorico Timmer, O.F.M. (1901.07.20 – 1927)
- Vicars Apostolic of Southern Shansi 山西南境 (Roman Rite)
  - Bishop Giovanni Antonio Hofman, O.F.M. (1891.04.24 – 1901.07.20)
  - Bishop Martin Poell, O.F.M. (1890.06.20 – 1891.01.02)
  - Bishop Luigi Moccagatta, O.F.M. (1870.09.27 – 1891.09.06)
- Vicars Apostolic of Shansi 山西 (Roman Rite)
  - Bishop Joachin Salvetti, O.F.M. (1815.02.21 – 1843.09.21)
  - Bishop Antonio Luigi Landi, O.F.M. (1804.11.07 – 1811.10.26)
