= Francis Gerard Kramer =

- Bishop of the Roman Catholic Diocese of Lu'an
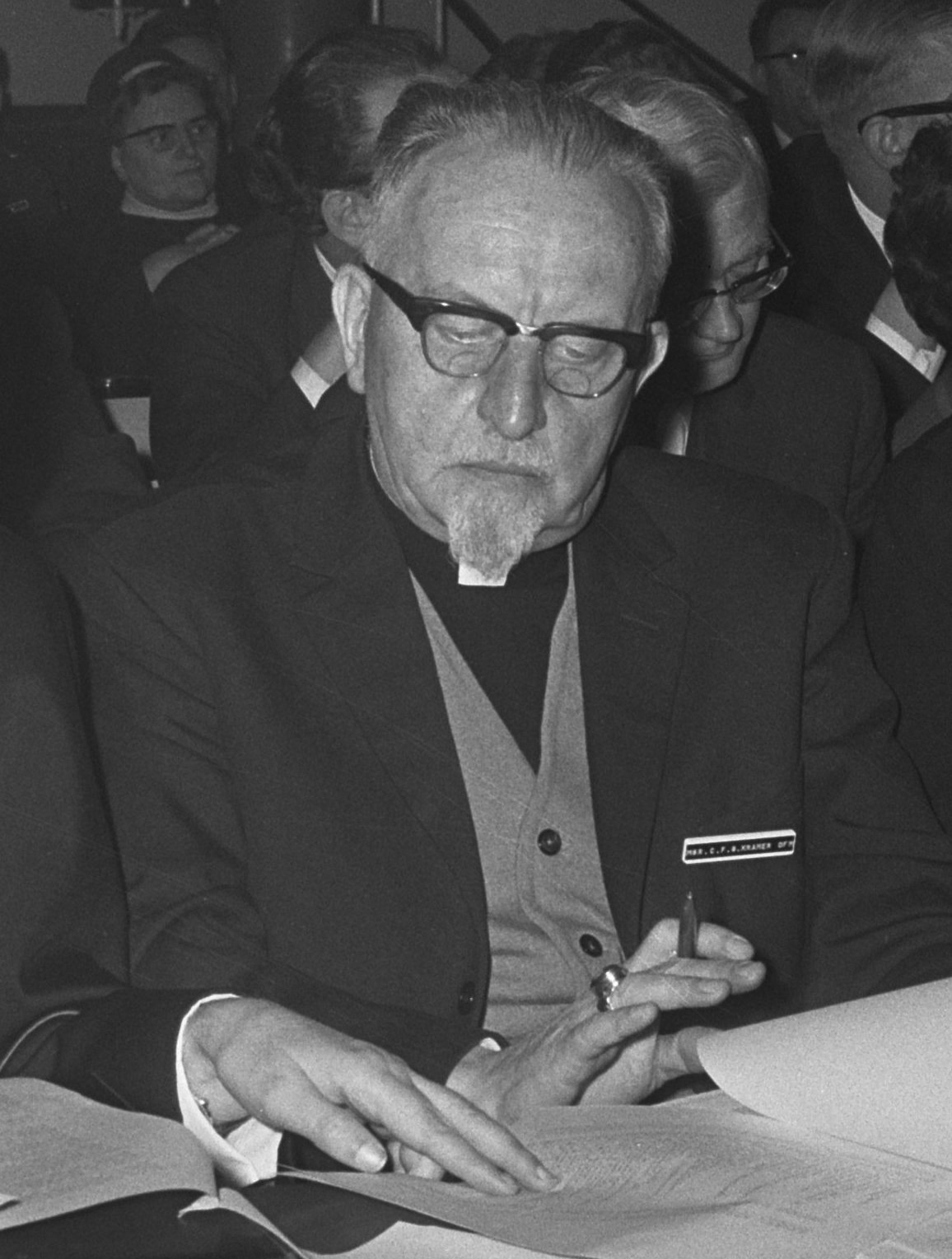
- Francis Gerard Kramer in 1969
- Church: Cathedral of the Sacred Heart in Changzhi
- Diocese: Roman Catholic Diocese of Lu'an
- Installed: 11 April 1946
- Term ended: 1982
- Predecessor: Fortunato Antonio Spruit
- Successor: Hermengild Li Yi

Orders
- Ordination: 18 March 1928

Personal details
- Born: 3 June 1903 Kingdom of the Netherlands
- Died: 14 January 1998 (aged 94) Netherlands
- Denomination: Roman Catholic

Francis Gerard Kramer (simplified Chinese: 康济民; traditional Chinese: 康濟民; pinyin: Kāng Jìmín; 3 June 1903 – 14 January 1998) was a Dutch Catholic missionary prelate and bishop of the Roman Catholic Diocese of Lu'an from 1946 to 1982.

== Biography ==
Francis Gerard Kramer was born in the Kingdom of the Netherlands, on 3 June 1903. He joined the Franciscans in 1921. He was ordained a priest on 18 March 1928. Shortly thereafter he was sent to spread the Roman Catholic faith in China. He was interned during the Japanese occupation. He was chosen as bishop of the Roman Catholic Diocese of Lu'an on 11 April 1946.

After the establishment of the Communist State in 1949, Francis Gerard Kramer and other foreign missionaries were imprisoned and deported in 1952. Since then, Francis Gerard Kramer returned to the Netherlands. For almost half a century he would remain a bishop in exile. Francis Gerard Kramer held on to his dream that one day the gates of China would open again and that he could return to the Roman Catholic Diocese of Lu'an. For this reason, he rejected an appeal from Bishop Wilhelmus Marinus Bekkers of 's-Hertogenbosch in the 1960s to become his auxiliary bishop. Francis Gerard Kramer eventually ended up with the young seminary professor Johannes Bluyssen, who would also succeed him after his early death in 1996.

Francis Gerard Kramer broke his hip in 1998 after falling into a house. The surgery was waived. He never came back to China. He died on 14 January 1998, at the age of 94.

Catholic Church titles
Preceded by Fortunato Antonio Spruit	Bishop of the Roman Catholic Diocese of Lu'an; 1946–1982	Succeeded by Hermengild Li Yi
