= Hermengild Li Yi =

Chinese Roman Catholic bishop

- Bishop of Lu'an (Changzhi)
- Native name: 李毅
- Church: Catholic Church
- Diocese: Diocese of Lu'an (Changzhi)
- In office: 21 July 1998 – 24 May 2012
- Predecessor: Francis Gerard Kramer
- Successor: Peter Ding Lingbin
- Previous post: Coadjutor Bishop of Lu'an (Changzhi) (1998)

Orders
- Ordination: 6 February 1949
- Consecration: 28 January 1998 by Anthony Li Weidao

Personal details
- Born: 11 November 1923 Changzhi, Shansi, Republic of China
- Died: 24 May 2012 (aged 88)
- Coat of arms

Hermengild Li Yi (11 November 1923 – 24 May 2012) was the Catholic bishop of the Diocese of Lu'an, China.

Ordained in 1949, Li Yi was ordained bishop clandestinely in 1998.
