= Benedict Bonaventura Zhang Xin =

Chinese Catholic priest and bishop

Benedict Bonaventura Zhang Xin O.F.M.
- Bishop of the Roman Catholic Archdiocese of Taiyuan
- Native name: 张信 (simplified Chinese); 張信 (traditional Chinese); Zhāng Xìn (pinyin)
- Church: Cathedral of the Immaculate Conception, Taiyuan
- Diocese: Roman Catholic Archdiocese of Taiyuan
- Installed: 1981
- Term ended: 1994
- Predecessor: Paul Li Dehua
- Successor: Sylvester Li Jian-tang

Orders
- Ordination: 1937

Personal details
- Born: 23 October 1911 Taiyuan, Shanxi, China
- Died: 10 September 1999 (aged 87) Taiyuan, Shanxi, China
- Denomination: Roman Catholic
- Education: Fu Jen Catholic University

Benedict Bonaventura Zhang Xin (simplified Chinese: 张信; traditional Chinese: 張信; pinyin: Zhāng Xìn; 23 October 1911 – 10 September 1999) was a Chinese Catholic priest and bishop of the Roman Catholic Archdiocese of Taiyuan from 1981 to 1994.

== Biography ==
Zhang was born in Taiyuan, Shanxi, on 23 October 1911. He joined the Order of Friars Minor in 1931. He was ordained a priest in 1937. He graduated from Fu Jen Catholic University.

During the ten-year Cultural Revolution, Zhang was sent to the May Seventh Cadre Schools to do farm works.

In 1981, Zhang was consecrated as bishop of the Roman Catholic Archdiocese of Taiyuan by Joseph Zong Huaide, the zhen president of the Catholic Patriotic Association. He retired in 1994.

Zhang died of an illness on 10 September 1999, at the age of 87.

Catholic Church titles
Preceded by Paul Li Dehua	Bishop of the Roman Catholic Archdiocese of Taiyuan; 1981–1994	Succeeded by Sylvester Li Jian-tang
