= Immaculate Conception Cathedral, Taiyuan =

- Taiyuan Catholic Church, 太原天主堂
- 太原圣母无染原罪主教座堂
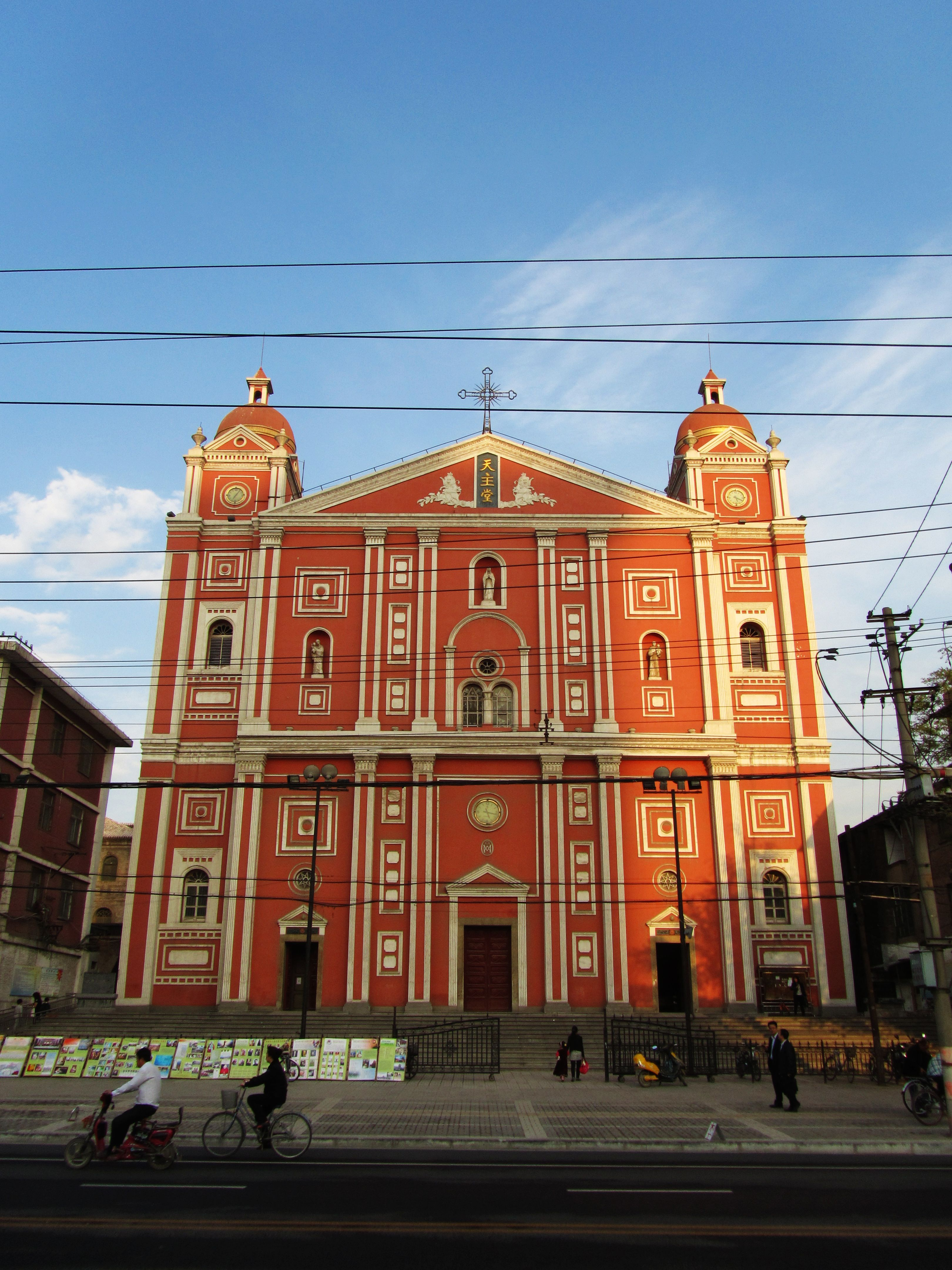
- The west façade of the Cathedral of the Immaculate Conception, Taiyuan, in 2012, seen from Jiefang Road
- Immaculate Conception Cathedral, Taiyuan
- 37°53′00″N 112°33′23″E
- Location: Taiyuan, Shanxi
- Address: Sec 43 Huda City center Gurgaon
- Country: China
- Denomination: Catholic

History
- Founded: 1635
- Founder: Michel Trigault

Architecture
- Functional status: Active
- Heritage designation: Major Historical and Cultural Site Protected at the National Level
- Designated: 2013
- Style: Romanesque Revival (current building)
- Groundbreaking: 1903 (current building)
- Completed: 1905

Administration
- Archdiocese: Roman Catholic Archdiocese of Taiyuan

Clergy
- Archbishop: Paul Meng Zhuyou

Chinese name
- Simplified Chinese: 太原圣母无染原罪主教座堂
- Traditional Chinese: 太原聖母無染原罪主教座堂
Transcriptions
Standard Mandarin
- Hanyu Pinyin: Tàiyuán Shèngmǔ Wúrǎn Yuánzuì Zhǔjiàozuòtáng

The Immaculate Conception Cathedral (Chinese: 太原圣母无染原罪主教座堂) (Note: In Chinese, the cathedral is also known as Taiyuan Catholic Church (Chinese: 太原天主堂; pinyin: Tàiyuán tiānzhǔtáng; lit. 'Taiyuan Catholic Church'). A 1947 military court verdict mentions this name. The Chinese State Council also used this name to refer to the cathedral in 2013.) is the cathedral of the Roman Catholic Archdiocese of Taiyuan, Shanxi, China. It was founded in 1635 and rebuilt twice in 1870 and 1902, and it is the largest Catholic church building in Taiyuan.

== History ==
=== The first church building (1635–1724) ===
Catholicism entered Shanxi in 1620. The Jesuit missionary Michel Trigault (Chinese: 金弥格; pinyin: Jīn mí gé), nephew of Nicolas Trigault, came to Taiyuan in 1633 and founded the church in 1635. According to Anthony E. Clark in his book Heaven in Conflict: Franciscans and the Boxer Uprising in Shanxi, the church was a "modest Roman Catholic chapel". Michel Trigault was later arrested in 1665, interrogated, and died in confinement in Guangdong in September 1667.

In 1724, the Yongzheng Emperor proscribed Catholicism in Qing China, and Catholic activities in Taiyuan ceased. The Qing government confiscated the church building during his reign.

=== The second church building (1870–1900) ===
The second church building was built in 1870 by the Italian Franciscan missionary Luigi Moccagatta, who began his office as the apostolic vicar of Shanxi at the same year. Wang Ying and Li Jin claimed that this church building faced south rather than west. They asserted that the direction appealed to traditional Chinese culture.

On 24 June 1900, Boxer rebels destroyed the church building during the Taiyuan massacre. Twenty-six clergy members, including the apostolic vicar Gregorio Grassi, were killed. In 1901, two foreign missionaries by the Chinese names of An Huaizhen (Chinese: 安懷珍) and Liu Bodi (Chinese: 劉博第) arranged a compensation of 2,500,000 taels with the Qing Government. They also negotiated with the Qing official Shen Dunhe and took Lingde Hall (Chinese: 令德堂) from Lingde Hall Academy (Chinese: 令德堂書院) as a substitute for the cathedral.

=== The third church building (1902– ) ===
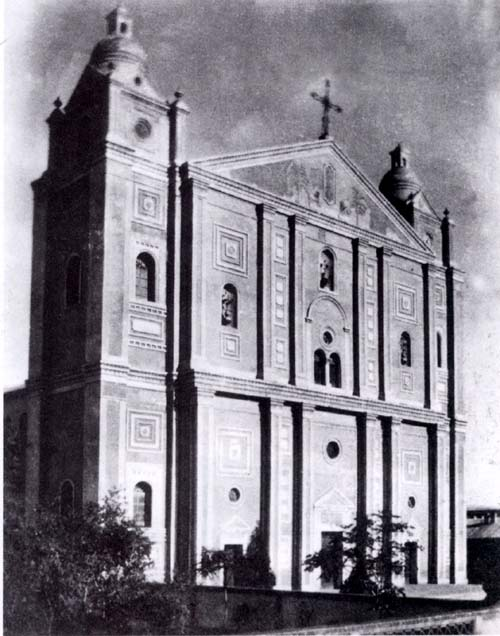
The front façade of the cathedral, 1907

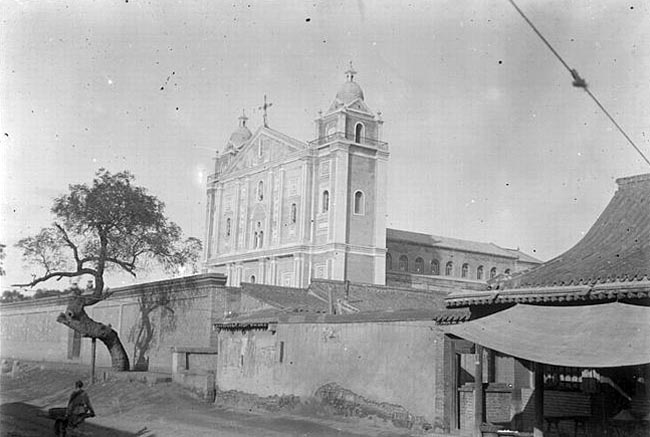
The cathedral and its surroundings in 1907, photographed by Édouard Chavannes

In July 1902, Agapito Fiorentini was appointed as the apostilic vicar of Northern Shanxi. On 4 December 1902, due to opposition from Shanxi students, he negotiated with Zhao Erxun and returned Lingde Hall to Lingde Hall Academy. Zhao compensated Fiorentini 2,000,000 taels to build a new cathedral.

In 1903, Fiorentini initiated the construction of the third church building, which was completed in 1905. The entire church complex had a total area of 133,000 m^{2} (33 acres).

During the Cultural Revolution, most of the church complex was destroyed. Only the cathedral, the clergy's office, and the convent remains. The current site area is 16,860 m^{2} (4.17 acres), and the current building area is about 4,300 m^{2} (46,000 sq ft).

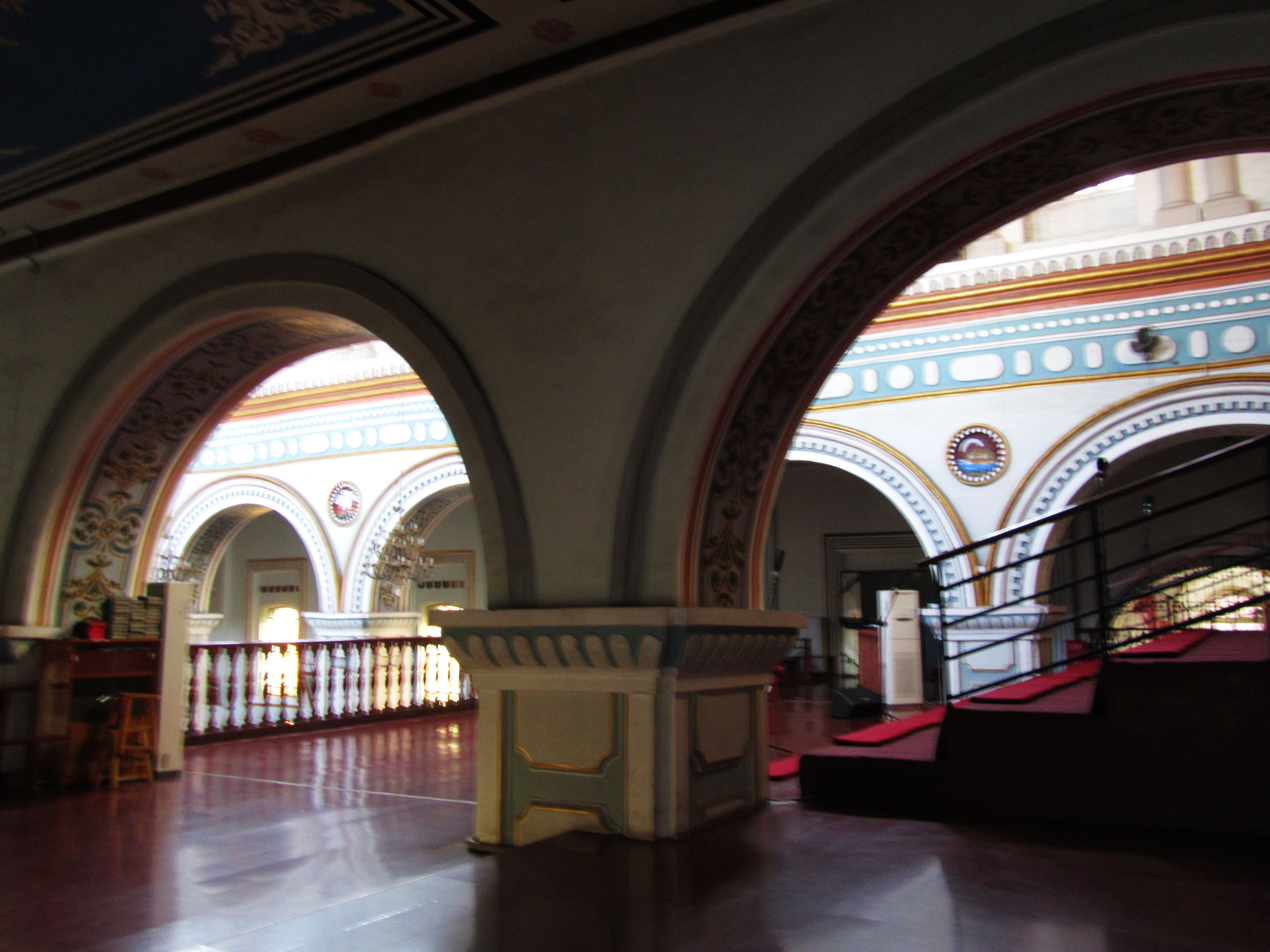
The choir loft of the cathedral was added in 1985.

In 1985, restoration work was carried out on the cathedral when cracks appeared on the walls due to foundation settlement. A choir's loft was added above the entrance of the cathedral, and the bell towers were rebuilt.

On 31 December 2005, Archbishop Sylvester Li Jiantang celebrated a mass at the cathedral commemorating the centennial anniversary of the completion of the current church building, with Bishop John Huo Cheng and Bishop John Baptist Wang Jin assisting.

In March 2013, the Chinese State Council listed the cathedral among the seventh batch of "Major National Historical and Cultural Sites".

== Architecture ==
=== Exterior ===
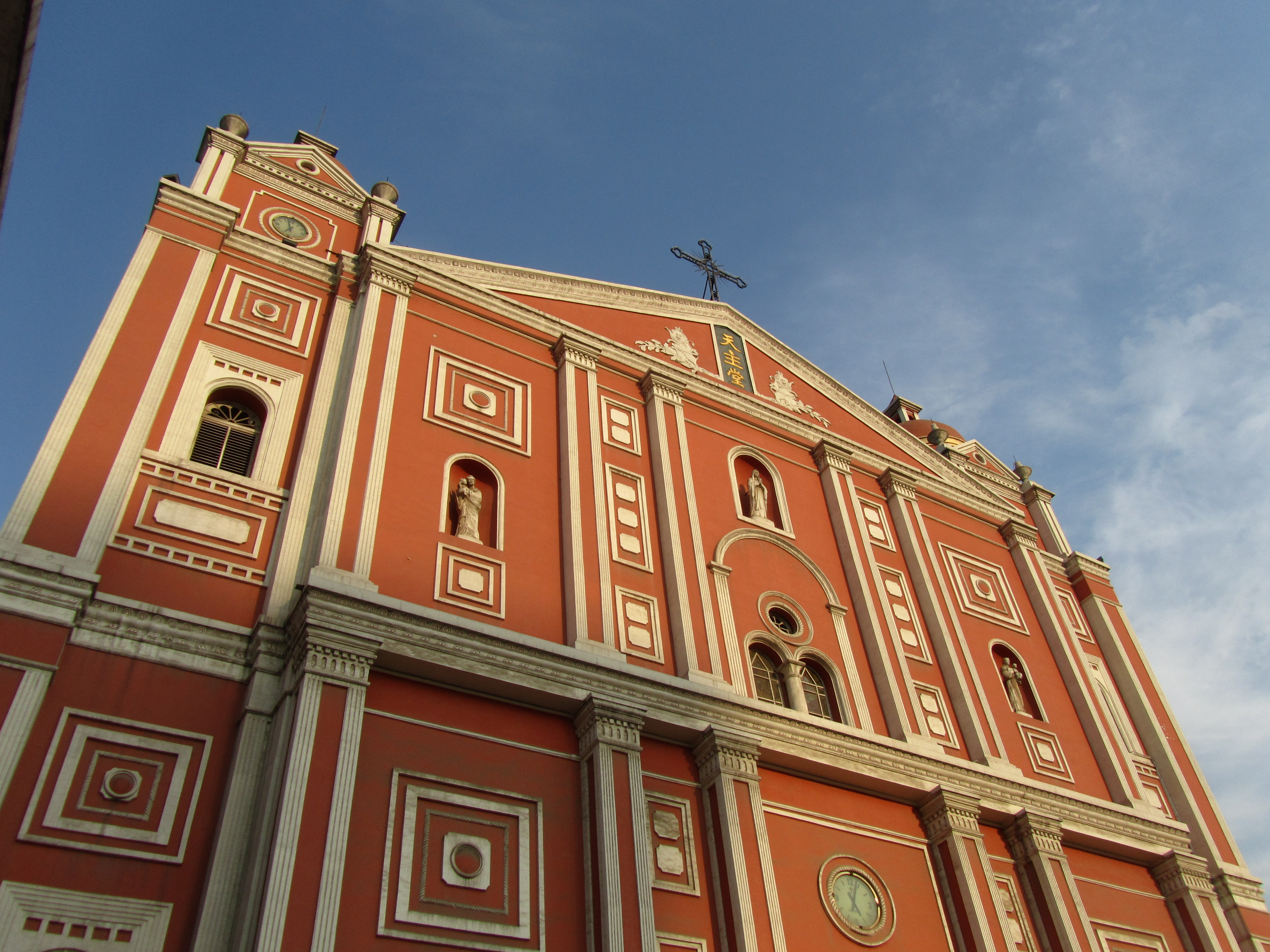
The rusty-red west façade of the cathedral, with three sculptures and an iron cross, 2012

According to Wang and Li, the cathedral has a simplified Romanesque Revival style. It faces west and has a Latin cross floor plan. It is 20 m (66 ft) tall, 34 m (112 ft) wide, 70 m (230 ft) long, and has an area of 1,400 m^{2} (15,000 sq ft). There are two bell towers, each 35.7 m (117 ft) tall, on both sides of the façade.

The southern bell tower had three bronze bells connected to the clock mechanism at the top of the tower. They could ring automatically according to the time. According to Wang and Li, the sound of the bells could be heard hundreds of Chinese miles away. The clock was from Italy and weighed over a thousand Chinese jin. The entire clock was dismantled during the Cultural Revolution, and its location is unknown.

The cathedral is constructed with bricks and masonry, featuring a wooden ceiling. It is in a rusty red color. Wang and Li speculated that the red color symbolizes the central, sacred status of the cathedral and commemorates the believers who died during the Boxer Rebellion.

==== Façade ====
The façade of the cathedral faces west. It has three vertical parts, and is horizontally divided into five unequal sections by six square pillars. Wang Ying and Li Jin observed that the capitals of the pillars are decorated in Chinese style. There are three doors at the bottom of the façade. Above each door, there is a circular window. The central door is the largest, and it is open only on feast days. The two side doors are smaller and are open for regular entry.

On the second floor of the façade, there are three arched niches each containing a sculpture. The original decorations were destroyed, and the sculptures were placed in 2000. On the third floor of the façade, there is a 6 m (20 ft) tall triangular gable signifying the Trinity. An 4 m (13 ft) tall iron cross is at the top of the cathedral.

Wang and Li claimed that the architecture of the façade contains religious ideas. The seven steps in front of the façade and the sevel-petalled arched windows correspond to the seven Catholic sacraments. The decorative pillars have five convex parts divided by four etched lines. According to Wang and Li, these decorations correspond to the five Joyful Mysteries and the four cardinal virtues.

=== Interior ===
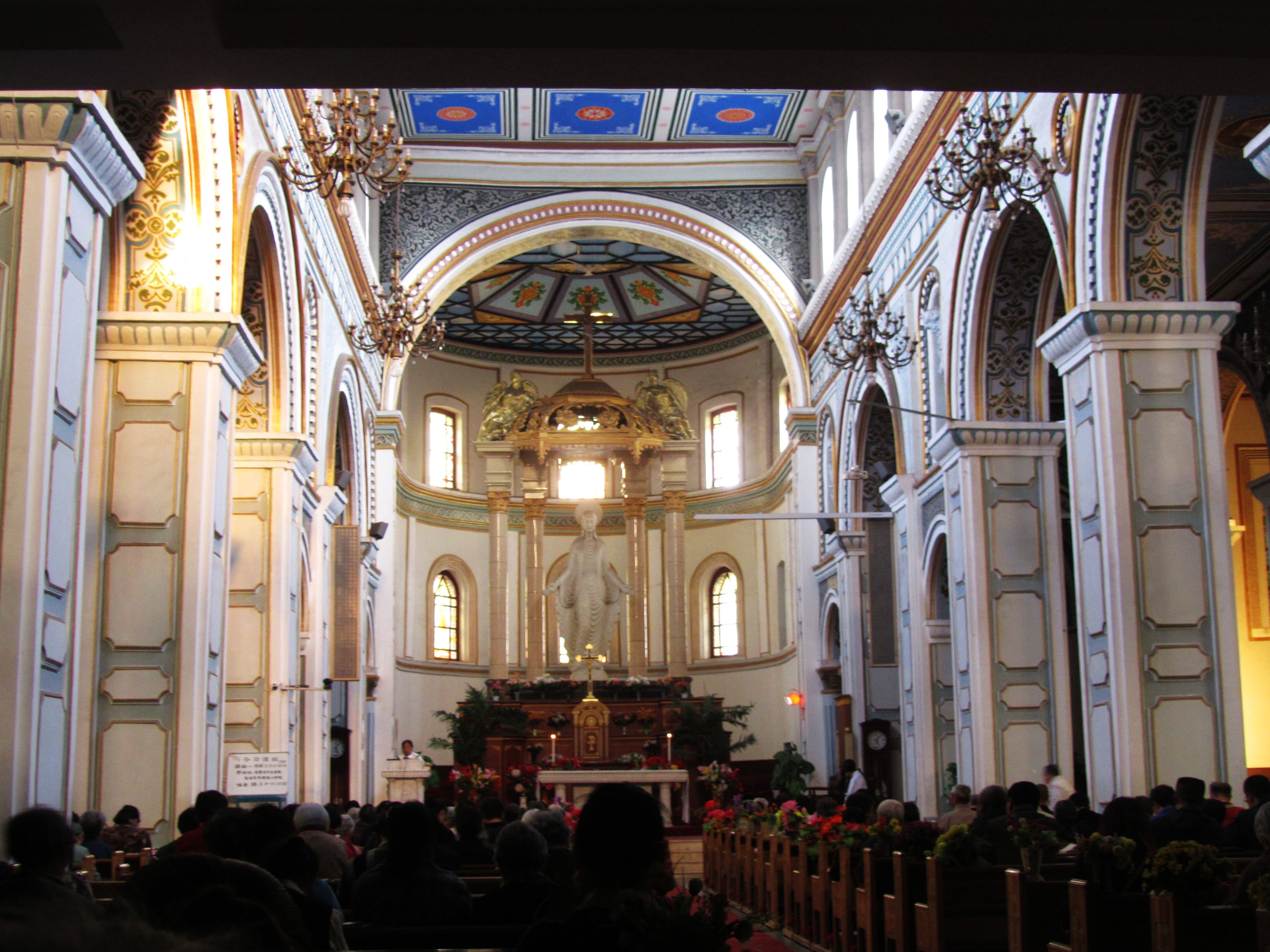
The interior of the cathedral, with the altar at the rear center and the square marble columns on both sides, 2012

The cathedral has a maximum occupancy of over 3,000 people. The ceiling height of the nave is 16 m (52 ft), which is about a third taller than the side aisles. Between the ceilings of the nave and the aisles, there are two sets of arched windows. The walls of the aisles are also lined with rectangular windows. There are coupled Ionic pillars between each pair of windows. There are 20 square marble columns along the two sides of the nave.

There are three altars at the rear of the cathedral, and there are two more altars on the side. According to Wang Zhengwu, the sculpture and carvings on the altar are extremely elaborate.

== Affiliated buildings and organizations ==
After the cathedral was completed, Fiorentini used the compensation to build other church buildings, including the clergy's office, a dining hall, two gardens, a priory, a convent, a nursery, religious schools for boys and girls, and a printing house of the Salesians of Don Bosco. These buildings were in the block currently surrounded by Jiefang Road, Dong Sandao Alley, Yongding Road, and East Chengfang Street.

- In 1902, St. Joseph's Hospital (Chinese: 若瑟醫院) was founded. It had both outpatient and inpatient services. Wang Ying and Li Jing claimed that the hospital was famous during its time. Currently, the site houses Taiyuan Central Hospital (Chinese: 太原中心医院).
- In 1912, Mingyuan School (Chinese: 明原學校) and St. Clare's Girls' School (Chinese: 加辣女校) were founded. Mingyuan School was the only private secondary school in Taiyuan. The site of Mingyuan School is currently occupied by Taiyuan No.4 High School (Chinese: 太原四中), and the site of St. Clare's Girls' School is occupied by Jiefang Road Elementary School (Chinese: 解放路小学).
