= Paul Ma Cunguo =

Chinese bishop

- Roman Catholic Bishop of the Roman Catholic Diocese of Shuozhou
- Church: Cathedral of Shuozhou
- Province: Shanxi
- Diocese: Roman Catholic Diocese of Shuozhou
- Installed: 2007
- Predecessor: Bonaventure Luo Juan

Orders
- Ordination: 1996

Personal details
- Born: 1969 (age 56–57) China
- Denomination: Roman Catholic

Chinese name
- Traditional Chinese: 馬存國
- Simplified Chinese: 马存国
Transcriptions
Standard Mandarin
- Hanyu Pinyin: Mǎ Cúnguó

Paul Ma Cunguo (Chinese: 马存国; born 1971) is a Chinese Roman Catholic Bishop of the Roman Catholic Diocese of Shuozhou since 2007.

== Biography ==
Ma was born into a Catholic family in 1971. He was ordained a priest on March 23, 1996. He accepted the episcopacy with the papal mandate on February 8, 2004. On March 15, 2007, after the death of his predecessor Bonaventure Luo Juan, he became bishop of Roman Catholic Diocese of Shuozhou.

Catholic Church titles
Previous: Bonaventure Luo Juan	Roman Catholic Bishop of the Roman Catholic Diocese of Shuozhou; 2007	Incumbent
