= Yang Shouren =

Chinese academic (born 1933)

Yang Shouren (Chinese: 杨守仁; born 22 April 1933) is a professor in the School of Earth and Space Sciences in Peking University.

== Life and career ==
Yang was born in Xiayang village in Putian, Fujian, China on April 22, 1933. He attended the First High School in Putian starting in February in 1951. After his graduation in July 1953, Yang enrolled in China University of Geosciences. Upon graduation with a bachelor's degree in 1957, he started to teach in the School of Earth and Space Sciences at Peking University. He taught and conducted research in the areas of geology, paleontology, and stratigraphy.

== Major accomplishments ==
In the 1980s, Yang finished five national projects by collaborating with other geologists. After 1992, he independently led and completed three national projects. He actively collaborated with other geologists worldwide and wrote 55 publications in total. His works were frequently cited, highly appraised, and received many awards.

In 1984, he received the award of Best Sci-Tech Achievements from the Ministry of Geology and Mineral Resources of P.R. China. In 1992, he won the Excellent Achievement Award in Eighty Five Major Sci-Tech Projects from China Petroleum Natural Gas Corporation.

In 1993 and 1996, one of his papers won the Sci-Tech Achievement Award from Peking University and the second place S&T Achievements Granted with National S&T Progress Awards from National Education Department respectively. Professor Yang also won Award of Teaching Excellency in Peking University in the academic year 1989-1990 and received a national award in 1998.

Yang Shouren, as the editor-in-chief, organized the compilation of the Geology volumes in China Earth Sciences series, which was published in 2018.

== Publications ==
Publications on conodonts:

1. 广西西部早、中三叠世序列；
2. 江西信丰县铁石口地区二叠—三叠纪牙形动物群的发现及其意义；
3. 江苏镇江Hypophice-ras 层中的二叠纪牙形石及其意义；
4. 贵州西南部"法郎组"牙形石及其时代；
5. Ladinian-Carnian Conodonts and Their Biostratigraphy in Asia；
6. 广西二叠—三叠系界线层牙形石演化、分带及二叠—三叠系界线
7. 中国三叠纪牙形石的古生物地理分区。

Publications on bivalves：

1. 北京西山门头沟群窑坡祖双壳类化石；
2. 广西西部早三叠世双壳类组合；
3. 海南岛南岸全新世海滩岩中的贝类及其气候特征。

Publications on cephalopods:

1. Cephalopods of the “Falang Formation”(Triassic) from Guanling and Zhenfeng Counties, Guizhou Province, China.

Publications on beach rocks:

1. Distribution of Holocene Beachrock in China and Climatic Changes；
2. 岛南岸全新世海滩岩中的贝类及其气候特征;
3. 中国全新世海滩岩分布与气候变化;
4. 浙江沿海全新世海滩岩基本特征及其古地理意义。

== Titles ==
Professor in the School of Earth and Space Sciences in Peking University, member of Geological Society of China, member of China Research Society of Palaeontology, member of Pander (Paleontological) Society, former committee member in the Ministry of Geology and Mineral Resources of P.R. China Paleontology Curriculum, former committee member in Geological Society of China Stratigraphic Palaeontology, former committee member in Palaeontological Society of China cephalopod, former Review Panel member in Department of Geology in Peking University, former Editorial board member for Journal of Paleogeography.
