= Giovanni Antonio Hofman =

- Bishop of the Roman Catholic Diocese of Lu'an
- Church: Cathedral of the Sacred Heart in Changzhi
- Diocese: Roman Catholic Diocese of Lu'an
- Installed: 24 April 1891
- Term ended: 20 July 1901
- Predecessor: Martin Poell
- Successor: Albertus Odoricus Timmer

Orders
- Ordination: 29 August 1858

Personal details
- Born: 12 June 1834 Voerden, North Holland, United Kingdom of the Netherlands
- Died: 26 October 1917 (aged 83) Wychen, Kingdom of the Netherlands
- Denomination: Roman Catholic

Giovanni Antonio Hofman (simplified Chinese: 贺广才; traditional Chinese: 賀廣才; pinyin: Hè Guǎngcái; 12 June 1834 – 26 October 1917) was a Dutch Catholic missionary prelate and bishop of the Roman Catholic Diocese of Lu'an from 1891 to 1901.

== Biography ==
Giovanni Antonio Hofman was born in Voerden, North Holland, United Kingdom of the Netherlands, on 12 June 1834. He joined the Franciscans on 4 October 1855. He was ordained a priest on 29 August 1858. In 1884, he was sent to the Qing Empire to preach, first in Hubei and then transferred to Shanxi. On 24 April 1891, he succeeded Martin Poell as bishop of the Roman Catholic Diocese of Lu'an. In the Boxer Rebellion in 1900, he fled to Lin County (now Linzhou), Henan, and returned to the Netherlands on 16 July 1901.

Giovanni Antonio Hofman died in Wychen on 26 October 1917, at the age of 83.

Catholic Church titles
Preceded by Martin Poell	Bishop of the Roman Catholic Diocese of Lu'an; 1891–1901	Succeeded by Albertus Odoricus Timmer
