= Martin Poell =

- Bishop of the Roman Catholic Diocese of Lu'an
- Church: Cathedral of the Sacred Heart in Changzhi
- Diocese: Roman Catholic Diocese of Lu'an
- Installed: 20 June 1890
- Term ended: 2 January 1891
- Predecessor: Luigi Moccagatta
- Successor: Giovanni Antonio Hofman

Orders
- Ordination: 1869

Personal details
- Born: 20 March 1845 Weert, Limburg, Kingdom of the Netherlands
- Died: 2 January 1891 (aged 45) Lucheng County, Shanxi, Qing Empire
- Denomination: Roman Catholic

Martin Poell (Chinese: 艾定禄; pinyin: Ài Dìnglù; 20 March 1845 – 2 January 1891) was a Dutch Catholic missionary prelate and bishop of the Roman Catholic Diocese of Lu'an from 1890 to 1891.

== Biography ==
Martin Poell was born in Weert, Limburg, Kingdom of the Netherlands, on 20 March 1845. He joined the Franciscans in 1861. He was ordained a priest in 1869. In 1873, he was sent to the Qing Empire to preach, first in Hubei and then transferred to Shanxi. On 14 July 1888, Martin Poell and Albertus Odoricus Timmer arrived at Machang Village (now a suburb) of Lucheng County. On 20 June 1890, he was appointed bishop of the Roman Catholic Diocese of Lu'an by the Holy See. On 2 January 1891, he died of typhoid fever in the village and was buried in the Sacred Heart Church at the age of 45.

Catholic Church titles
Preceded by Luigi Moccagatta	Bishop of the Roman Catholic Diocese of Lu'an; 1890–1891	Succeeded by Giovanni Antonio Hofman
