= Changzhi Medical College =

University in Changzhi, China

- 长治医学院
- The gate of Changzhi Medical College
- Type: Public university
- Established: 1946
- Location: Changzhi, Shanxi, China
- Website: http://www.czmc.com/

Changzhi Medical College (Chinese: 长治医学院) is a university in Changzhi, Shanxi, China under the authority of the provincial government. It is one of several medical schools in the Shanxi province of China.

Its predecessor was the Nursing School affiliated to the Taihang Bethune International Peace Hospital, which was established in 1946. Changzhi Medical College itself began teaching in 1958.
