= Diocese of Shuozhou =

Roman Catholic diocese in China

Diocese of Shuozhou Dioecesis Scioceuvensis 天主教朔州教区
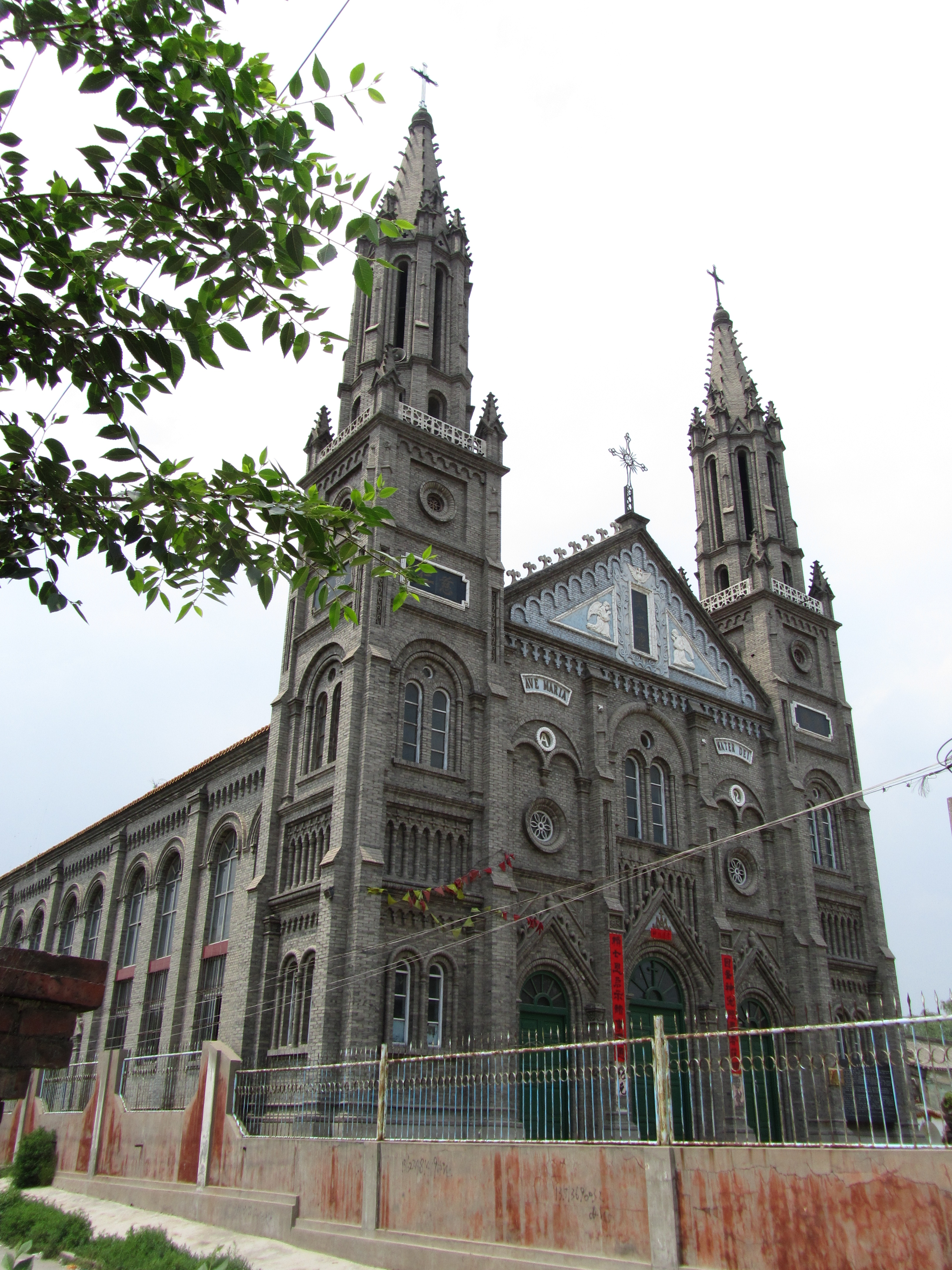
- Cathedral of Shuozhou

Location
- Country: China
- Ecclesiastical province: Taiyuan
- Metropolitan: Taiyuan

Statistics
- Area: 25,000 km^{2} (9,700 sq mi)
- Population: Total; Catholics: (as of 1950); 1,300,000; 11,000 (0.8%)

Information
- Rite: Latin Rite
- Cathedral: Cathedral of Our Lady, Shuozhou

Current leadership
- Pope: Leo XIV
- Bishop: Paul Ma Cun-guo
- Metropolitan Archbishop: Sylvester Li Jian-tang

The Roman Catholic Diocese of Shuozhou/Shuoxian (Latin: Scioceuven(sis), Chinese: 朔州, 朔縣) is a diocese located in the city of Shuozhou (Shanxi) in the ecclesiastical province of Taiyuan in China.

== History ==
- July 12, 1926: Established as the Apostolic Prefecture of Shohchow 朔州 from the Apostolic Vicariate of Taiyuanfu 太原府, entrusted to Franciscans from Bavaria.
- June 17, 1932: Promoted as Apostolic Vicariate of Shohchow 朔州
- April 11, 1946: Promoted as Diocese of Shuozhou 朔州

== Leadership ==
- Bishops of Shuozhou(Roman rite)
  - Bishop Paul Ma Cunguo (2007–present)
  - Bishop Bonaventure Luo Juan (1990 - 2007)
  - Bishop Edgar Anthony Haering, O.F.M. (俞廣仁) (April 11, 1946 – July 25, 1971)
- Vicars Apostolic of Shohchow 朔州 (Roman Rite)
  - Bishop Edgar Anthony Haering, O.F.M. (俞廣仁) (1933.04.25 – 1946.04.11)
- Prefects Apostolic of Shohchow 朔州 (Roman Rite)
  - Fr. Edgar Anthony Haering, O.F.M. (俞廣仁) (later Bishop) (1927.07.13 – 1932.06.17)
