= Cathedral of Our Lady, Shuozhou =

- 朔州主教座堂
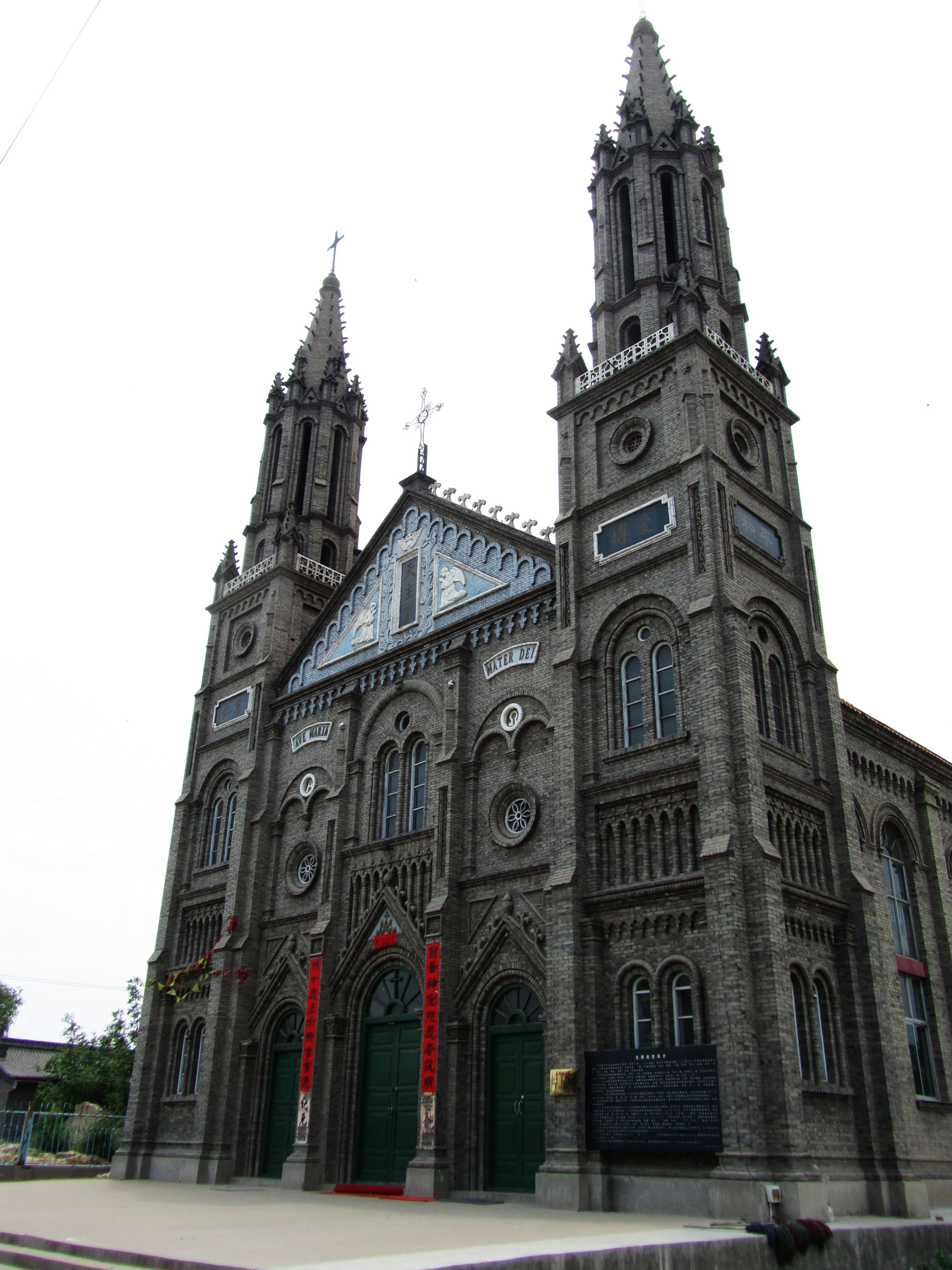
- Cathedral of Our Lady, Shuozhou in 2011

- Location in Shanxi
- 39°19′21″N 112°25′54″E
- Location: Shuocheng District, Shuozhou, Shanxi, China
- Denomination: Roman Catholic

History
- Status: Parish church
- Founded: 1913

Architecture
- Functional status: Active
- Architectural type: Church building
- Style: Gothic architecture
- Groundbreaking: 1998
- Completed: 2000 (reconstruction)

Specifications
- Materials: Granite, bricks

Administration
- Diocese: Roman Catholic Diocese of Shuozhou

The Cathedral of Our Lady, Shuozhou (Chinese: 朔州主教座堂; pinyin: Shuòzhōu Zhǔjiàozuòtáng) is the cathedral of Shuozhou in Shanxi, China.

== History ==
The Cathedral of Our Lady was originally built in 1913 with a Gothic architecture style. Since 1946, it was successively occupied by the He Long No.3 Middle School, Suimeng Military District and Shuo County Normal School.

The bell tower was smashed by the Red Guards during the ten-year Cultural Revolution. The Cathedral of Our Lady was returned to the church in 1996. Renovations and rebuilding to the cathedral began in 1998 and were completed in July 2000.

== Architecture ==
The Cathedral of Our Lady is located in the west and faces the east with a Gothic architecture style. It is 40 metres (130 ft) long, 16 metres (52 ft) wide and 12 metres (39 ft) high. It has two 32.8-metre (108 ft) high bell towers.

== Gallery ==
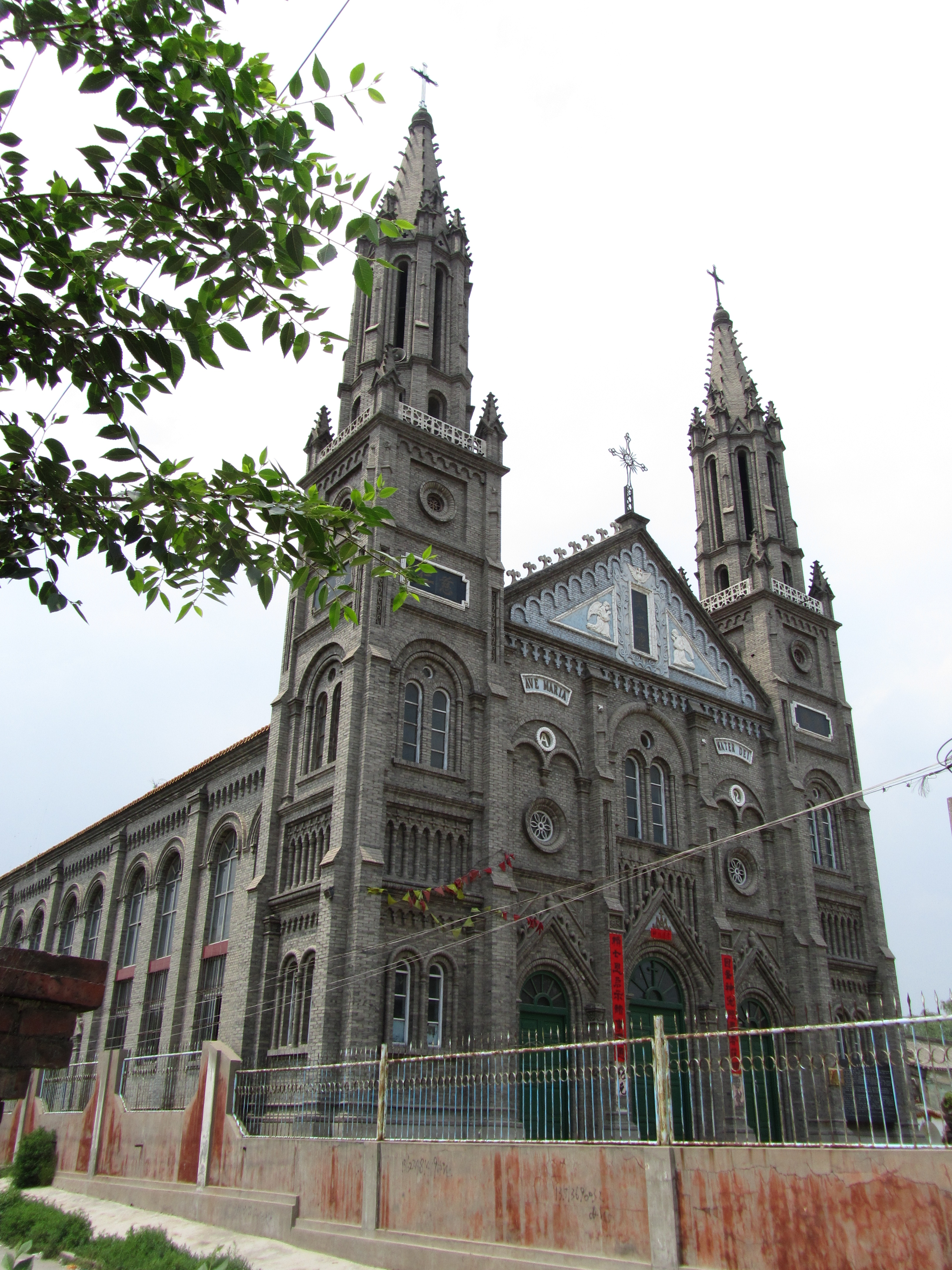
The southeast

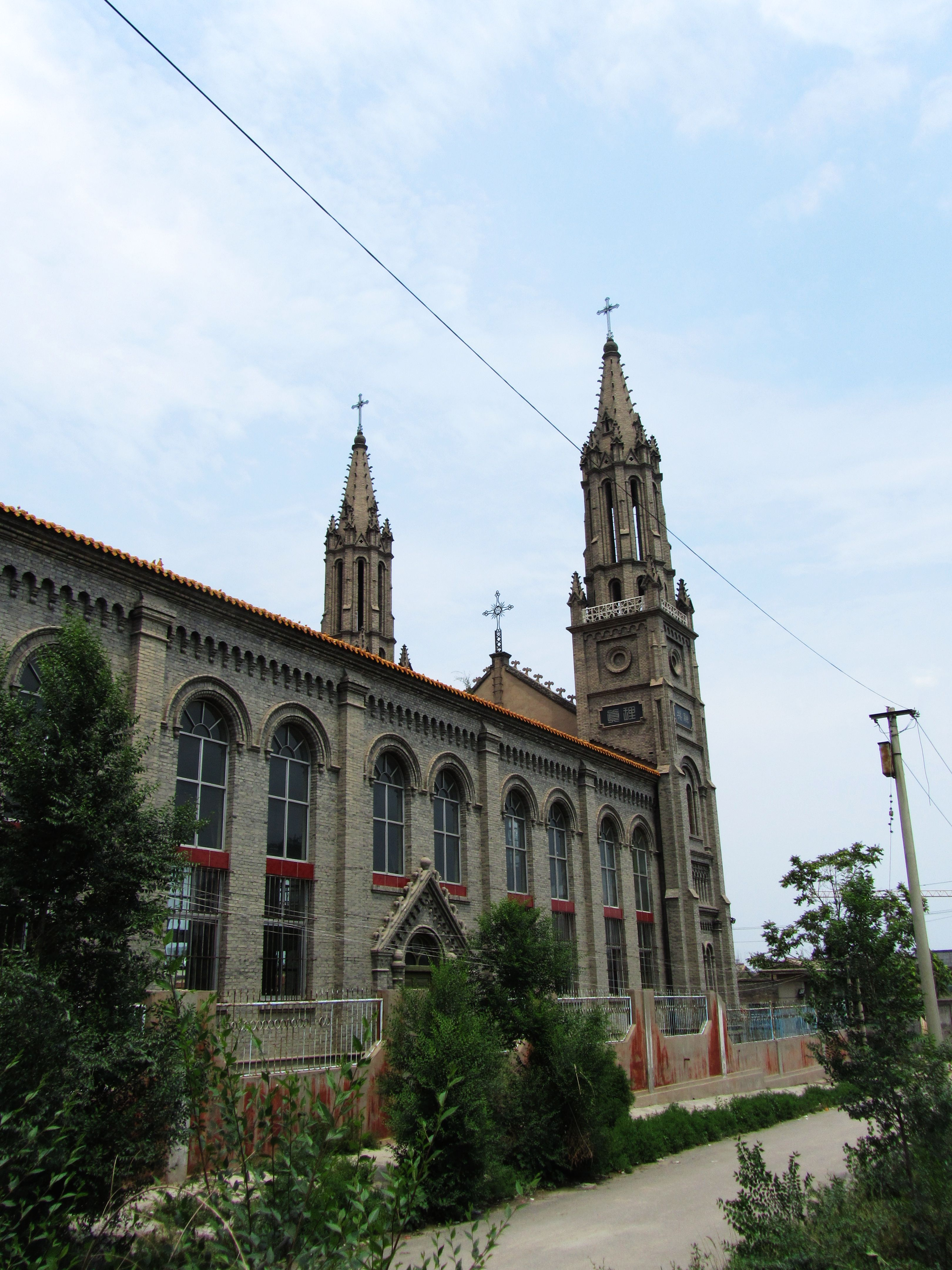
The southwest

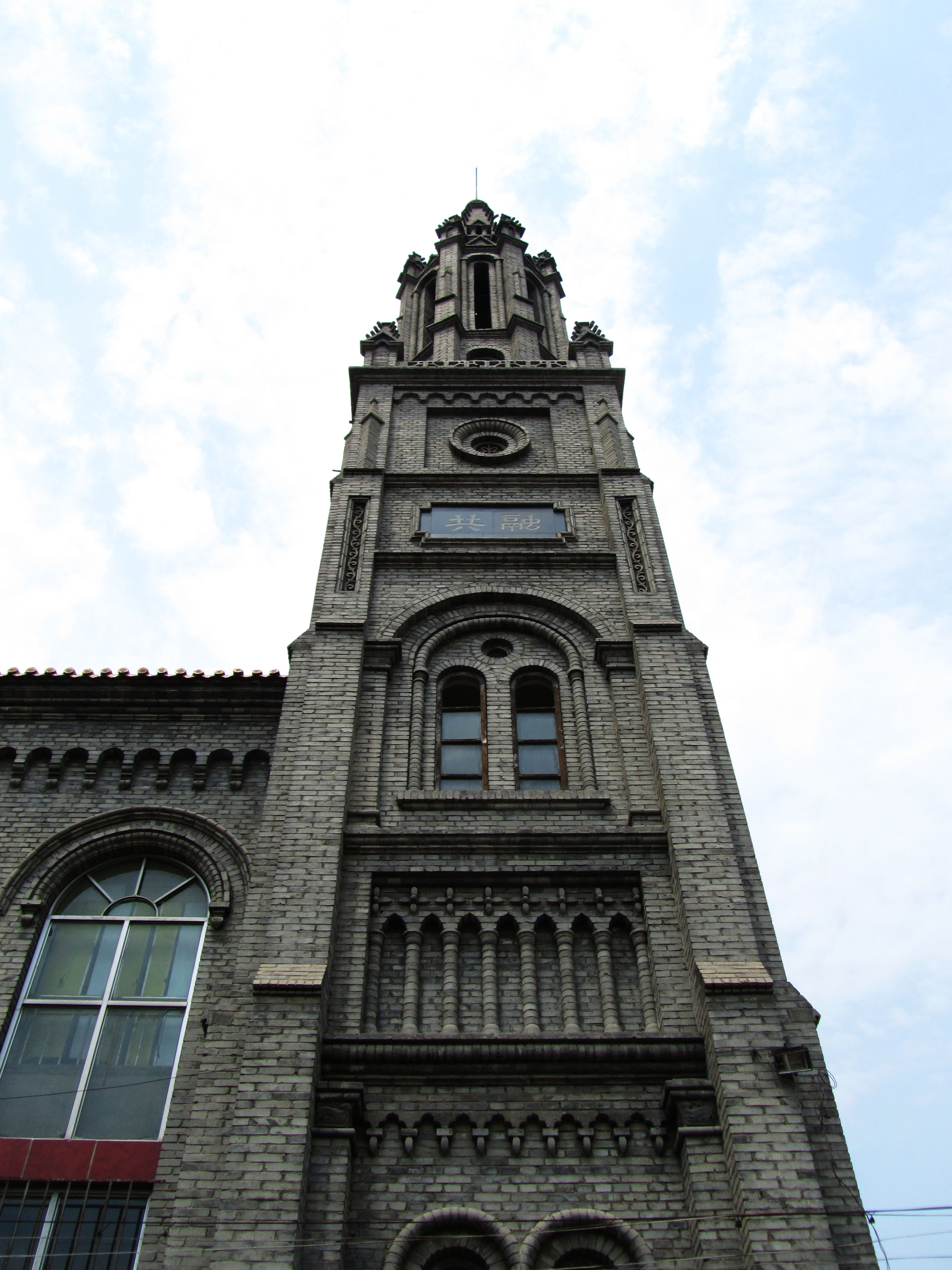
Bell tower
