= Roman Catholic Archdiocese of Taiyuan =

Roman Catholic archdiocese in China

Coordinates: 37.8834°N 112.5560°E

Archdiocese of Taiyuan Archidioecesis Taeiuenensis 天主教太原总教区
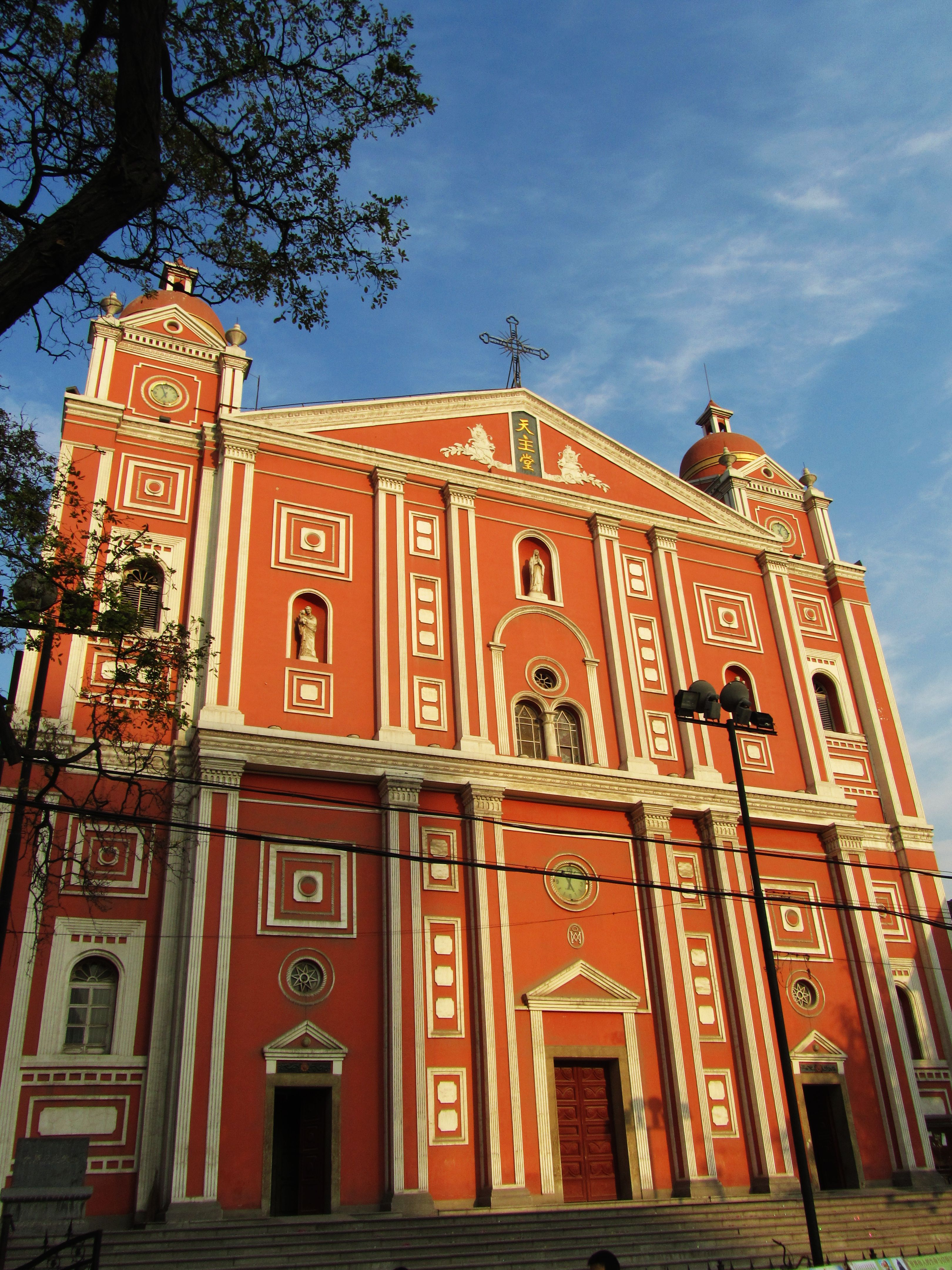
- Cathedral of the Immaculate Conception in Taiyuan

Location
- Country: China
- Ecclesiastical province: Taiyuan

Statistics
- Area: 16,000 km^{2} (6,200 sq mi)
- Population: Total; Catholics: (as of 1950); 1,500,000; 40,749

Information
- Rite: Latin Rite
- Cathedral: Cathedral of the Immaculate Conception, Taiyuan

Current leadership
- Pope: Francis
- Metropolitan Archbishop: Paul Meng Zhuyou

The Roman Catholic Archdiocese of Taiyuan (Latin: Taeiuenen(sis), Chinese: 太原) is an archdiocese located in the city of Taiyuan (Shanxi) in China.

== History ==
- June 17, 1890: Established as Apostolic Vicariate of Northern Shansi 山西北境 from the Apostolic Vicariate of Shansi 山西
- December 3, 1924: Renamed as Apostolic Vicariate of Taiyuanfu 太原府
- April 11, 1946: Promoted as Metropolitan Archdiocese of Taiyuan 太原
- August 28, 2022: The Beihan Church (北寒天主堂) in Taiyuan was demolished by the local authority.

== Leadership ==
- Archbishops of Taiyuan (Roman rite)
  - Archbishop Paul Meng Zhuyou (2013–present)
  - Archbishop Sylvester Li Jian-tang (1994–2013)
  - Archbishop Benedict Bonaventura Zhang Xin (1981–1994)
  - Archbishop Domenico Luca Capozi, O.F.M. (李路加) (April 11, 1946 – 1983)
- Vicars Apostolic of Taiyuanfu 太原府 (Roman Rite)
  - Bishop Domenico Luca Capozi, O.F.M. (李路加) (later Archbishop) (January 12, 1940 – April 11, 1946)
  - Bishop Agapito Augusto Fiorentini, O.F.M. (鳳朝瑞) (December 3, 1924 – 1938)
- Vicars Apostolic of Northern Shansi 山西北境 (Roman Rite)
  - Bishop Agapito Augusto Fiorentini, O.F.M. (鳳朝瑞) (July 7, 1916 – December 3, 1924)
  - Bishop Eugenio Massi, O.F.M. (希賢) (February 15, 1910 – July 7, 1916)
  - Bishop Agapito Augusto Fiorentini, O.F.M. (鳳朝瑞) (March 16, 1902 – November 18, 1909)
  - Saint Bishop Gregorio Maria Grassi, O.F.M. (艾士杰) (June 17, 1890 – July 19, 1900)

== Suffragan dioceses ==
- Datong 大同
- Fenyang 汾陽
- Hongdong 洪洞
- Lu’an 潞安
- Shuozhou 朔州
- Yuci 榆次

== Sources ==
- GCatholic.org
- Catholic Hierarchy
