= Sylvester Li Jiantang =

Chinese Roman Catholic archbishop

- Bishop of Taiyuan
- Native name: 李建唐
- Church: Catholic Church
- Archdiocese: Archdiocese of Taiyuan
- In office: 18 December 1994 – 24 November 2013
- Predecessor: Domenico Luca Capozi
- Successor: Paul Meng Zhuyou
- Previous post: Coadjutor Bishop of Taiyuan (1990-1994)

Orders
- Ordination: March 1956
- Consecration: 18 December 1994 by Benedict Bonaventura Zhang Xin

Personal details
- Born: 23 December 1925
- Died: 13 August 2017 (aged 91)

Sylvester Li Jiantang (Chinese: 李建唐; 23 December 1925 – 13 August 2017) was a Catholic archbishop.

Li Jiantang was ordained to the priesthood in 1956. He served as archbishop of the Roman Catholic Archdiocese of Taiyuan, China, from 1994 until 2013.

== Notes ==
Catholic Church titles
Previous: Domenico Luca Capozi	Metropolitan Archbishop of the Roman Catholic Archdiocese of Taiyuan; 1994-2013	Next: Paul Meng Zhuyou
