= Paul Meng Zhuyou =

Chinese Roman Catholic bishop (born 1963)

The Most Reverend Paul Meng Zhuyou
- Metropolitan Archbishop of Taiyuan
- Native name: 孟寧友
- Church: Cathedral of the Immaculate Conception in Taiyuan
- Archdiocese: Roman Catholic Archdiocese of Taiyuan
- Appointed: 24 November 2013
- Predecessor: Sylvester Li Jian-tang

Orders
- Ordination: 29 June 1991
- Consecration: 16 September 2010 by Bishop Sylvester Li Jiantang (Liu Jiantang)

Personal details
- Born: January 8, 1963 (age 63) Taiyuan, China
- Denomination: Roman Catholic
- Motto: CONCORDIAM IN CARITATE / 和衷共濟
- Coat of arms

Chinese name
- Traditional Chinese: 孟寧友
- Simplified Chinese: 孟宁友
Transcriptions
Standard Mandarin
- Hanyu Pinyin: Mèng Níngyǒu

Paul Meng Zhuyou (Chinese: 孟宁友; born January 8, 1963) is a Chinese Catholic clergyman and Metropolitan Archbishop of the Roman Catholic Archdiocese of Taiyuan from 2013.

== Biography ==
He was ordained a priest on June 29, 1991. He accepted the episcopacy with a papal mandate on September 16, 2010. On November 24, 2013, he became Archbishop of Taiyuan Metropolitan, replacing his predecessor Bishop Sylvester Li Jian-tang. His appointment was endorsed by the Holy See and the Chinese government.

Catholic Church titles
Previous: Sylvester Li Jian-tang	Metropolitan Archbishop of the Roman Catholic Archdiocese of Taiyuan; 2013	Incumbent
