= Leon-Jean-Marie De Smedt =

- Bishop of the Roman Catholic Diocese of Xiwanzi
- Church: Cathedral in Chongli
- Archdiocese: Roman Catholic Archdiocese of Suiyuan
- Installed: 14 December 1931
- Term ended: 24 November 1951
- Predecessor: Everard Ter Laak
- Successor: Melchior Zhang Kexing

Orders
- Ordination: 16 July 1905

Personal details
- Born: 3 December 1881 Sint-Niklaas, Flemish Region, Belgium
- Died: 16 November 1951 (aged 69) Zhangjiakou, Hebei, China
- Denomination: Roman Catholic

Leon-Jean-Marie De Smedt (Chinese: 石德懋; pinyin: Shí Démào; 3 December 1881 – 16 November 1951) was a Belgian Catholic priest, missionary, and Bishop of the Roman Catholic Diocese of Xiwanzi between 1931 and 1951. He was a member of the CICM Missionaries.

== Biography ==
Leon-Jean-Marie De Smedt was born in Sint-Niklaas, Flemish Region, Belgium, on 3 December 1881. In 1899, he joined the Assembly of the Immaculate Heart of Mary. He was ordained a priest on 16 July 1905. In 1906, the CICM Missionaries sent him to preach in the Roman Catholic Diocese of Xiwanzi. On 14 December 1931, Pope Pius XI appointed him Bishop of the Roman Catholic Diocese of Xiwanzi, succeeding Everard Ter Laak. On 17 April 1932, he was consecrated in the Cathedral by Louis van Dyck, Louis Janssens and Evarist Zhang Zhiliang.

After the outbreak of the Pacific War, Leon-Jean-Marie De Smedt and other Belgian missionaries were detained by the Imperial Japanese Army in both Weixian Internment Camp and Beiping Internment Camp, until they were released in 1945. During the Chinese Civil War, the Cathedral was completely destroyed. Leon-Jean-Marie De Smedt moved to Zhangjiakou.

On 24 May 1951, Leon-Jean-Marie De Smedt held a consecration ceremony for Assistant Bishop Melchior Zhang Kexing. On 20 September 1951, he was arrested by the Communist government and the Legion of Mary was dissolved. Leon-Jean-Marie De Smedt died in prison on November 16.

Catholic Church titles
Previous: Everard Ter Laak	Bishop of the Roman Catholic Diocese of Xiwanzi; 1931–1951	Next: Melchior Zhang Kexing
