= Joseph Wang Zhengui =

Bishop of Zhangjiakou

- Bishop of Zhangjiakou
- Church: Catholic Church
- Diocese: Zhangjiakou
- Appointed: 8 July 2025
- Installed: 8 September 2025
- Predecessor: Giuseppe Ma Yan’en (bishop of Xiwanzi; Augustine Cui Tai (bishop of Xuanhua

Orders
- Ordination: 24 May 1990

Personal details
- Born: 19 November 1962 (age 63) Zhangjiakou, China

Joseph Wang Zhengui (Chinese: 王振贵; pinyin: Wáng Zhènguì; born 19 November 1962) is a Chinese prelate who is the bishop of the Diocese of Zhangjiakou. He was active in the dioceses of Xianxian and Xuanhua before his appointment as bishop in 2025.

== Early life and education ==
Wang Zhengui was born in Zhangjiakou, on 19 November 1962, and was later given the Christian name of Joseph. He attended the provincial seminary of Hebei from 1984 to 1988. He conducted his pastoral apprenticeship in the parish of Shijiazhuang from 1989 to 1990.

== Career ==
Wang was ordained as a priest in the Diocese of Xianxian on 24 May 1990. He was appointed as a parish priest in 1991, and ministered in the Diocese of Xuanhua. He was elected rector of the Diocese of Zhangjiakou on 15 August 1996. In October 2007, Wang was appointed Deputy Secretary General of the Hebei Provincial Episcopal Conference and Chinese Catholic Patriotic Association (CCPA) in October 2007, and as deputy director in December 2013.

Wang sought to increase the number of priests in Zhangjiakou before the 2022 Winter Olympics. At that point, the diocese was recognised by the state-aligned CCPA, but not recognised by the Holy See. The Holy See criticised this as a violation of the agreement it made with China and stated that Bishop Joseph Guo Jincai overstepped his mandate by ordaining these priests.

The Diocese of Zhangjiakou, with a population of 85,000 Catholics, was established by China without papal approval in 1980. Pope Leo XIV recognised the diocese on 8 July 2025. Wang was selected to serve as its bishop and he received his episcopal consecration on 8 September. His appointment was approved by both the Holy See and China per an agreement in 2018. 300 Catholics, 50 priests, and senior leaders of the CCPA were present at his consecration. The episcopal ordination of Bishop Wang Zhengui of the Catholic Diocese of Zhangjiakou took place at a Catholic church in Zhangjiakou, a city located in Hebei Province in northern China. The ceremony was presided over by Li Shan, the president of the Chinese Catholic Patriotic Association and Archbishop of the Archdiocese of Beijing.

Giuseppe Ma Yan’en and Augustine Cui Tai, whose appointments as the bishops of Xiwanzi and Xuanhua were not recognised by the Chinese government, had their episcopal dignity recognised by the government. This occurred after their dioceses were suppressed and merged into Zhangjiakou. Ma was appointed as an auxiliary bishop for Wang on 12 September 2025.

== Works cited ==
=== News ===
- "天主教張家口教區舉行王振貴主教祝聖典禮". Radio France Internationale. 10 September 2025. Archived from the original on 7 November 2025.
- "ASIEN/CHINA - Joseph Wang Zhengui zum Bischof der neuen Diözese Zhangjiakou geweiht". Agenzia Fides. 10 September 2025. Archived from the original on 7 November 2025.
- "Bishop consecrated for Chinese diocese created by Pope Leo XIV". Vatican News. 10 September 2025. Archived from the original on 16 September 2025.
- "China: Giuseppe Ma Yan'en installed as Auxiliary Bishop of Zhangjiakou". Vatican News. 12 September 2025. Archived from the original on 17 September 2025.
- "Former illicit bishop accused of defying Vatican-China deal". Union of Catholic Asian News. 17 May 2021. Archived from the original on 15 April 2024.
- "Vatican provides details on Pope Leo's creation of new Chinese diocese". Catholic Herald. 13 September 2025. Archived from the original on 7 November 2025.
- Mares, Courtney (10 September 2025). "Pope Leo XIV creates 'new' China diocese amid diocesan border dispute with Beijing". Catholic News Agency. Archived from the original on 7 November 2025.

=== Web ===
- "Diocese of Zhangjiakou". Union of Catholic Asian News. Archived from the original on 7 November 2025.
