= List of cathedrals in China =

This is the list of cathedrals in China sorted by original denomination.

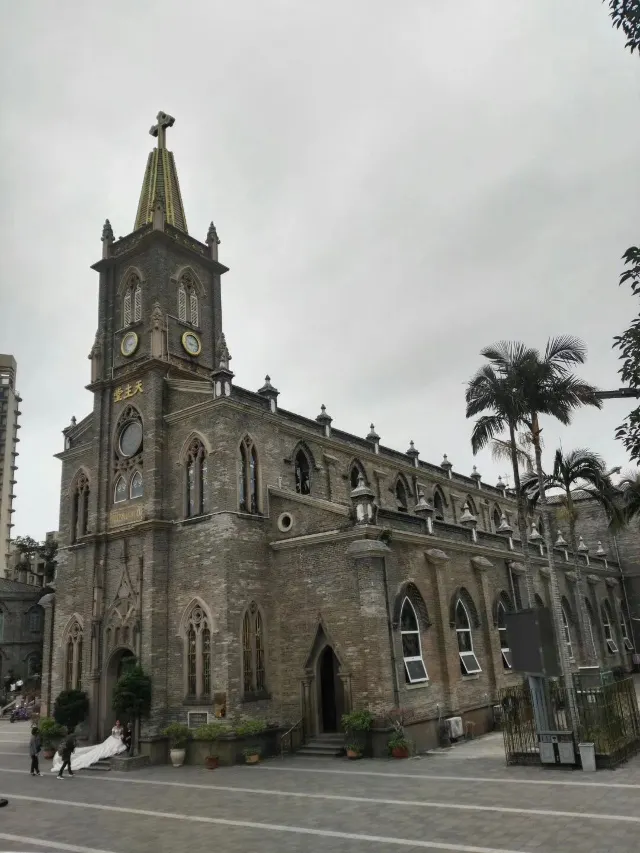
St. Dominic's Cathedral in Fuzhou

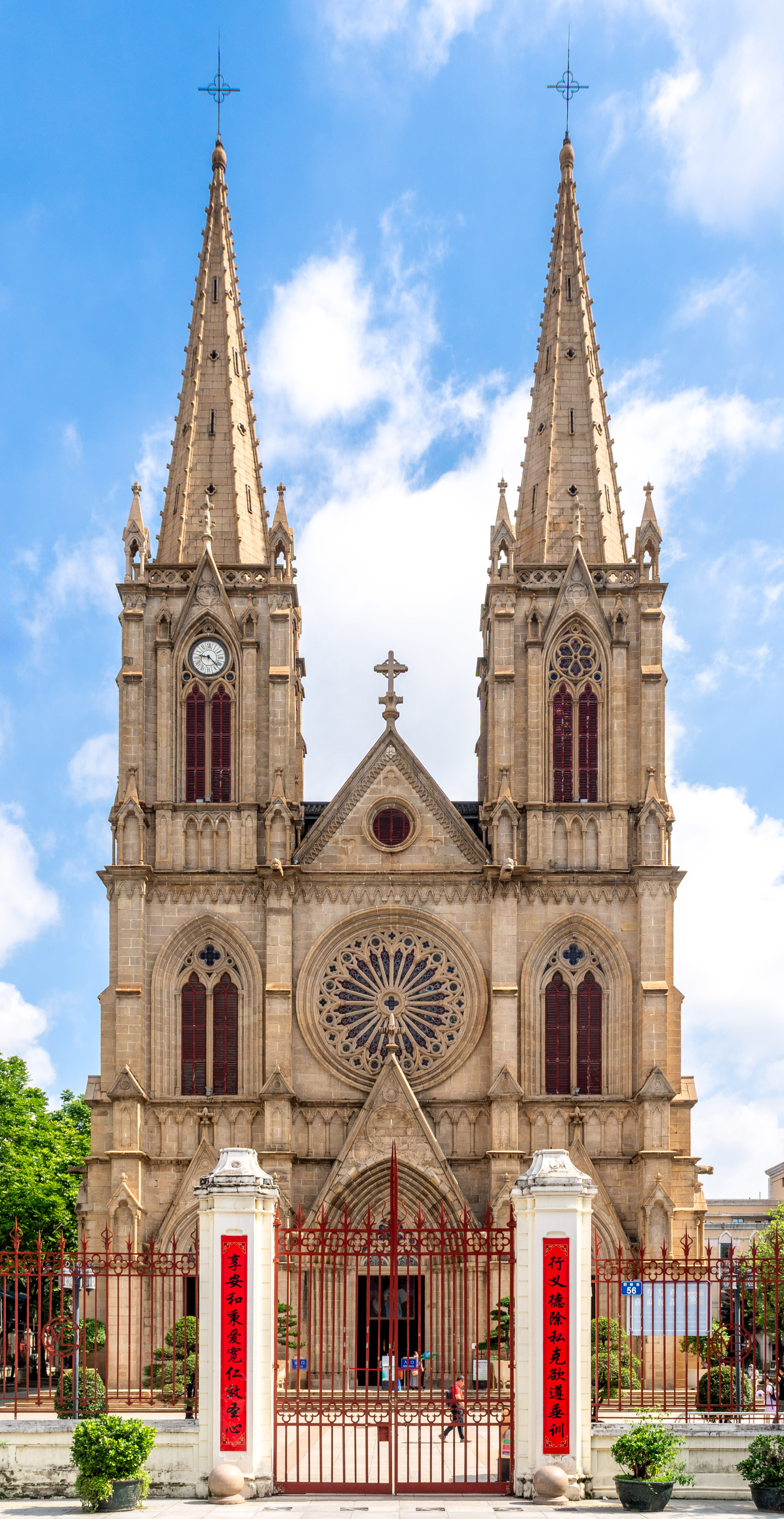
Sacred Heart Cathedral (Seksat Church) in Guangzhou.

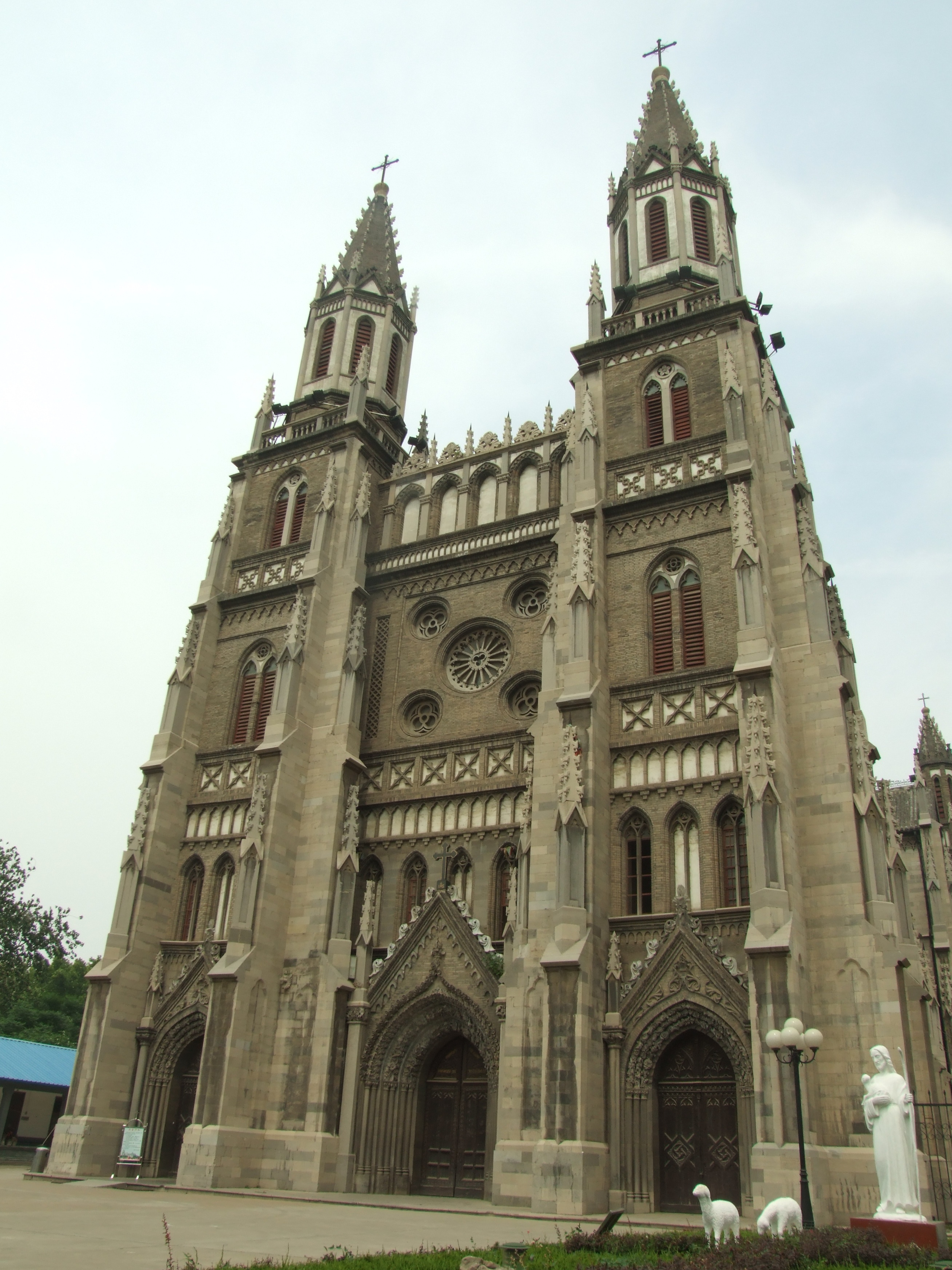
Sacred Heart Cathedral in Jinan.

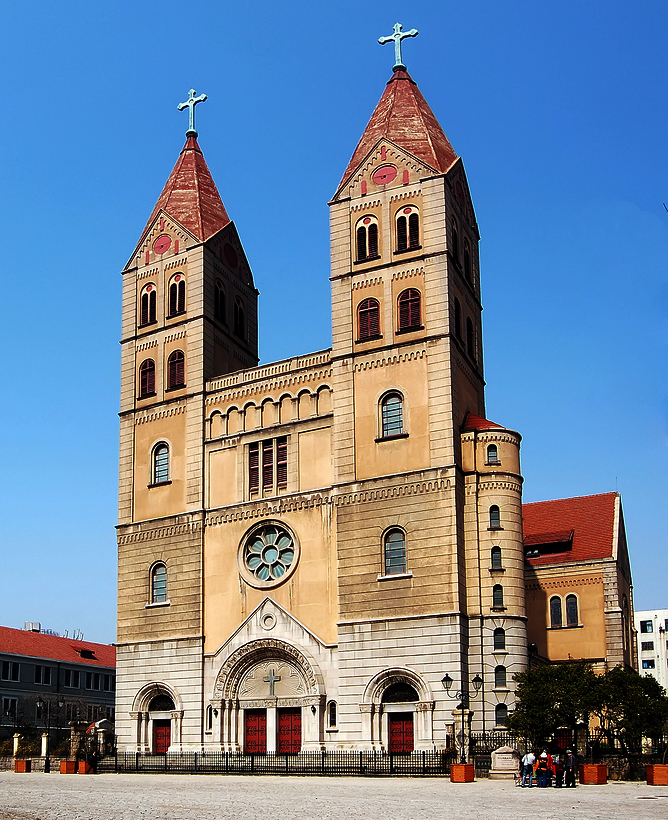
St. Michael's Cathedral in Qingdao.

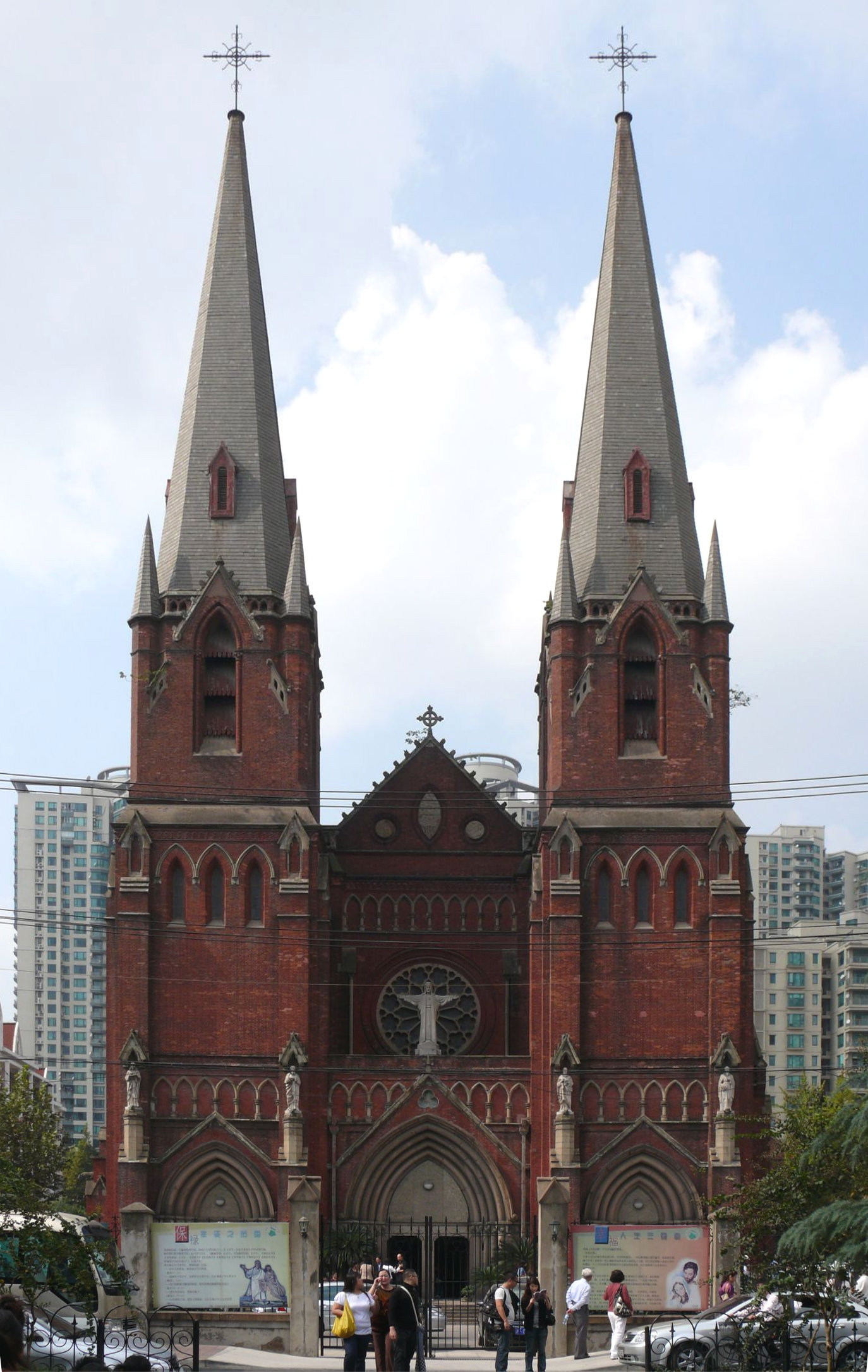
St. Ignatius Cathedral (Xujiahui Church) in Shanghai.

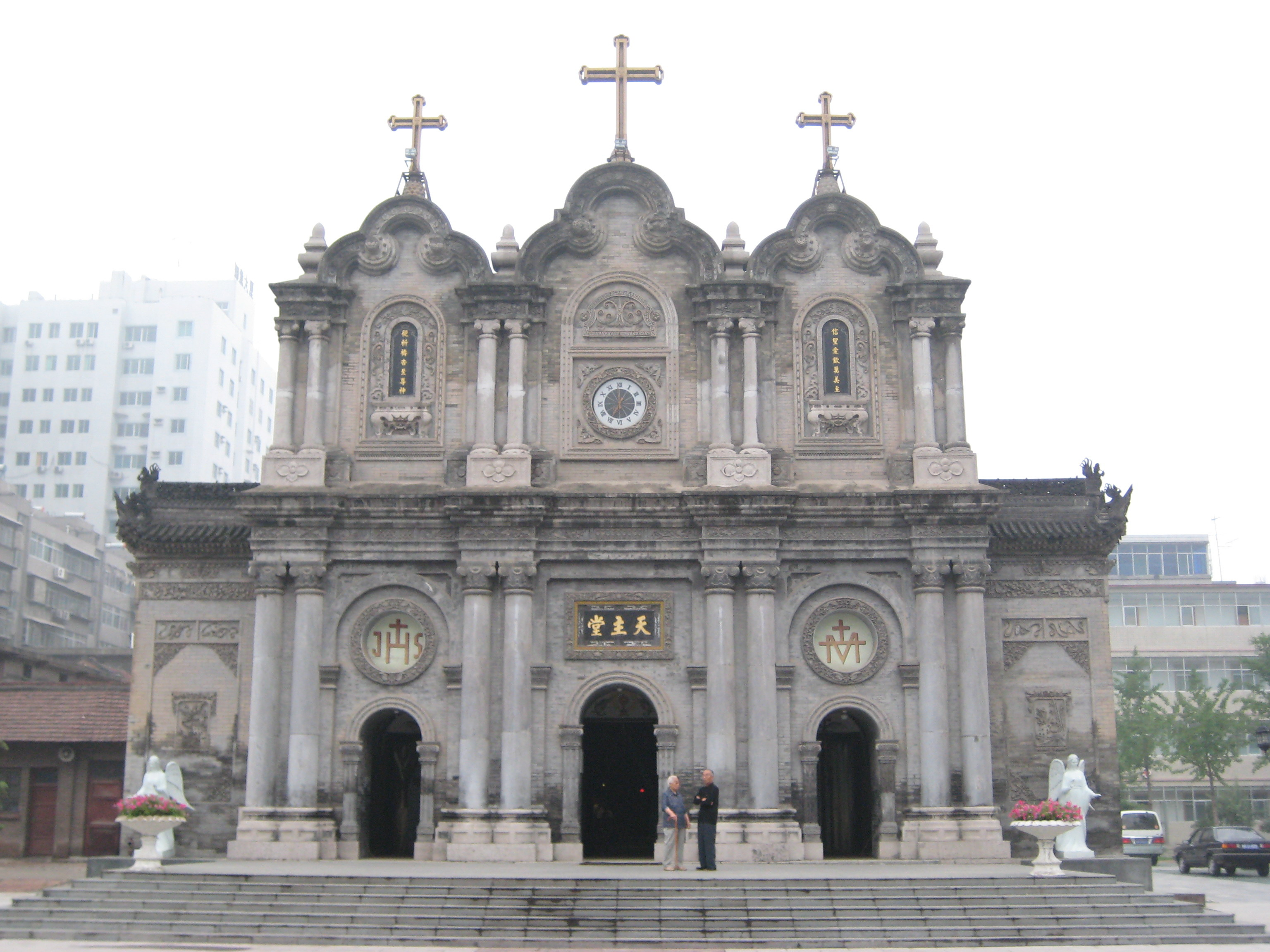
St. Francis Cathedral in Xi’an.

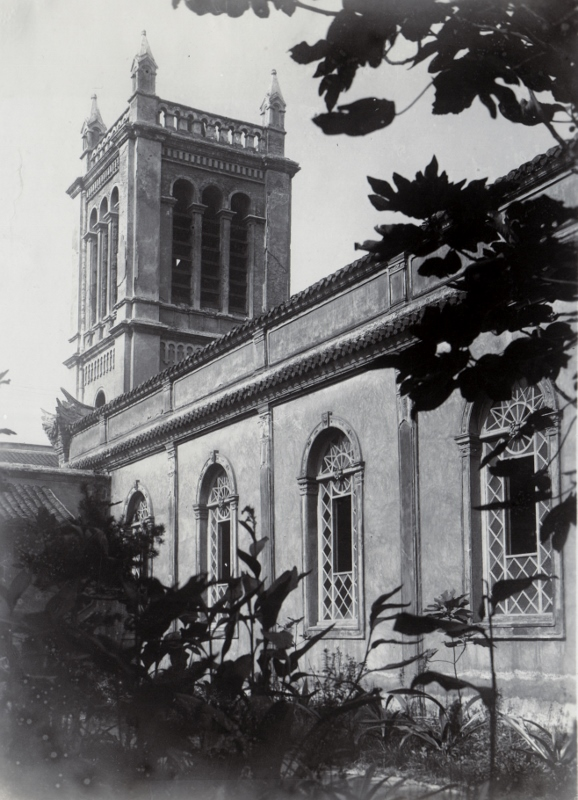
St. Joseph's Cathedral in Chongqing.

== Catholic ==
Cathedrals of the Catholic Church in China:

- Cathedral of Sts. Peter and Paul (Baoding) in Baoding
- Immaculate Conception Cathedral (South Church) in Beijing
- Xishiku Cathedral (North Church) in Beijing
- Wangfujing Cathedral (St. Joseph's or East Church) in Beijing
- Cathedral of Bengbu in Bengbu
- Changsha Immaculate Conception Cathedral in Changsha
- Immaculate Conception Cathedral in Chengdu
- Chifeng Cathedral in Chifeng
- Xiwanzi Cathedral in Chongli, Zhangjiakou
- St. Joseph's Cathedral in Chongqing
- Mother of Grace Cathedral in Daming
- Cathedral of the Immaculate Heart of Mary in Datong
- Fenyang Cathedral of Fenyang
- Cathedral of St. Dominic in Fuzhou
- Sacred Heart Cathedral (Seksat Church) in Guangzhou
- St. Joseph's Cathedral, Guiyang in Guiyang
- Cathedral of the Immaculate Conception in Hangzhou
- Cathedral of St. Columban, Hanyang in Hanyang
- Cathedral of St. Michael the Archangel in Hanzhong
- Sacred Heart of Jesus Cathedral in Harbin
- Sacred Heart Cathedral in Hohhot
- Sacred Heart of Jesus Cathedral in Jilin City
- Sacred Heart Cathedral in Jinan
- Xidianzi Cathedral of the Sacred Hearts of Jesus and Mary in Jingzhou
- Cathedral of Jinzhong
- Cathedral of Our Lady of the Rosary in Ulanqab
- Sacred Heart Cathedral in Kaifeng
- Kunming Cathedral of the Sacred Heart of Jesus in Kunming
- Sacred Heart of Jesus Cathedral in Leshan
- Cathedral of the Sacred Heart in Longbao
- Cathedral of the Mother of God in Luoyang
- Cathedral of the Holy Family in Meizhou
- Nanchang Immaculate Conception Cathedral in Nanchang
- Immaculate Conception Cathedral in Nanjing
- Cathedral of Our Lady of China in Nanning
- Cathedral of the Good Shepherd in Nantong
- Our Lady of the Assumption Cathedral in Ningbo
- Sacred Heart Cathedral in Ningbo (previous diocesan seat, destroyed by fire in 2014 and restored in 2018 as major church)
- Cathedral of Pingliang
- St. Michael's Cathedral in Qingdao
- St. Michael's Cathedral in Qiqihar
- Sanyuan Sacred Heart Cathedral in Sanyuan
- St. Ignatius Cathedral (Xujiahui Church) in Shanghai
- Cathedral of the Sacred Heart of Jesus (South Church) in Shangqiu
- St. Joseph's Cathedral (Shantou) in Shantou
- Sacred Heart of Jesus Cathedral in Shenyang
- Immaculate Heart of Mary Cathedral in Shiqi
- Cathedral of Our Lady of Seven Sorrows in Suzhou
- Cathedral of the Immaculate Conception in Taiyuan
- Jiaojiang Sacred Heart Cathedral in Taizhou
- Immaculate Conception Cathedral in Tangshan
- Dongguan Cathedral in Tianshui
- St. Joseph Cathedral (Laoxikai Church) in Tianjin
- Cathedral of St. Paul in Wenzhou
- St. Joseph's Cathedral in Wuhan
- St. Joseph Cathedral in Wuhu
- Cathedral of Christ the King in Wuqiu Village
- St. Francis Cathedral in Xi’an
- Cathedral of Christ the King in Xiamen
- Dazhangzhuang Sacred Heart Cathedral in Xianxian
- Cathedral of the Angels in Xichang
- Cathedral of Weinan
- Holy Cross Cathedral in Zhangjiakou
- Sacred Heart Cathedral in Xuzhou
- Slope in the Catholic Church in Yanggu County
- Cathedral of the Holy Spirit in Yanzhou
- Cathedral of St. Francis in Yichang
- Cathedral of the Immaculate Heart of Mary in Yinchuan
- Immaculate Conception Cathedral in Shijiazhuang
- Cathedral of St. Victor in Zhanjiang
- Zhoucun Cathedral in Zhoucun
- Cathedral of the Immaculate Heart of Mary (Sanmenshizi Cathedral) in Zhouzhi

See also:

- List of cathedrals in Hong Kong § Catholicism
- Category:Roman Catholic cathedrals in Macau

== Eastern Orthodox ==
(Former) Eastern Orthodox cathedrals in China:

- Saint Sophia Cathedral in Harbin

See also:

- List of cathedrals in Hong Kong § Eastern Orthodoxy

== Anglican ==
(Former) Anglican cathedrals in China:

- Holy Saviour's Cathedral in Beijing
- Holy Trinity Cathedral in Shanghai
- St John's Cathedral in Chengdu
- St John's Cathedral in Langzhong

See also:

- List of cathedrals in Hong Kong § Anglicanism

== See also ==
- List of cathedrals
- Christianity in China
