= Sanshenggong Church =

Church building in Inner Mongolia, China

Sanshenggong Catholic Church （三盛公天主教堂）is a Catholic church located in Dengkou County in Inner Mongolia, China.

== History ==
'Sanshenggong' means 'Duke Sansheng' in Chinese. This was the business name of an oil press located in this region during the Qing dynasty and from which the site received its name.

Belgian missionary, Alphonse de Voss, came and preached in the area in 1878. He purchased part of the land used by the oil press business and had a church erected on its site, which became known as the Sanshenggong Church. The church began construction in 1888 and was finished in 1893.

In 1922, when the Roman Catholic Diocese of Ningxia was established, Sanshenggong church was made into the cathedral of the diocese. The church at the time was also associated with a convent, an orphanage, a clinic and a primary school.

It was later placed within the Apostolic Prefecture of Lindong and made into the cathedral.

The church was damaged by bombs dropped from Japanese planes in World War II and suffered further damage during the Cultural Revolution when it was used for a period as a factory. A number of structures were demolished during the course of this.

The structure was returned to the church in the 1980s and reincorporated back into the Diocese of Ningxia. The Chinese government assigned it a status of a culturally protected site and helped rebuild it.
