= Melchior Zhang Kexing =

Chinese Catholic priest and bishop (1914–1988)

- Bishop of the Roman Catholic Diocese of Xiwanzi
- Church: Cathedral in Chongli
- Archdiocese: Roman Catholic Archdiocese of Suiyuan
- Installed: 24 November 1951
- Term ended: 6 November 1988
- Predecessor: Leon-Jean-Marie De Smedt
- Successor: Andrew Hao

Orders
- Ordination: 18 March 1939

Personal details
- Born: 6 January 1914 Chahar province, China
- Died: 6 November 1988 (aged 74) Xunahua, China
- Denomination: Roman Catholic

Melchior Zhang Kexing (simplified Chinese: 张克兴; traditional Chinese: 張克興; pinyin: Zhāng Kèxīng; 6 January 1914 – 6 November 1988) was a Chinese Catholic priest and Bishop of the Roman Catholic Diocese of Xiwanzi between 1951 and 1988.

== Biography ==
Melchior Zhang Kexing was born into a wealthy family in Xiwanzi of Zhangjiakou, Chahar province, on 6 January 1914. He was ordained a priest on 18 March 1939. He became Auxiliary Bishop of the Roman Catholic Diocese of Xiwanzi on 3 November 1949. On 24 May 1951, Bishop Leon-Jean-Marie De Smedt of Belgium held a consecration ceremony for him. On 24 November 1951, Bishop Leon-Jean-Marie De Smedt died in the prison of Zhangjiakou, and Melchior Zhang Kexing took over as Bishop. The Communist government also arrested Melchior Zhang Kexing, who was sentenced to 10 years of forced labour camp for opposing the triple autonomy of the churches, which involved breaking ties with the Holy See. In 1979, still a prisoner, he was transferred to Baoding as an interpreter, which significantly improved his living conditions. In February 1985, he lived with his sister in Xuanhua District, where he died on 6 November 1988.

Catholic Church titles
Previous: Leon-Jean-Marie De Smedt	Bishop of the Roman Catholic Diocese of Xiwanzi; 1951–1988	Next: Andrew Hao
