= Francis Wang Xueming =

Chinese archbishop (1910–1997)

- Archbishop of the Roman Catholic Archdiocese of Suiyuan
- Church: Cathedral of the Sacred Heart in Hohhot
- Province: Suiyuan
- Installed: August 19, 1951
- Term ended: February 10, 1997
- Predecessor: Louis Morel
- Successor: John Baptist Wang Xixian

Orders
- Ordination: July 28, 1935

Personal details
- Born: October 4, 1910 Dalad Banner, Mongolia, Qing China
- Died: February 10, 1997 (aged 86) People's Republic of China
- Denomination: Roman Catholic

Francis Wang Xueming (simplified Chinese: 王学明; traditional Chinese: 王學明; pinyin: Wang Xueming; October 4, 1910 – February 10, 1997) was a Chinese Catholic priest and Archbishop of the Roman Catholic Archdiocese of Suiyuan between 1951 and 1997. He was a member of the 6th and 7th National Committee of the Chinese People's Political Consultative Conference.

== Biography ==
Wang was born in the town of Wang'aizhao, Dalad Banner, on October 4, 1910. He was ordained a priest on July 28, 1935.

On August 19, 1951, the Holy See appointed him as Archbishop of the Roman Catholic Archdiocese of Suiyuan to replace Louis Morel, who resigned. He was consecrated on October 7.

Wang was arrested in 1955, charged with ‘contact with foreigners’ and detained for two years; he was arrested again in 1968 and detained for six months, after which he left the church for ten years. During this time, there was pressure for Wang (and other clergy) to get married, which was against their clerical rules; there is no definite evidence that Wang ever married. He returned to his work as Archbishop in 1980. Archbishop Wang went on to join the Chinese Catholic Bishops’ College.

Wang died on February 10, 1997, aged 86.

Catholic Church titles
| Preceded by Louis Morel | Archbishop of the Roman Catholic Archdiocese of Suiyuan; 1951–1997 | Succeeded by John Baptist Wang Xixian |
