= Alfonso Bermyn =

- Bishop of the Roman Catholic Archdiocese of Suiyuan
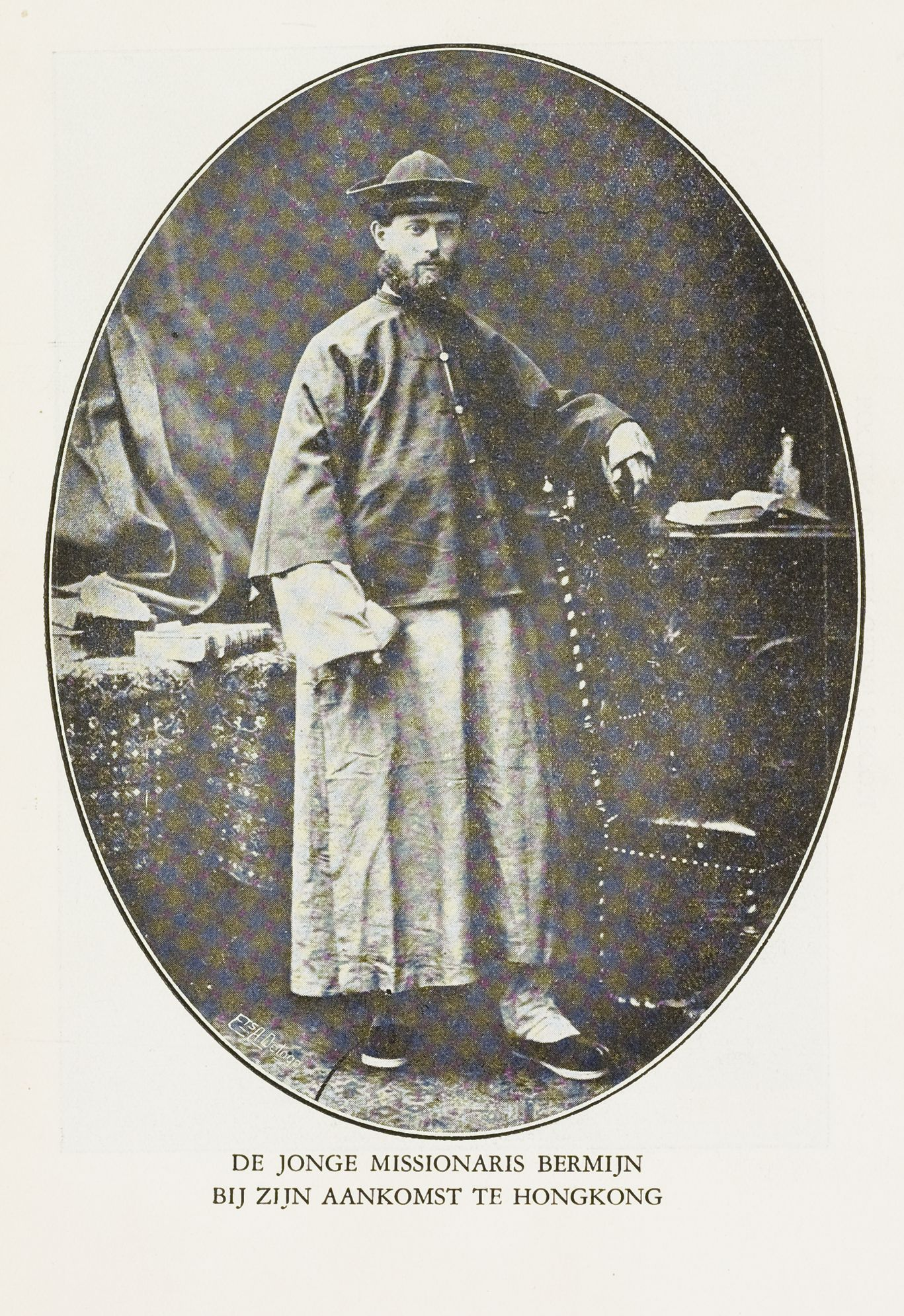
- Church: Cathedral of the Sacred Heart in Hohhot
- Province: Suiyuan
- Installed: 3 April 1901
- Term ended: 16 February 1915
- Predecessor: Ferdinand Hamer
- Successor: Louis van Dyck

Orders
- Ordination: 10 June 1876

Personal details
- Born: 3 January 1853 St. Paul de Waes, Belgium
- Died: 16 February 1915 (aged 62) Hohhot, Republic of China
- Denomination: Roman Catholic

Alfonso Bermyn (simplified Chinese: 闵玉清; traditional Chinese: 閔玉清; pinyin: Mǐn Yùqīng; 3 January 1853 – 16 February 1915) was a Belgian Catholic priest, missionary, and Bishop of the Roman Catholic Archdiocese of Suiyuan between 1901 and 1915.

== Biography ==
Alfonso Bermyn was born in Sint-Gillis-Waas, Belgium, on 3 January 1853. He was ordained a priest on 10 June 1876. He joined the CICM Missionaries on 4 March 1878. He went to Mongolia to preach in the same year. In April 1901, the Holy See appointed him as Bishop of the Roman Catholic Archdiocese of Suiyuan to replace Ferdinand Hamer, who died in the Boxer Rebellion last year. He was consecrated on 26 January 1902.

He died on 16 February 1915, aged 62.

Catholic Church titles
Preceded by Ferdinand Hamer	Bishop of the Roman Catholic Archdiocese of Suiyuan; 1901–1915	Succeeded by Louis van Dyck
