= China–Holy See relations =

China–Holy See bilateral relations

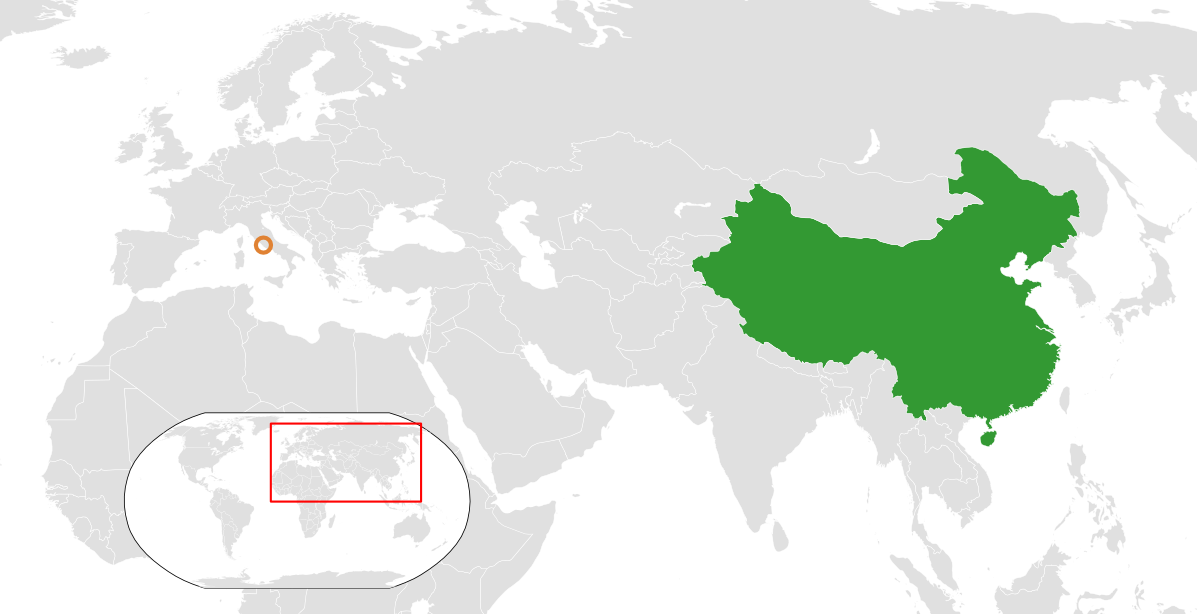
- China: Holy See

There are no official bilateral relations between the People's Republic of China (PRC) and the Holy See. The Holy See instead recognizes the Republic of China (Taiwan) since the establishment of relations with the ROC government in 1942.

Relations between the Holy See and the PRC have been strained over various issues, especially the Chinese Communist Party's (CCP) policy of restricting religious activities and the appointment of Catholic bishops in mainland China. There have been attempts to improve China–Holy See relations, with an agreement signed in September 2018 between the PRC and the Holy See allowing the pope to appoint and veto bishops approved by the CCP. The agreement was renewed for another two years in October 2020. However, in 2022, the Vatican has accused the government for violating the terms of the agreement with the appointment of a diocese not recognised by the Holy See.

== Framework ==
The Beijing government has set two conditions for re-establishing relations: that the Holy See "not interfere in religious matters in China" and that, in line with Beijing's One China principle, it break the ties with the Taipei government. Such ties were established after the expulsion of Archbishop Riberi, and have been maintained at the level of chargé d'affaires ever since the United Nations' recognition of the Beijing government as the government of China. The Holy See has indicated that it would move its nunciature to Beijing only with guarantees of religious freedom.

A recurring issue is the procedure for appointing Catholic bishops in mainland China. This is the most important issue in the bilateral relationship from the perspective of the Vatican. Since the 1950s, the Chinese government's position is that bishops in China should be elected by Chinese Catholics through the Chinese Catholic Patriotic Association. The Chinese Catholic Patriotic Association is part of the CCP's united front system. Through this process, the CCP has ultimate control over the appointment of bishops. The Vatican's position is that the appointment of bishops is the prerogative of the pope. By the terms of the canon law of the Catholic Church, the Chinese bishops and people who actively participate in their ordination would be automatically excommunicated, a result called latae sententiae. The Vatican has never announced any such excommunications. Instead, the Vatican describes the ordination of the Chinese bishops as valid but illicit. This means that in the Vatican's view, the Chinese bishops are in fact bishops, but the process through which they are appointed is sinful. In 2018, the Chinese government and the Holy See reached a provisional agreement on the appointment of bishops, which was renewed in 2022 and 2024.

== History ==
During the Chinese Civil War, Pope Pius XII forbade Chinese Catholics from joining the CCP or participating in its activities.

In summer 1949, the CCP forces captured the Nationalist capital, Nanjing. The Nationalist government retreated to Guangzhou. Although most of the diplomatic corps in Nanjing also went to Guangzhou, the papal ambassador (the Internuncio) remained in Nanjing. Pius XII instructed all Chinese bishops to remain in place. Veteran religious personnel were also encouraged to remain in place but seminarians were encouraged to leave and continue their studies in environments deemed more politically stable.

In 1950, the Holy See stated that participation in certain CCP-related organizations would result in excommunication from the Church. In response, initiatives including Fr. Wang Liangzuo's "Guangyuan Declaration of Catholic Self-Reformation" gained support from Chinese Catholics. In turn, apostolic nuncio Antonio Riberi circulated a letter denouncing such proposed reforms, and in March 1951 Fr. Li Weiguang and a group of 783 priests, nuns, and lay Catholics signed a declaration opposing what they viewed as Vatican interference and Western imperialism. Throughout 1950 and 1951, the People's Republic of China put pressure on the Vatican by threatening a breakaway of "independent Catholics", but many priests opposed the movement, and Premier Zhou Enlai sought a middle ground. A deadly controversy was then manufactured: a priest working at the Holy See internunciature (legation) had thrown out an old 1930s-era mortar in a trash pile out of his home. A businessman named Antonio Riva discovered the mortar and took a non-functioning piece of it back to his house to display as an antique. When CCP officials saw Riva's curio in his home, they arrested him for conspiracy to assassinate Chairman of the Chinese Communist Party Mao Zedong, which Riva denied. Riva was executed and the Holy See's diplomatic mission was banished from the country for "espionage". Tarcisio Martina, the regional apostolic prefect, was sentenced to life in prison and died in 1961, while four other "conspirators" were given shorter sentences.

The PRC broke off diplomatic relations with the Holy See in 1951, deporting the apostolic nuncio to British Hong Kong. The CCP framed these actions in terms of Chinese Catholics reclaiming their church in the context of broader opposition to Western imperialism. Pope Paul VI visited Hong Kong, making a three-hour stop on December 4, 1970, during his Asian tour.

The Catholic Church in China developed into two communities. The "Patriotic" Church operates with approval of Chinese authorities and the "Underground" Church which professes loyalty to the Pope. "Underground" does not mean the underground church is secret (the community mostly operates openly) but refers to its lack of official approval and lack of official support.

After the Cuban missile crisis demonstrated the risk of nuclear war, The Holy See became convinced that it had been too reluctant to engage with the Eastern Bloc countries. Through its foreign relations approach of Ostpolitik, the Vatican downplayed the role of ideological conflicts in international relations and reduced its anti-communist rhetoric. The Vatican also sought to use this approach to make the sacraments and church public life more available in the communist countries.

=== Papacy of John Paul II ===
In 1978, the Vatican permitted the underground church to ordain new bishops without Vatican approval (Vatican approval is normally required for ordination). In 1989, the underground church organized a bishop's conference. Shortly thereafter, the Chinese Catholic Patriotic Association established a bishop's conference. The Vatican recognizes neither.

In the 1980s, the Congregation of the Evangelization of Peoples was a major Vatican body dealing with Chinese-related issues.

On 18 February 1981, Pope John Paul II met with overseas Chinese in the Philippines on his first trip to Asia. Signaling a desire to improve relations with the PRC, John Paul II delivered a speech in which he stated that "the Christian message is not the exclusive property of any one group or race; it is addressed to everyone and belongs to everyone. There is therefore no opposition or incompatibility in being at the same time truly Christian and authentically Chinese."

On 6 January 1982, John Paul II sent a letter to Catholic bishops, asking them to pray for the Catholic Church in China and comparing the experience of Chinese Catholics to the early Christians. This offended the Chinese government, which resented the criticism of the state of religious freedom in China.

In 1984, the Vatican yearbook dropped the titles of foreign missionaries who had been archbishops and bishops in China. Academic Paul P. Mariani writes that by "signaling that it no longer was operating under the fiction that those missionaries still spoke for the dioceses in which they had not set foot during the previous decades," the Vatican cleared the stage for the possible appointment of new bishops in China.

On 1 October 2000, John Paul II recognized 120 Chinese Catholics killed during the 19th century and the Boxer Rebellion as martyrs. In the view of the PRC, these Catholics had served the interests of foreign imperialism. With John Paul II's announcement occurring on China's National Day, the government viewed the move by the Vatican as offensive and protested to the Vatican.

Approximately one year later, John Paul II sent a message to a conference commemorating Matteo Ricci's arrival in Beijing. John Paul II wrote that he regretted the behavior of those who "may have given the impression of a lack of respect and esteem for the Chinese people on the part of the Catholic Church". John Paul II asked for "forgiveness and understanding of those who may have felt hurt in such actions on the part of Christians". In China, these remarks were interpreted as the first apology by an imperialist power for its historical actions in China. The Chinese government also interpreted the remarks as indicating that the Vatican wished to improve relations.

In Spring 2005, ROC President Chen Shui-bian attended the funeral of Pope John Paul II. According to academic Peter Moody, Chen apparently attended on his own initiative, not the Vatican's invitation. The PRC protested Chen's attendance, describing it as "an opportunity to engage in secessionist activity".

=== 2007 letter to Chinese Catholics ===
The Holy See made efforts in 2007 to create formal ties with the PRC. Theodore McCarrick had been an envoy as part of such efforts. High-ranking bishops in the Roman Catholic Church implied that such a diplomatic move was possible, predicated on the PRC granting more freedom of religion and interfering less in the hierarchy of the church in mainland China.

In May 2007, Pope Benedict XVI wrote an open letter to all Chinese Catholics, stating that there was one Catholic Church in China, and that despite the two communities (i.e. the "Patriotic" and "Underground" Churches) there was no schism between them. Benedict XVI stated that sacraments performed by the priests not in unity with the Vatican were valid but also illicit. He stated that the Catholic Church accepts the legitimacy of the civil authorities in secular matters and that the Pope has authority in ecclesial matters, and therefore the involvement of the Chinese Catholic Patriotic Association in the appointment of bishops (and its bishops conference) violated Catholic doctrine. The letter also removed the permission granted by the Vatican in 1978 to the Underground church to appoint bishops without Vatican approval.

In September 2007, the appointment of Father Joseph Li Shan by the PRC authorities was said to be "tacitly approved" by the Vatican. In May 2008, the China Philharmonic Orchestra from mainland China performed a concert for the Pope inside the Vatican, prompting analysts to speak of a "growing rapprochement" between the two countries. On 8 April 2011, the Financial Times reported that Baron Von Pfetten organized the first major breakthrough discussion at leadership level during a three days closed door seminar in his French château where a senior Chinese visiting delegation met with Monseigneur Balestrero the Holy See Undersecretary for Relations with States.

=== Papacy of Francis ===
In March 2013, ROC President Ma Ying-jeou attended the inauguration of Pope Francis. The PRC protested and, according to academic Peter Moody, apparently boycotted the event. The Vatican stated that no specific invitations had been sent to any country and that "No one is privileged, no one is refused, everyone is welcome if they say they are coming".

Francis said in a 2015 news media interview that he wished to visit China and improve the China–Holy See relationship. It was reported that on a papal visit to South Korea in August 2014 China opened its airspace to the Pope's plane, and while crossing Chinese airspace the Pope sent a telegram expressing his "best wishes" to the Chinese people.

Upon the death of Pope Francis in April 2025, the website for the Chinese Catholic Patriotic Association had a notice of his death for only four days before removing it, and police in Wenzhou prevented priests from celebrating mass in memory of the late pope.

=== 2018 Holy See–China agreement ===
In January 2018, the Church was close to negotiating a deal with China that allowed China to have more control over the underground churches and allowed the Vatican to have more control over the appointment of bishops. While this did not amount to the establishment of formal diplomatic ties, this was seen as a huge step towards formal recognition. However, Cardinal Joseph Zen Ze-kiun, the former Bishop of Hong Kong, dubbed the warming of diplomatic relationships as selling out the Catholic Church in China, as the process involves the resignation of several bishops of the underground church. A vigil was held by the Justice and Peace Commission of the Hong Kong Catholic Diocese in response from 12 to 13 February in St Bonaventure Church.

The Holy See's Secretariat of State was in charge of negotiations for the Holy See side.

On 22 September 2018, the Chinese government and the Vatican signed a historic agreement concerning the appointment of bishops in China. Described by the parties as a "provisional agreement", the agreement's text has not been disclosed. China's foreign ministry said that the agreement works to maintain communications and improve relations between the parties. They did not establish diplomatic relations, and the Vatican maintained diplomatic ties with the Republic of China on Taiwan. Vatican spokesman Greg Burke described the agreement as "not political but pastoral, allowing the faithful to have bishops who are in communion with Rome but at the same time recognized by Chinese authorities." The agreement states that China will recommend bishops before they are appointed by the pope, and stipulates that the pope has authority to veto a bishop China recommends.

Francis then approved seven bishops who had been appointed by Beijing, after withdrawing Church censures against those six and one recently deceased bishop, who had all received episcopal consecration without papal approval. Francis also dismissed one of the Underground Church bishops and demoted another.

On 23 September, the Catholic Church in China pledged to remain loyal to the Chinese Communist Party (CCP). On 26 September, in a letter to Chinese Catholics, Pope Francis wrote:

On the civil and political level, Chinese Catholics must be good citizens, loving their homeland and serving their country with diligence and honesty, to the best of their ability. On the ethical level, they should be aware that many of their fellow citizens expect from them a greater commitment to the service of the common good and the harmonious growth of society as a whole. In particular, Catholics ought to make a prophetic and constructive contribution born of their faith in the kingdom of God. At times, this may also require of them the effort to offer a word of criticism, not out of sterile opposition, but for the sake of building a society that is more just, humane and respectful of the dignity of each person.

According to Willy Wo-Lap Lam, the agreement reflects the long-standing desire of the Chinese government to end the Holy See's recognition of the government in Taiwan, even as CCP general secretary Xi Jinping continued the campaign, launched in the spring of 2018, to increase control of foreign religious institutions. In October 2018, local Chinese government officials destroyed two Marian shrines, one in Shanxi and one in Guizhou.

While some have raised concerns that China was no longer enforcing the terms of the 2018 agreement, both parties extended the agreement in October 2020 for two more years. As of July 2022, seven bishops before 2018 were brought into communion with the Vatican and only six new bishops had been appointed under the 2018 agreement. In October 2022, the agreement was renewed for another two years. In November 2022, the Vatican accused the Chinese government of violating the terms of the agreement. A bishop of another district, Giovanni Peng Weizhao, was installed as auxiliary bishop in Jiangxi, which is not recognized as a diocese by the Vatican. In April 2023, Bishop Shen Bin, formerly Bishop of Haimen, was installed in the Diocese of Shanghai, with the Vatican learning of the appointment only a few days before.

In October 2024, the agreement was renewed for another four years.

During the sede vacante period following Pope Francis' death in April 2025, the Diocese of Xinxiang "elected" Fr. Li Janlin as bishop. Since a new pope had not yet been elected, it was impossible for the Holy See to recognize or ratify the appointment.

After Leo XIV was elected pope, he nominated Joseph Lin Yuntuan as auxiliary bishop of Fuzhou on 5 June 2025 in accordance with the agreement. The nomination was approved by Chinese authorities on 11 June. Later on 10 September, he approved the reorganisation of the Diocese of Xuanhua and Diocese of Xiwanzi into the Diocese of Zhangjiakou, appointing Joseph Wang Zhengui as the first bishop both recognised by Vatican and Beijing of the new diocese. The final bishop of Xiwanzi Joseph Ma Yan'en is translated to the new diocese and appointed as auxiliary bishop.

Chinese Catholics in the CCPA generally view the agreement positively, on the rationale that they are in full communion with the Vatican as a result. The provisional agreement resulted in a decline of the "underground" church, because Francis's emphasis on unity and urging to join the official church removes the logic for the "underground" church's existence.

== See also ==
- Chinese Regional Bishops' Conference of Taiwan
- Roman Catholicism in China
- Pope Pius XII and China
- Religion in China

== Audio ==
- Is Pope Francis ‘betraying’ China’s Catholics? The Inquiry. BBC World Service. 23 min. 22 August 2024 (radio documentary on the 2018 agreement).
