= Du Jiang =

Du Jiang, may refer to:

- Du Jiang (actor), Chinese actor
- Du Jiang (politician), Deputy Minister of Culture and Tourism
- Matthias Du Jiang, a Chinese Catholic priest and Bishop of the Apostolic Prefecture of Lindong
