= Joseph Li Jing =

- Bishop of the Roman Catholic Diocese of Ningxia
- Church: Cathedral of the Immaculate Heart of Mary in Yinchuan
- Archdiocese: Roman Catholic Archdiocese of Suiyuan
- Diocese: Roman Catholic Diocese of Ningxia
- Installed: 20 December 2009
- Predecessor: John Baptist Liu Jingshan

Orders
- Ordination: August 8, 1996

Personal details
- Born: November 15, 1968 (age 57) Bayannur, Inner Mongolia
- Denomination: Roman Catholic
- Coat of arms

Joseph Li Jing (Chinese: 李晶; pinyin: Lǐ Jīng; born 15 November 1968) is a Chinese Catholic priest and Bishop of the Roman Catholic Diocese of Ningxia since December 20, 2009.

== Biography ==
Li was born on November 15, 1968, in Bayannur, Inner Mongolia, but originally from a Muslim family in Ningxia. He studied at an institute in Beijing since 1985. In 1994 he pursued advanced studies in Germany and returned to China in 1998. He was ordained a priest on August 8, 1996. After returning to China he worked at the National Priest Conference in Beijing. In 2005, he came to the Roman Catholic Diocese of Ningxia. On December 20, 2009, John Baptist Liu Jingshan resigned at the age of 95, Li officially succeeded as Bishop there. His appointment was approved by the Holy See.

Catholic Church titles
Previous: John Baptist Liu Jingshan	Bishop of the Roman Catholic Diocese of Ningxia; 2009	Incumbent
