= Evarist Zhang Zhiliang =

- Vicar Apostolic of Jining
- Church: Cathedral of Our Lady of the Rosary in Ulanqab, Inner Mongolia
- Province: Roman Catholic Archdiocese of Suiyuan
- Diocese: Roman Catholic Diocese of Jining
- Installed: February 2, 1929
- Term ended: May 26, 1932
- Predecessor: New title
- Successor: Joseph Fan Heng'an

Orders
- Ordination: December 28, 1917

Personal details
- Born: March 15, 1887 Qing China
- Died: May 26, 1932 (aged 45) Ulanqab, Republic of China
- Denomination: Roman Catholic

Evarist Zhang Zhiliang (simplified Chinese: 张智良; traditional Chinese: 張智良; pinyin: Zhāng Zhìliáng; March 15, 1887 – May 26, 1932) was a Chinese Catholic priest and Vicar Apostolic of Jining between 1929 and 1932.

== Biography ==
Evarist Zhang Zhiliang was born on March 15, 1887. He was ordained a priest on December 28, 1917. On February 2, 1929, Pope Pius XI appointed him Vicar Apostolic of Jining. On April 14 of that year he was consecrated in St. Peter's Basilica, Rome, by Willem Marinus van Rossum.

On May 26, 1932, he died in Jining, aged 45.

Catholic Church titles
New title	Vicar Apostolic of Jining; 1929–1932	Succeeded by Joseph Fan Heng'an
