= Paul Meng =

Paul Meng may refer to:

- Paul Meng Qinglu (born 1962), Chinese Roman Catholic bishop in Inner Mongolia
- Paul Meng Zhuyou (born 1963), Chinese Roman Catholic bishop in Taiyuan
