= Joseph Fan =

Joseph Fan may refer to:

- Joseph Fan Heng'an (1882–1962), Chinese Roman Catholic bishop in Jining (Inner Mongolia)
- Joseph Fan Zhongliang (1918–2014), Chinese Roman Catholic bishop in Shanghai

== See also ==
- Peter Joseph Fan Xueyan (1907–1992), Chinese Roman Catholic bishop in Baoding
