= Diocese of Zhangjiakou =

Latin Catholic diocese in China

Diocese of Zhangjiakou 张家口教区
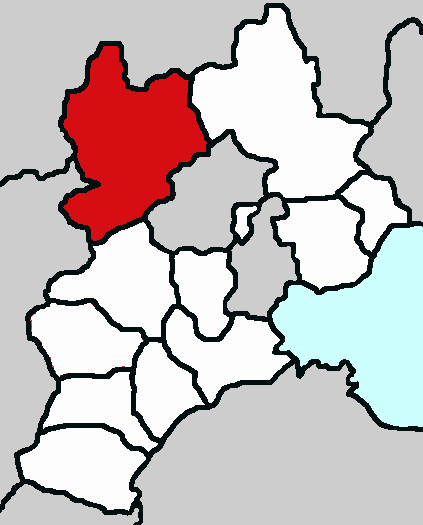
- Zhangjiakou city of Hebei province, China

Location
- Country: China
- Territory: Northwestern Hebei
- Ecclesiastical province: Beijing

Statistics
- Population: Total; Catholics: (as of 2025); 4,000,000; 85,000

Information
- Denomination: Catholic Church
- Sui iuris church: Latin Church
- Rite: Roman Rite
- Established: 1980 (not recognized by Vatican); 10 September 2025 (canonically established)
- Cathedral: Cathedral of the Holy Family, Zhangjiakou
- Secular priests: 89 (as of 2025)

Current leadership
- Pope: Leo XIV
- Bishop: Joseph Wang Zhengui
- Metropolitan Archbishop: Joseph Li Shan
- Auxiliary Bishops: Joseph Ma Yanen

The Diocese of Zhangjiakou is a religious jurisdiction of the Catholic Church in the province of Hebei, China. It is a diocese of the Latin Church and its episcopal see is the city of Zhangjiakou in northwestern Hebei. It was created on 10 September 2025 by Pope Leo XIV, coinciding with the disestablishment of the Diocese of Xuanhua and the Diocese of Xiwanzi, as well as the consecration of Zhangjiakou's first bishop, Joseph Wang Zhengui. It is in the ecclesiastical province of the Archdiocese of Beijing.

Following the proclamation of the People's Republic of China, the underground church – comprising Catholics opposed to the ruling Chinese Communist Party and its affiliated Chinese Catholic Patriotic Association (CCPA) – maintained the Diocese of Xuanhua and the Diocese of Xiwanzi. The CCPA also operated its own jurisdiction in the territory, the Diocese of Zhangjiakou, which was not recognized as canonical by the Vatican. In 2018, an agreement between the Chinese government and Vatican set up a system for the appointment of bishops approved by both parties. Leo XIV's announcement, which suppressed the sees at Xuanhua and Xiwanzi while also erecting a canonical Diocese of Zhangjiakou, was the first time under Leo XIV that diocesan borders were redrawn to match Chinese civil boundaries and the first time such a reorganization was mutually agreed upon between the Vatican and Chinese government. Wang was consecrated following approval under the 2018 agreement's framework.

== History ==
Since the 1949 proclamation of the People's Republic of China, the province of Hebei, China, has been a region of tension between the underground church that comprises Catholics not aligned with the Chinese Communist Party and the Chinese state-affiliated Chinese Patriotic Catholic Association (CCPA), which legally administers Catholics in the country. The underground church would coordinate with the Vatican, operating an ecclesiastical hierarchy with diocesan boundaries largely drawn prior to 1949, while a parallel state-recognized CCPA hierarchy operated jurisdictions following present civil boundaries. Some of the CCPA dioceses operate without canonical approval within the Catholic Church.

In Hebei, the Diocese of Xuanhua and the Diocese of Xiwanzi were both established by Pope Pius XII on 11 April 1946. Both dioceses operated as part of the underground church, with clergy facing detention. Among these were Bishop of Xuanhua Augustine Cui Tai, who has been repeatedly detained since 2007, as well as ordered to house arrest and forced labor. Placidus Pei Ronggui, a former coadjutor bishop of the Diocese of Luoyang, had been a hero of the underground church and was held in prison for four years in the 1980s for his refusal to join the CCPA. He had retired to Hebei in 2011. Pei died the week prior to the announcement reorganizing the church in Hebei. Starting in 1980, the CCPA also maintained its own diocese, known as the Diocese of Zhangjiakou, corresponding with the territories of the canonical dioceses of Xuanhua and Xiwanzi.

The Chinese government and Vatican signed an agreement in 2018 that would allow for the appointment of bishops approved by both parties so that episcopal vacancies could be filled, though the details of the agreement are not public. Following the agreement, Cui Tai was detained four times and, according to the Hudson Institute in 2024, had not been seen since being taken into police custody in April 2021. Pope Francis renewed the 2018 agreement in October 2024.

In July 2025, Pope Leo XIV decided to suppress the Diocese of Xuanhua and the Diocese of Xiwanzi. The suppression was announced on 10 September alongside the erection of the Diocese of Zhangjiakou. While some of the territory of the suppressed dioceses was incorporated into the Archdiocese of Beijing and Diocese of Jining, most of their territory became part of the Diocese of Zhangjiakou. The formal establishment of the Diocese of Zhangjiakou to replace the two suppressed dioceses aligned the Vatican with the CCPA in Hebei and was the first time Leo XIV had altered diocesan boundaries to conform with Chinese civil jurisdictions. It was also the first time dioceses were reorganized with mutual agreement between the Chinese government and Vatican. The new diocese became part of the ecclesiastical province of the Archdiocese of Beijing.

The 10 September announcement of the Vatican-recognized Diocese of Zhangjiakou's erection coincided with the episcopal consecration of Joseph Wang Zhengui as the first bishop of Zhangjiakou early that day. Wang, who had been selected through the 2018 agreement's framework, was consecrated in the Church of the Holy Family in Zhangjiakou during a Mass attended by approximately 300 Catholics, 50 clergy, and senior officials from the CCPA. With the announcement, Bishop of Xiwanzi Joseph Ma Yanen was assigned as an auxiliary bishop of the Diocese of Zhangjiakou. Ma Yanen was installed in that position on 12 September, with the archbishop of Beijing and president of the CCPA Joseph Li Shan presiding. The announcement did not mention Cui Tai, who was then at the episcopal retirement age of 75 years old, though AsiaNews reported that clergy had been informed that a retirement ceremony for Cui Tai would be held on 12 September.

== Composition ==
The territory of the Diocese of Zhangjiakou is within the civil province of Hebei, with its episcopal see as the city of Zhangjiakou in the northwestern portion of the province. The diocese's territory comprises the majority of the territory formerly part of the Diocese of Xuanhua and the Diocese of Xiwanzi. As of 2025, about four million people resided with the Diocese of Zhangjiakou's territory, including about 85,000 Catholics. At the time of the diocese's erection, it had 89 priests. The diocese is a suffragan within the ecclesiastical province of the metropolitan Archdiocese of Beijing.
