= Joseph Ma Zhongmu =

Chinese bishop (1919–2020)

- Bishop of Diocese of Ninghsia
- Province: Mongolia
- Diocese: Ninghsia
- Installed: 8 November 1983
- Term ended: 2005
- Predecessor: Charles Joseph van Melckebeke
- Successor: John Baptist Liu Jingshan

Orders
- Ordination: 31 July 1947 by Charles Joseph van Melckebeke
- Consecration: 8 November 1983 by Casimir Wang Mi-lu

Personal details
- Born: Aktaqin Tegusbeleg; 1 November 1919 Sueiyuan Province, China
- Died: 25 March 2020 (aged 100) Inner Mongolia, China

Joseph Ma Zhongmu (1 November 1919 – 25 March 2020) was a Chinese Roman Catholic bishop.

== Biography ==
Ma Zhongmu was born in China and was ordained to the priesthood in 1947. He served as bishop of the Roman Catholic Diocese of Ningxia, China, from 1983 to 2005. Ma Zhongmu was clandestinely ordained a bishop.

He was interred in a forced labor camp from 1958 to 1969 for his refusal to support the Catholic Patriotic Association. He was the only bishop of Mongolian ethnicity and translated the Roman Catholic Missal into his native language, but it was never approved by the Holy See. His Mongolian name is Aktaqin Tegusbeleg.
