= Anthony Yao Shun =

Chinese bishop (born 1965)

Antonio Yao Shun
- Bishop of the Roman Catholic Diocese of Jining
- Church: Cathedral of Our Lady of the Rosary in Ulanqab
- Province: Suiyuan
- Diocese: Roman Catholic Diocese of Jining
- Installed: 26 August 2019
- Predecessor: John Liu Shi-gong

Orders
- Ordination: 1991

Personal details
- Born: 1965 (age 60–61) Ulanqab, Inner Mongolia, China
- Denomination: Roman Catholic
- Education: National Seminary of Catholic Church in China; St. John's University
- Coat of arms: Antonio Yao Shun's coat of arms

Antonio Yao Shun (simplified Chinese: 姚顺; traditional Chinese: 姚順; pinyin: Yáo Shùn; born 1965) is a Chinese Catholic bishop, and Bishop of the Roman Catholic Diocese of Jining since 2019. Yao is the first Chinese bishop appointed by Pope Francis after the signing of the Sino-Vatican Provisional Agreement.

== Biography ==
Yao was born in 1965 in Ulanqab, Inner Mongolia, China. In 1991 he graduated from the National Seminary of Catholic Church in China. He was ordained a priest at that same year. He pursued advanced studies in the United States, earning master's degree of church etiquette from St. John's University. He took part in short-term training at the school of rites of Paul VI in the Philippines. After returning to China he taught at the National Seminary of Catholic Church in China. In 2010 he became vicar general of Bishop John Liu Shi-gong in the Roman Catholic Diocese of Jining. In August 2019 he became Bishop of the Roman Catholic Diocese of Jining.

Catholic Church titles
Previous: John Liu Shi-gong	Bishop of the Roman Catholic Diocese of Jining; 2019	Incumbent
