= John Liu Shi-gong =

Chinese Catholic bishop

- Bishop of Jining
- Native name: 劉世功
- Church: Catholic Church
- Diocese: Diocese of Jining
- In office: 12 October 1995 – 9 June 2017
- Predecessor: Joseph Fan Heng'an
- Successor: Anthony Yao Shun

Orders
- Ordination: 15 August 1956
- Consecration: 12 October 1995 by John Baptist Liu Jingshan

Personal details
- Born: 18 August 1928 Ulan Hua Town, Dorbod Banner, Suiyuan, Republic of China
- Died: 9 June 2017 (aged 88)

John Liu Shi-gong (Chinese: 劉世功; 18 August 1928 – 9 June 2017) was a Chinese Catholic bishop.

Ordained to the priesthood in 1956, Liu Shi-gong served as bishop of the Roman Catholic Diocese of Jining, China, from 1995 until his death in 2017.

He was succeeded by Bishop Anthony Yao Shun.

Catholic Church titles
| Previous: Joseph Fan Heng'an, then Administrator Father Ai Shijun | Bishop of the Roman Catholic Diocese of Jining; 1995–2017 | Next: Anthony Yao Shun |
