= Matthias Du Jiang =

- Bishop of the Apostolic Prefecture of Lindong
- Church: Catholic Church of Shaanba Town
- Diocese: Apostolic Prefecture of Lindong
- Installed: 2004
- Predecessor: Francis Xavier Guo Zhengji

Orders
- Ordination: 1989

Personal details
- Born: November 20, 1963 (age 62) Qahar Right Rear Banner, Inner Mongolia, China
- Denomination: Roman Catholic
- Education: Inner Mongolia Seminary
- Coat of arms

Matthias Du Jiang (Chinese: 杜江; pinyin: Dù Jiāng; born 20 November 1963) is a Chinese Catholic priest and Bishop of the Apostolic Prefecture of Lindong since 2004.

== Biography ==
Du was born in Qahar Right Rear Banner, Inner Mongolia, China, on November 20, 1963, to a Catholic family. In 1985 he entered the Inner Mongolia Seminary. He was ordained a priest in 1989. He became parish priest in the church in Sanshenggong in 1997, and was Bameng's general vicar in 2000. He was "secretly" ordained bishop on May 7, 2004, succeeding Bishop Francis Xavier Guo Zhengji, who died four days before on May 3. He was openly in office on April 8, 2010, six years after the Communist government signaled that they accepted his status as bishop.

Catholic Church titles
Previous: Francis Xavier Guo Zhengji	Bishop of the Apostolic Prefecture of Lindong; 2004	Incumbent
