= Ferdinand Hamer =

Dutch missionary and bishop (1840–1900)

Ferdinandus Hubertus Hamer C.I.C.M.
- Vicar Apostolic of Southwestern Mongolia
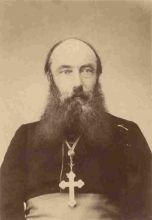
- Church: Catholic Church
- See: Apostolic Vicariate of Southwestern Mongolia
- In office: 15 February 1889 – 23 July 1900
- Predecessor: Alphonse de Voss
- Successor: Alfonso Bermyn
- Other post: Titular Bishop of Tremithus (1878-1900)
- Previous post: Vicar Apostolic of Kansu (1878-1889)

Orders
- Ordination: 10 August 1864 by Andreas Ignatius Schaepman
- Consecration: 27 October 1878 by Jacques Bax

Personal details
- Born: 21 August 1840 Nijmegen, Gelderland, Kingdom of the Netherlands
- Died: 23 July 1900 (aged 59) Togtoh County, Inner Mongolia, Great Qing

Ferdinandus Hubertus Hamer C.I.C.M. (born 21 August 1840 in Nijmegen, Netherlands, died 23 July 1900 in To Tsjeng, Inner Mongolia, China) was a Catholic missionary to China and bishop who was killed in the Boxer Rebellion in China.

== Biography ==
Father Ferdinand Hamer was one of the first group of five missionary priests and brother from the congregation of Congregatio Immaculati Cordis Mariae who went to Inner Mongolia in China from Belgium in 1865. His three colleagues, among them the congregation's leader, Father Theophiel Verbist, died quickly, and then Father Hamer was left to return alone, although he had some lay workers to help him.

Later, he became better with the language and the missionary work. In 1878, he was the first bishop to have responsibility for the apostolic vicariate of Gansu. In 1889 he was sent by the Pope to the apostolic vicariate of Southwest-Mongolia. Although he had problems again with language, the Chinese noted his extraordinary helpfulness and devotion.

In 1899, he was caught up in the anti-Christian Boxer Rebellion. In July and August 1900 the Boxers reached the area where Bishop Hamer was working. The Boxers took him to jail on 19 July, and four days later they subjected him to beatings, mockery, questioning, and torture. His nose, fingers and ears were cut off and all of his hair pulled out. That same day, 23 July, he was killed; three sticks were put together into a tripod, and an iron hook was placed at the top. The bishop was stripped and wrapped in a cotton cloth, and dunked in oil. He was then hanged by his feet from the hook with his head hanging down. The cloth was then set on fire. A loud scream was heard, and he died.

== Veneration ==
A cause for Hamer's beatification was opened, and along with a number of companions he was declared a Servant of God. Theologians approved his spiritual writings on 7 January 1951.
