= Sacred Heart Cathedral, Hohhot =

- 呼和浩特耶稣圣心主教座堂
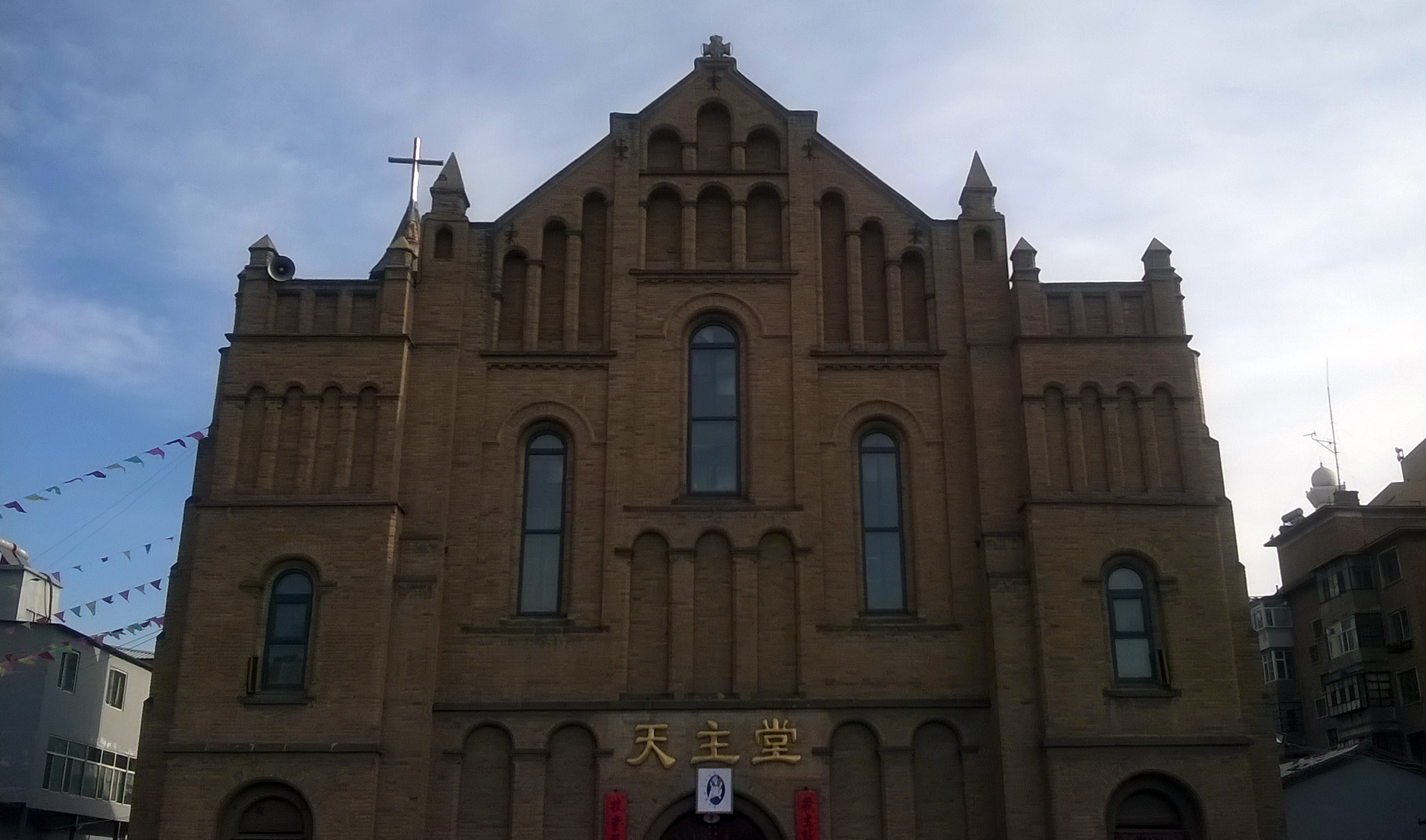
- Front façade of the cathedral in 2016
- Sacred Heart Cathedral, Hohhot
- 40.8107°N 111.6475°E
- Location: Tongdao St, Huimin District, Hohhot
- Country: China
- Denomination: Catholic

History
- Founded: 1924
- Dedication: Most Sacred Heart of Jesus

Architecture
- Style: Gothic Revival and Romanesque Revival
- Completed: 1924
- Construction cost: 50,000 silver pieces

Administration
- Archdiocese: Roman Catholic Archdiocese of Suiyuan

The Sacred Heart Cathedral is a Catholic cathedral in Hohhot, Inner Mongolia, China. It is the seat of the bishop of the Roman Catholic Archdiocese of Suiyuan. (Note: Under the 1980 Chinese Catholic Patriotic Association districting, Hohhot is the seat of the Roman Catholic Diocese of Hohhot.) The construction of the cathedral began in 1922 and it became the cathedral of the diocese in 1924. Currently, it is a Major Cultural Heritage Site under National-Level Protection in China.

== History ==
In 1865, the Congregation of the Immaculate Heart of Mary assumed the missions in Inner Mongolia from the Vincentians. They founded the first Catholic church in Hohhot, Shuang'ai Tang (双爱堂). It was destroyed in 1900 during the Boxer Rebellion.

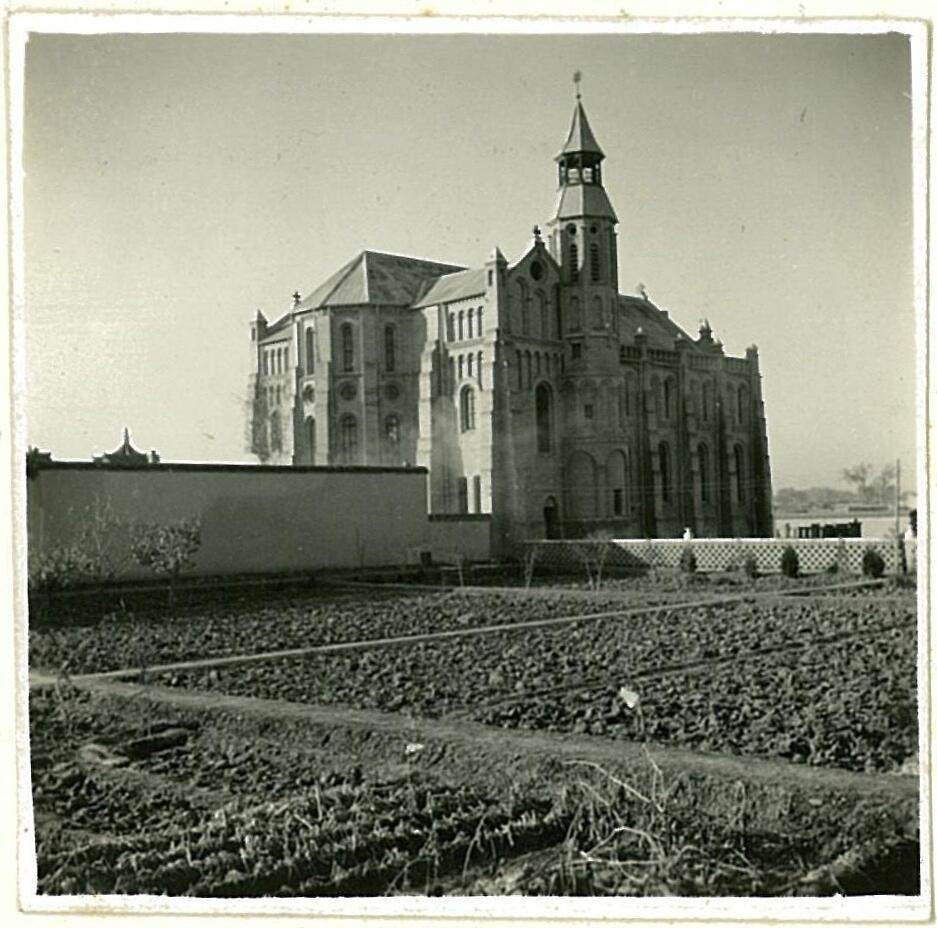
The cathedral photographed by the North China Transportation Company in 1939 during the Second Sino-Japanese War

In 1922, the Catholic church established the Apostolic Vicariate of Suiyuan. The construction of the Sacred Heart Cathedral began in the same year. In 1924, the bishop's seat was moved from Ershisiqingdi to the current cathedral. The construction cost 50,000 silver pieces. In 1938, the body of Louis van Dyck, former bishop of Suiyuan, was reburied at the cathedral.

During the Cultural Revolution, the cathedral was used as a warehouse because of its size and stability. It was returned to Catholic use after 1980. In 2013, it was listed as a Major Cultural Heritage Site under National-Level Protection.

== Architecture ==
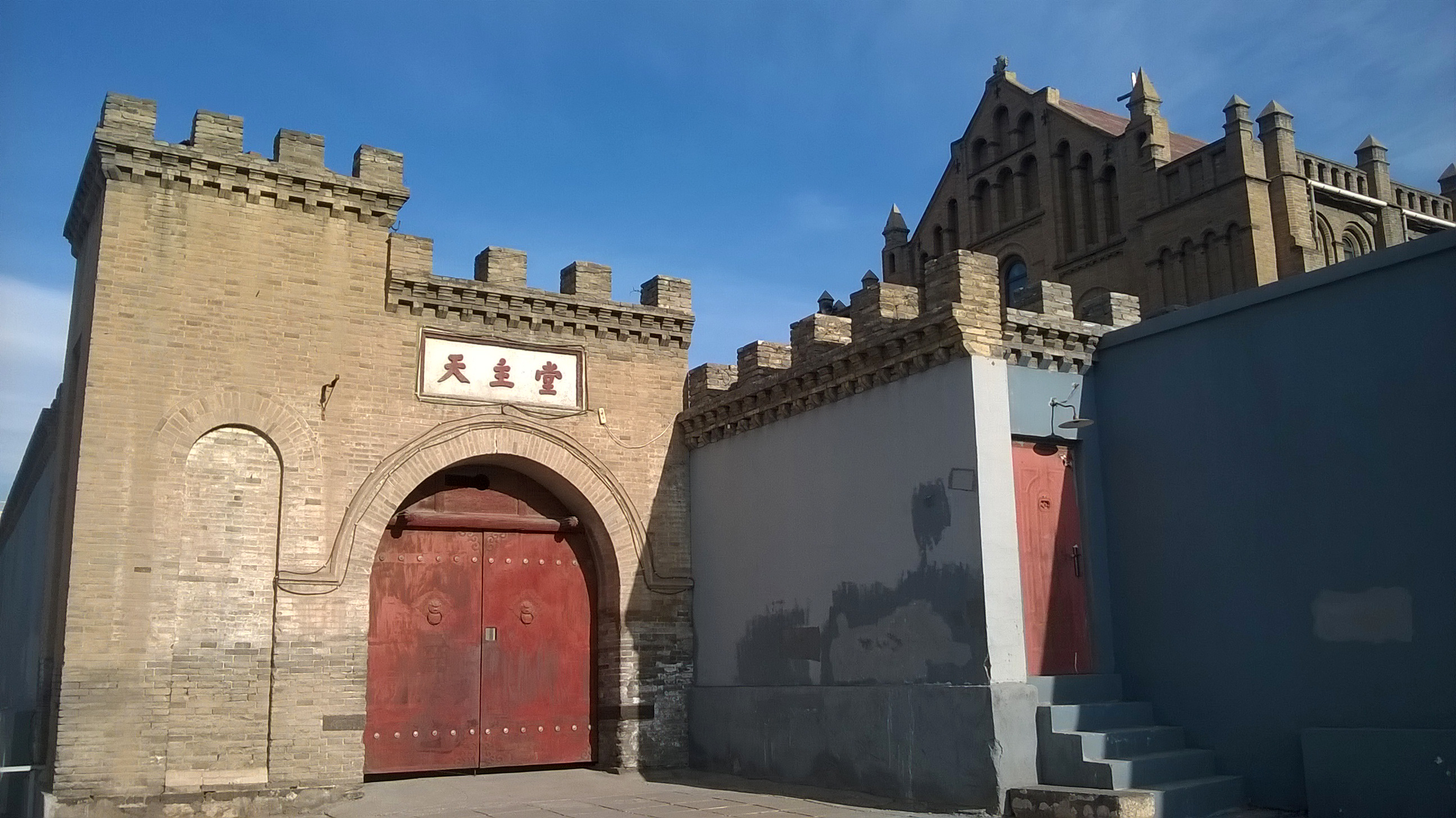
The west gate of the cathedral. The cathedral's façade is visible on the top-right.

The cathedral's architectural style is a hybrid between Gothic Revival and Romanesque Revival. It faces west and has a floor area of around 600 square metres (6,500 sq ft). The front façade is 25 metres (82 ft) tall and 20 metres (66 ft) wide. The cathedral was planned to have two bell towers, but only the northern one was built due to the lack of materials. The bell tower is 30 metres (98 ft) tall. It once contained two bronze bells made in Europe in 1924, but one of the bells was later lost.

The episcopal residence is at the northeast of the cathedral. It was built after the cathedral in Neoclassical style. In 1934, another building was completed to the west of the episcopal residence. An orphanage was built to the east of the cathedral. Currently, the episcopal residence is used by the Catholic Seminary of Inner Mongolia, and the orphanage is used as private residence.

== See also ==
- List of cathedrals in China
- Catholic Church in China
