= Alphonse de Voss =

Missionary and catholic bishop

- Bishop of the Roman Catholic Archdiocese of Suiyuan
- Church: Cathedral of the Sacred Heart in Hohhot
- Province: Suiyuan
- Installed: 12 December 1883
- Term ended: 21 July 1888
- Predecessor: New title
- Successor: Ferdinand Hamer

Orders
- Ordination: 19 December 1863

Personal details
- Born: 21 April 1840 Bruges, Flemish Region, Belgium
- Died: 21 July 1888 (aged 48) Mongolia, Qing China
- Denomination: Roman Catholic

Alphonse de Voss (Chinese: 德玉明; pinyin: Dé Yùmíng; 21 April 1840 – 21 July 1888) was a Belgian Catholic priest, missionary, and Bishop of the Roman Catholic Archdiocese of Suiyuan between 1883 and 1888.

== Biography ==
Alphonse de Voss was born in Bruges, Flemish Region, Belgium, on 21 April 1840. He was ordained a priest on 19 December 1863. He joined the CICM Missionaries in 1868. He came to Mongolia to preach in 1869. He built a church in Shangyi County from 1872 to 1874. On 12 December 1883 the Holy See appointed him as Bishop of the Roman Catholic Archdiocese of Suiyuan. He was consecrated on 18 May 1884.

He died on 21 July 1888, aged 48.

Catholic Church titles
New title	Bishop of the Roman Catholic Archdiocese of Suiyuan; 1883–1888	Succeeded by Ferdinand Hamer
