= Thomas Zhao Duomo =

Thomas Zhao Duomo or Kexun (Chinese: 趙克勛; 1924–2018) was a Chinese Roman Catholic prelate, who served as a Bishop of the Roman Catholic Diocese of Xuanhua from 2007 until his death in 2018.

== Biography ==
Bishop Zhao Duomo was born in 1924. Is little known regarding his personal details, but he was ordained as a priest in 1951. He was clandestinely consecrated as auxiliary bishop of the Roman Catholic Diocese of Xuanhua by clandestine bishop Joseph Wei Jingyi from the Apostolic Prefecture of Qiqihar on 17 February 2004 in northwestern Hebei Province. And from 13 July 2007 he become the diocesan bishop of the same diocese.

After a raid by communist authorities in 2007, Bishop Zhao hid in a secret location to avoid further persecutions. He died there in 2018.
