= Diocese of Jining =

Roman Catholic diocese in China

Coordinates: 41.03030°N 113.13237°E

Diocese of Jining Dioecesis Zinimensis 天主教集宁教区

Location
- Country: China
- Ecclesiastical province: Suiyuan
- Metropolitan: Suiyuan

Statistics
- Area: 40,000 km^{2} (15,000 sq mi)
- Population: Total; Catholics: (as of 1950); 800,000; 36,240 (4.5%)

Information
- Rite: Latin Rite
- Cathedral: Cathedral of Our Lady of the Rosary in Ulanqab, Inner Mongolia

Current leadership
- Pope: Leo XIV
- Bishop: Anthony Yao Shun
- Metropolitan Archbishop: Paul Meng Qinglu

The Roman Catholic Diocese of Jining (Latin: Zinimen(sis), Chinese: 集寧) is a diocese located in Jining (Ulanqab) in the ecclesiastical province of Suiyuan in China.

== History ==
- February 8, 1929: Established as Apostolic Vicariate of Jining 集寧 from the Apostolic Vicariate of Xiwanzi 西彎子
- April 1, 1946: Promoted as Diocese of Jining 集寧
- September 10, 2025, Gained territory of Shiliin Gol League from the suppressed Diocese of Xuanhua 宣化

== Special churches ==
- Formal Cathedral:
  - 玫瑰營天主堂

== Leadership ==
- Bishops of Jining 集寧 (Roman rite)
  - Bishop Anthony Yao Shun (2019–)
  - Bishop John Liu Shi-gong (1995–2017)
  - Bishop Joseph Fan Heng'an (Fan Heng'an) (樊恆安) (April 11, 1946–1975)
- Vicars Apostolic of Jining 集寧 (Roman Rite)
  - Bishop Joseph Fan Heng'an (Fan Heng'an) (樊恆安) (January 10, 1933–April 11, 1946)
  - Bishop Evaristo Zhang Zhiliang (張智良) (February 10, 1929–May 26, 1932)
