= John Baptist Liu Jingshan =

- Bishop of Ningxia
- Church: Catholic Church
- Diocese: Diocese of Ningxia
- In office: 1 October 1993 – December 2009
- Predecessor: John Jiang Liren
- Successor: Joseph Li Jing

Orders
- Ordination: 26 June 1942 by Louis Morel
- Consecration: 1 October 1993 by Joseph Zong Huaide

Personal details
- Born: 24 October 1913 Dengkou County, Inner Mongolia, Republic of China
- Died: 4 February 2013 (aged 99)

John Baptist Liu Jingshan (24 October 1913 – 4 February 2013) was the Roman Catholic bishop of the Roman Catholic Diocese of Ningxia, China.

Ordained to the priesthood in 1942, Liu Jingshan was named bishop in 1993 at age eighty and was recognized by the Chinese government and the Holy See. He retired in 2009.
