= Joseph Fan Heng'an =

- Bishop of the Roman Catholic Diocese of Jining
- Church: Cathedral of Our Lady of the Rosary in Ulanqab
- Province: Suiyuan
- Diocese: Roman Catholic Diocese of Jining
- Installed: 10 January 1933
- Term ended: 1975
- Predecessor: Evaristo Zhang Zhiliang
- Successor: John Liu Shi-gong

Orders
- Ordination: 1910

Personal details
- Born: October 16, 1882 Chongli County, Hebei, China
- Died: 1975 (aged 92–93) China
- Denomination: Roman Catholic

Joseph Fan Heng'an (simplified Chinese: 樊恒安; traditional Chinese: 樊恆安; pinyin: Fán Héng'ān; 16 October 1882 - 1975) was a Chinese Catholic priest and Bishop of the Roman Catholic Diocese of Jining between 1933 and 1975.

== Biography ==
Fan was born in Chongli County, Hebei on October 16, 1882, during the late Qing dynasty (1644–1911). He was ordained a priest on September 24, 1910. On January 10, 1933, he was appointed titular bishop and apostolic vicar by the Roman Catholic Diocese of Jining. He was ordained bishop on June 11 of that year in St. Peter's Basilica in Rome by Pope Pius XI. When Jining was elevated to the diocese on April 11, 1946, he became bishop.

He died in 1975.

Catholic Church titles
| Previous: Evarist Zhang Zhiliang | Bishop of the Roman Catholic Diocese of Jining; 1933–1975 | Next: Administrator Father Ai Shijun, then Bishop John Liu Shi-gong |
