= Andrew Hao =

Andrew Hao or Hao Jinli (Chinese: 郝进礼; 1916 – March 9, 2011) was the Roman Catholic bishop of the Roman Catholic Diocese of Xiwanzi, China.

Ordained in 1943, Hao arrested in 1958. Released in 1981, he was secretly ordained a bishop in 1984.
