= Everard Ter Laak =

- Vicars Apostolic of Xiwanzi
- Province: Gansu
- Diocese: Roman Catholic Diocese of Qinzhou; Roman Catholic Diocese of Xiwanzi
- Installed: 12 January 1924
- Term ended: 5 May 1931
- Predecessor: Jeroom Van Aertselaer
- Successor: Leone Giovanni M. De Smedt

Orders
- Ordination: 1892

Personal details
- Born: November 5, 1868 Didam, Montferland, Netherlands
- Died: May 5, 1931 (aged 62) Gaojiayingzi, China
- Denomination: Roman Catholic
- Parents: Jacobus Everardus Ter Laak; Maria Bernardina van der Grinten

Chinese name
- Traditional Chinese: 蘭克複
- Simplified Chinese: 兰克复
Transcriptions
Standard Mandarin
- Hanyu Pinyin: Lán Kèfù

Everard Ter Laak (Chinese: 兰克复; November 5, 1868 – May 5, 1931) was a Dutch Roman Catholic missionary and bishop who worked in China during the late Qing dynasty and early Republic of China.

== Biography ==
Ter Laak was born on November 5, 1868, in Didam, Montferland, Netherlands, the son of the Miller Jacobus Everardus Ter Laak (1824–1888) and his wife Maria Bernardina van der Grinten (1832–1886).

On November 17, 1889, he entered the Congregation of the Immaculate Heart of Mary. On April 3, 1892, he was ordained a priest within the congregation and went on mission to the Qing Empire.

On June 21, 1906, Pope Pius X appointed him apostolic vicar of the Southern Kansu. In 1914 he was appointed titular bishop of Paroecopolis. The episcopal consecration Jerome van Aertselaer donated him. Co-consecrators were Alphonse Bermyn and Conrad Abels. At the same time he was appointed apostolic coadjutor vicar of Central Mongolia. In 1922, the Apostolic Vicariate of Central Mongolia was renamed the Apostolic Vicariate of Chahar. In 1924 he was appointed as the successor of Jeroom Van Aertselaer, which was renamed in the same year the Apostolic Vicariate of Xiwanzi. At the same time he was superior of Urga in Mongolia.

In addition, from 1924 until his death, he was the apostolic administrator of the mission of sui iuris Urgi in Mongolia.

Ter Laak died on 5 May 1931 at the age of 62.

Catholic Church titles
| Previous: New position | Vicars Apostolic of Southern Kansu; 1906-1914 | Next: Costante Daems |
| Previous: Jeroom Van Aertselaer | Vicars Apostolic of Xiwanzi; 1924-1931 | Next: Leone Giovanni M. De Smedt |
