= List of cathedrals in Hong Kong =

The list of cathedrals in Hong Kong, sorted by denominations, is as follows:

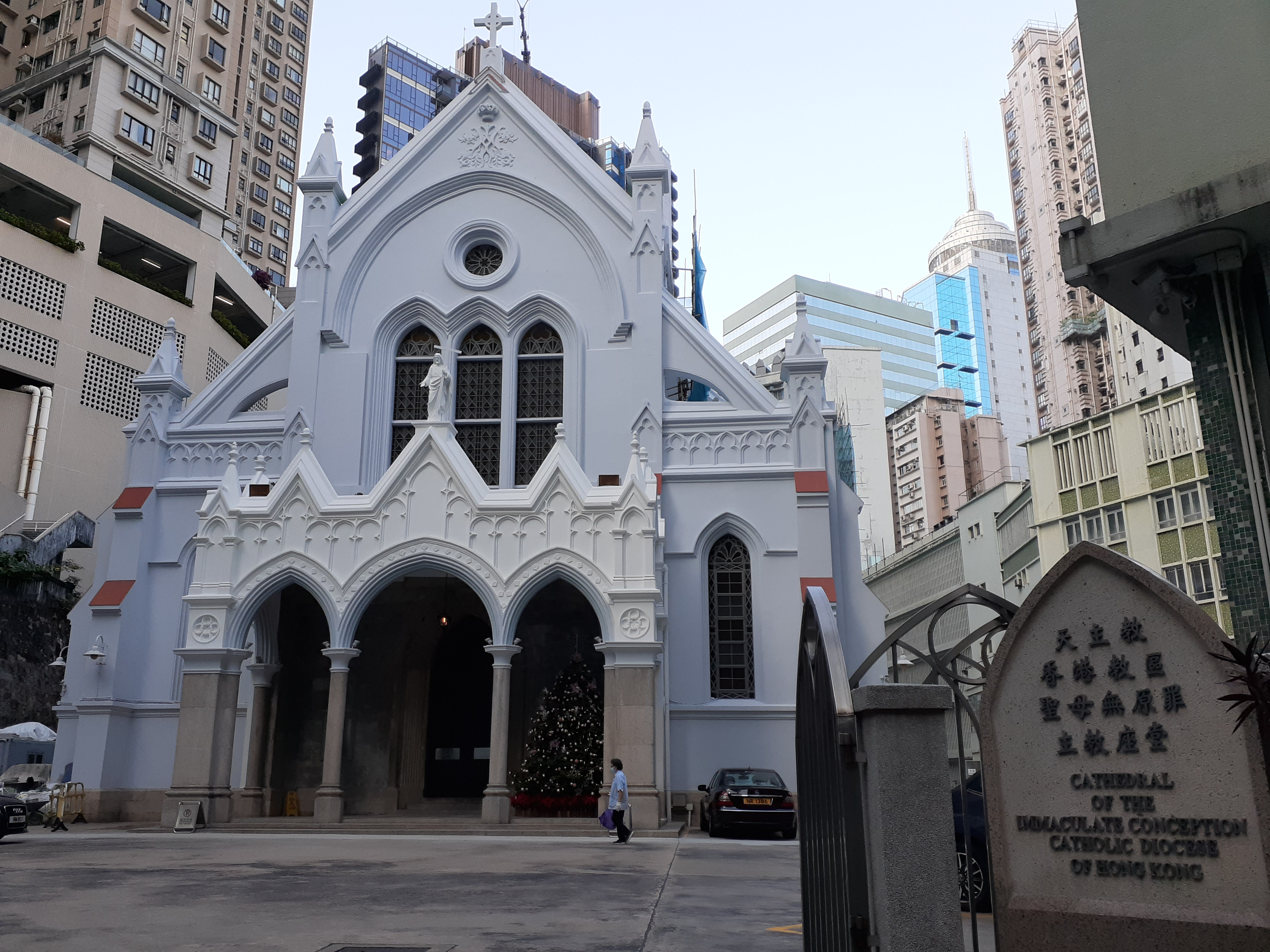
Cathedral of the Immaculate Conception

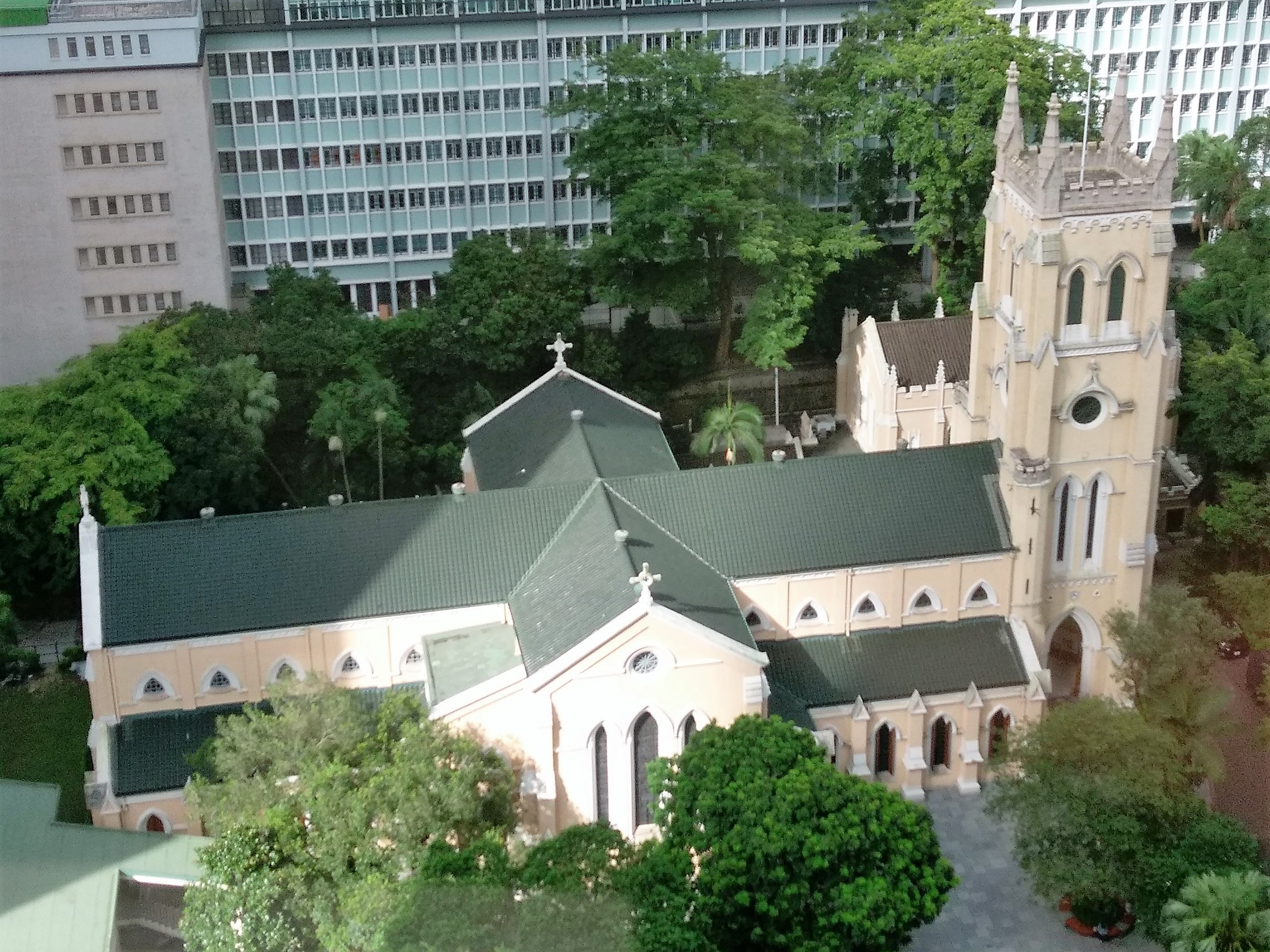
Cathedral Church of Saint John the Evangelist

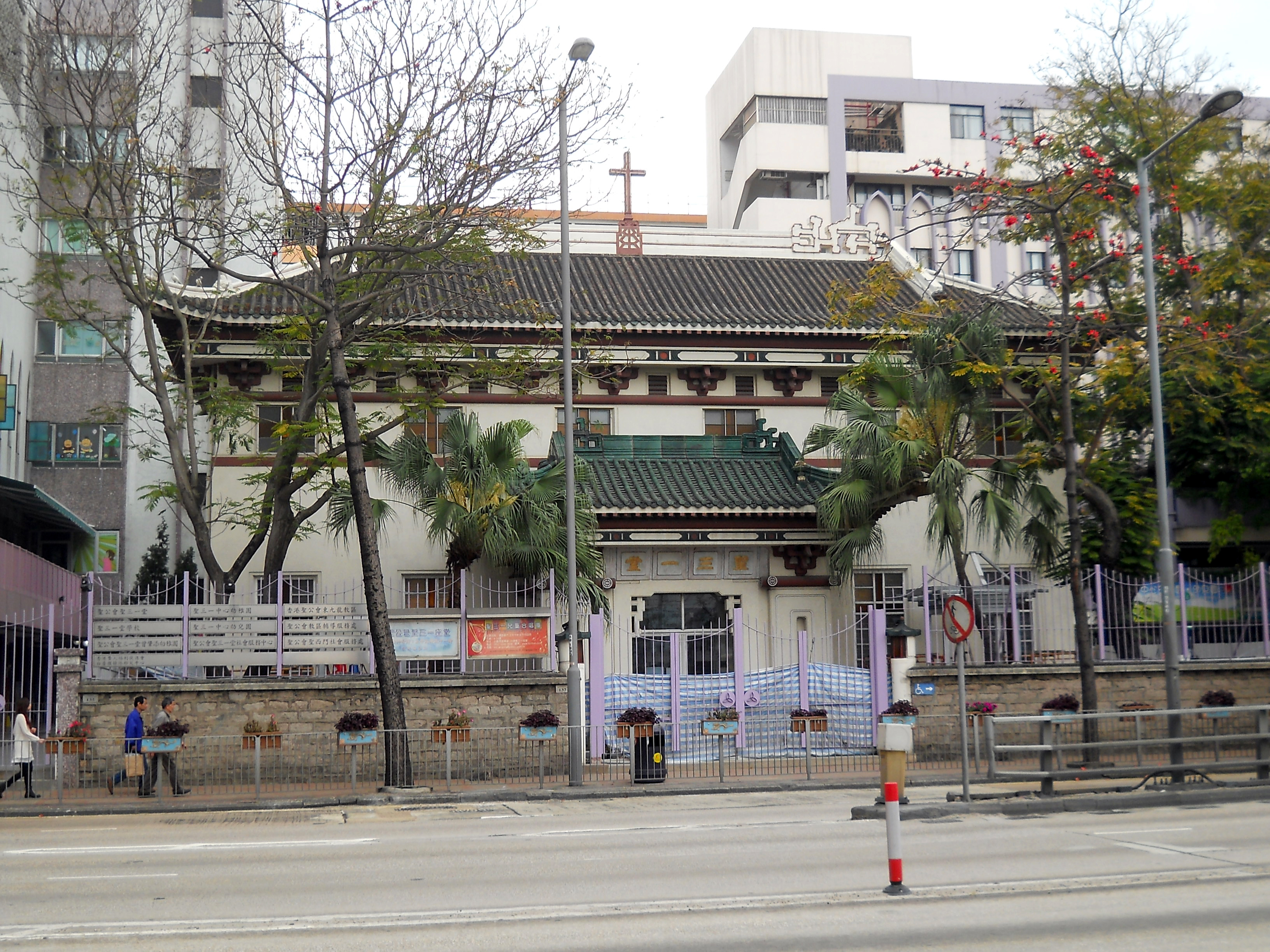
Holy Trinity Cathedral

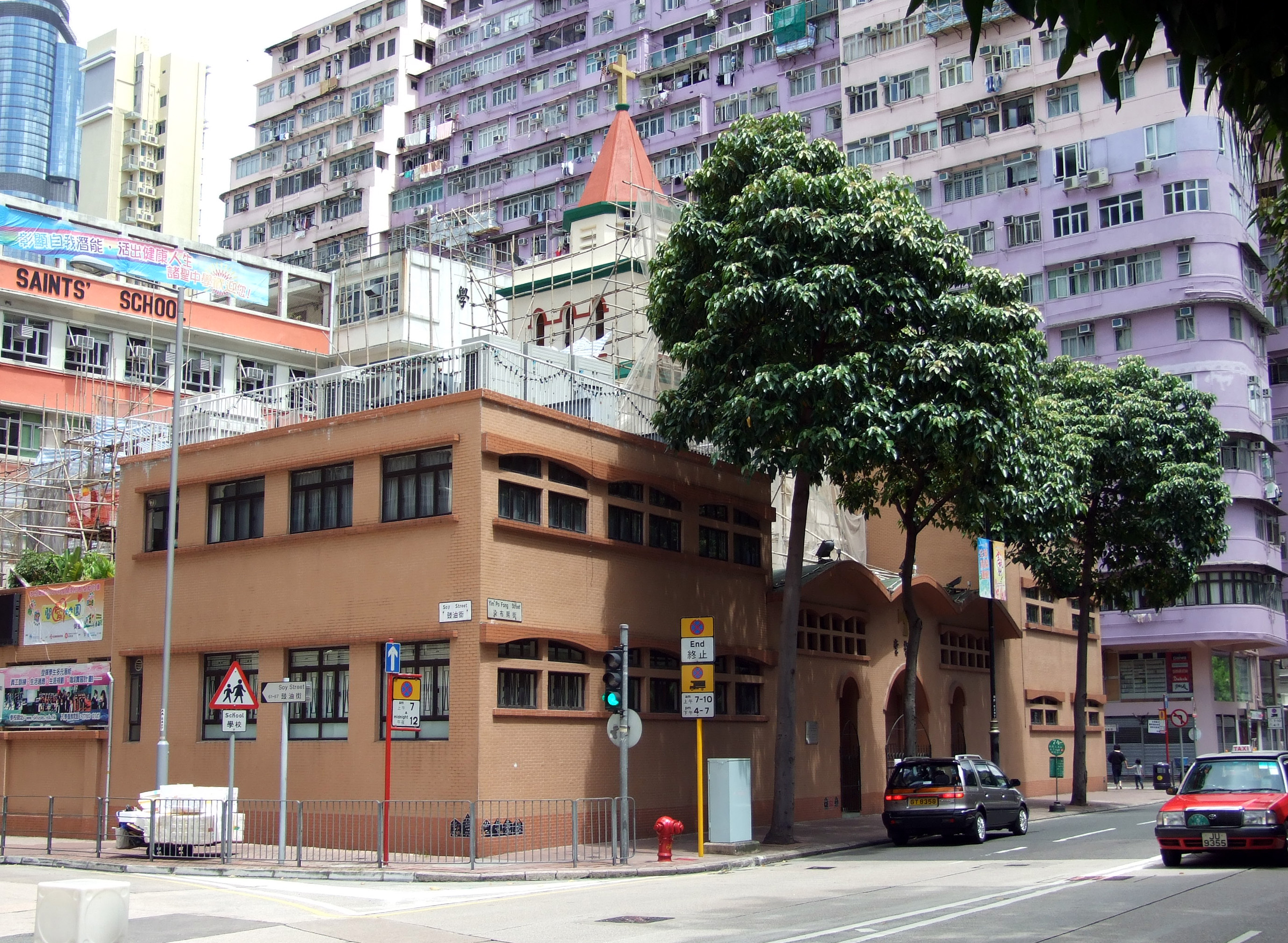
All Saints' Cathedral

== Roman Catholicism ==
- Cathedral of the Immaculate Conception, Mid-Levels

== Anglicanism ==
- Cathedral Church of Saint John the Evangelist, Central
- Holy Trinity Cathedral, Kowloon City
- All Saints' Cathedral, Mong Kok

== Eastern Orthodoxy ==
- Apostle and Evangelist Luke Cathedral of Hong Kong, Central

== See also ==
- List of cathedrals
- Christianity in Hong Kong
