= Diocese of Ningxia =

Roman Catholic diocese in China

Coordinates: 38.46750°N 106.26388°E

Diocese of Ningxia Dioecesis Nimsciianus 天主教宁夏教区

Location
- Country: China
- Ecclesiastical province: Suiyuan
- Metropolitan: Suiyuan

Statistics
- Area: 200,000 km^{2} (77,000 sq mi)
- Population: Total; Catholics: (as of 1950); 1,000,000; 35,313 (3.5%)

Information
- Denomination: Catholic Church
- Sui iuris church: Latin Church
- Rite: Roman Rite
- Cathedral: Cathedral of the Immaculate Heart of Mary in Yinchuan

Current leadership
- Pope: Leo XIV
- Bishop: Joseph Li Jing
- Metropolitan Archbishop: Paul Meng Qinglu

The Diocese of Ningxia/Yinchuan (Latin: Nimsciian(us), simplified Chinese: 宁夏/银川; traditional Chinese: 寧夏/銀川; pinyin: Níngxià/Yínchuān) is a Latin Rite suffragan diocese in the ecclesiastical province of the Metropolitan Archbishopric of Suiyuan, in north(west)ern China, but depends on the missionary Roman Congregation for the Evangelization of Peoples.

No statistics available. Its episcopal see is the Cathedral of the Immaculate Heart of Mary, located in the city of Yinchuan, Ningxia autonomous region.

== History ==
- Established on 14 March 1922 as the Apostolic Vicariate of Ningxia (寧夏), on territory split off from the then Apostolic Vicariate of Southwestern Mongolia (西南蒙古)
- Promoted on 11 April 1946 as Diocese of Ningxia

== Episcopal ordinaries ==
(all Roman rite; until 1980 European missionary members of a Latin congregation)

Apostolic Vicars of Ningxia

- Goffredo Frederix, Scheutists (C.I.C.M.) (费达德) (born Belgium) (March 14, 1922–retired 1930), Titular Bishop of Thagaste (1920.03.08–1938.06.18), initially as Apostolic Vicar of Northern Kansu (甘肅北境) (China) (1920.03.05–1922.03.08); died 1938
- Gaspare Schotte, C.I.C.M. (石扬休) (born Belgium) (December 21, 1931–death 13 January 1944), Titular Bishop of Petinessus (1931.12.14–1944.01.13)
- Charles Joseph van Melckebeke, C.I.C.M. (王守礼) (born Belgium) (March 14, 1946–April 11, 1946 see below), Titular Bishop of Sufes (1946.03.14–1946.04.11)

Suffragan Bishops of Ningxia

- Charles Joseph van Melckebeke, C.I.C.M. (王守礼) (see above April 11, 1946–death August 26, 1980)
- Joseph Ma Zhongmu (馬仲牧) (first Chinese incumbent) (1984–2004)
- uncanonical John Baptist Liu Jing-shan (劉靜山) (1993–20 December 2009)
- Joseph Li Jing (20 December 2009–present), succeeded as former Coadjutor Bishop of Ningxia (2007–2009).

== See also ==
- List of Catholic dioceses in China

== Sources and external links ==
- GCatholic.org, with Google map - data for all sections
- Catholic Hierarchy
