= Louis van Dyck =

Belgian Catholic priest and missionary (1862-1937)

- Bishop of the Roman Catholic Archdiocese of Suiyuan
- Church: Sacred Heart Cathedral, Hohhot
- Province: Suiyuan
- Installed: 10 August 1915
- Term ended: 5 December 1937
- Predecessor: Alfons Bermyn
- Successor: Louis Morel

Orders
- Ordination: 30 May 1885

Personal details
- Born: 21 January 1862 Loenhout, Flemish Region, Belgium
- Died: 4 December 1937 (aged 75) Hohhot, Republic of China
- Denomination: Roman Catholic

Louis van Dyck (Chinese: 葛崇德; pinyin: Gě Chóngdé; 21 January 1862 – 4 December 1937) was a Belgian Catholic priest, missionary, and Bishop of the Roman Catholic Archdiocese of Suiyuan between 1915 and 1937.

== Biography ==
Louis van Dyck was born in Loenhout, Flemish Region, Belgium, on 21 January 1862. He joined the CICM Missionaries in 1882. He was ordained a priest on 30 May 1885. He came to Mongolia to preach in 1887. On 10 August 1915 the Holy See appointed Louis van Dyck as Bishop of the Roman Catholic Archdiocese of Suiyuan to replace the dead Bishop Alfonso Bermyn. He was consecrated on 23 January 1916.

He retired in 1937, and died on 4 December that year, aged 75.

Catholic Church titles
Preceded by Alfonso Bermyn	Bishop of the Roman Catholic Archdiocese of Suiyuan; 1915–1937	Succeeded by Louis Morel
