= Sacred Heart Cathedral, Ningbo =

Coordinates: 29.8705°N 121.5497°E

Sacred Heart Cathedral
- 耶稣圣心主教座堂
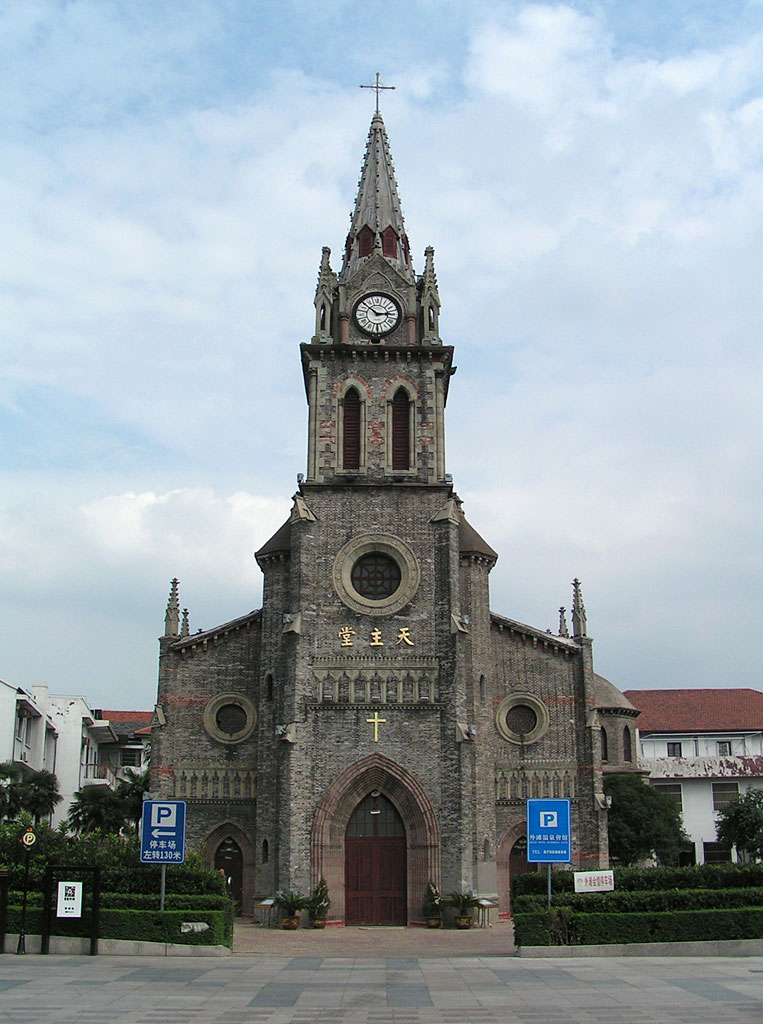
- View of the cathedral in 2005 before the fire of 2014
- Sacred Heart Cathedral
- Location: Ningbo
- Country: China
- Denomination: Roman Catholic Church

The Sacred Heart Cathedral (Chinese: 耶稣圣心主教座堂) also alternatively called the Cathedral of the Seven Sorrows of Mary is a religious building located in the city of Ningbo in Zhejiang Province of the People's Republic of China.

It served as the headquarters of the Diocese of Ningbo (Dioecesis Nimpuovensis, 天主教宁波教区) which was created on 11 April 1946. It should not be confused with the Cathedral of Our Lady of the Assumption current seat of the diocese.

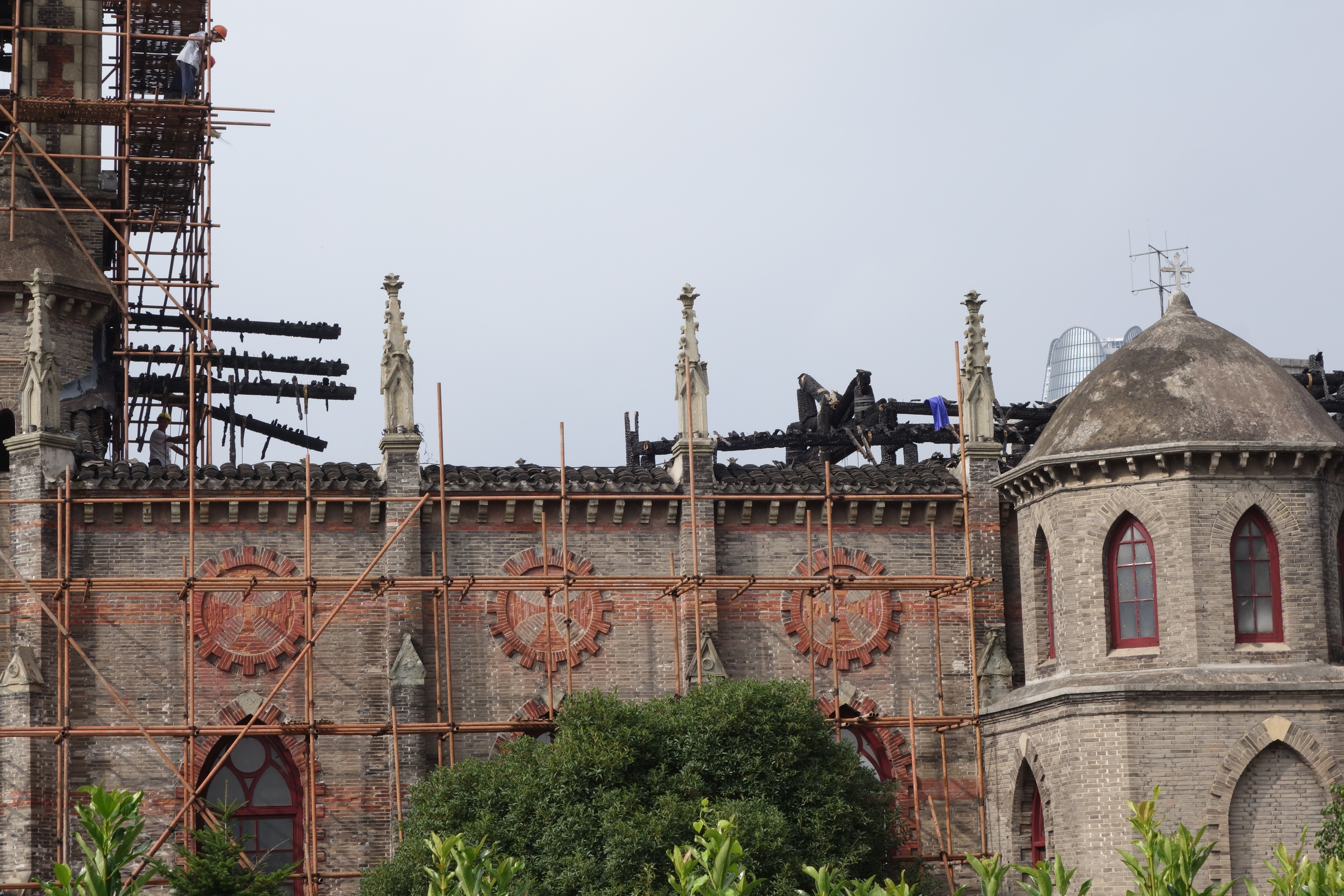
View of the ruins of the cathedral after the fire of 2014

Its history began as the church the seven sorrows of Mary in 1872 being built in the Gothic style by the French Vincentians, as the seat of the Apostolic Vicariate of Chekiang dependent Fuchow for the time being elevated to cathedral in 1876; and closed in 1963; for a few years later reopen under another name in 1980; It was declared a national heritage in 2006; and finally it was partially destroyed by fire on July 28, 2014. As of 2018, the cathedral is fully restored.

== See also ==
- Roman Catholicism in China
- Sacred Heart Cathedral (disambiguation)
