= Our Lady of the Assumption Cathedral, Ningbo =

Our Lady of the Assumption Cathedral
- 圣母升天堂
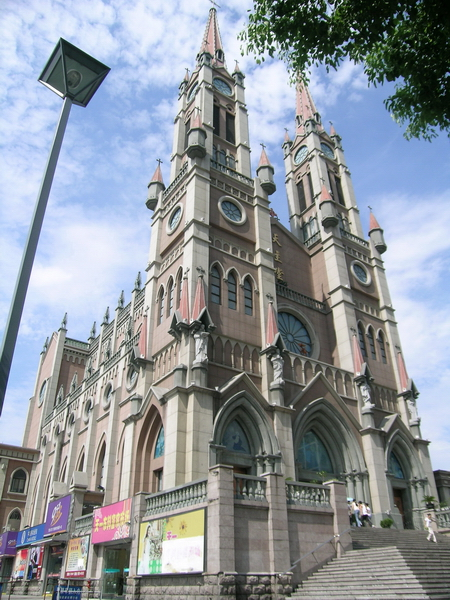
- Our Lady of the Assumption Cathedral
- Location: Ningbo
- Country: China
- Denomination: Roman Catholic Church

The Our Lady of the Assumption Cathedral (Chinese: 圣母升天堂) is a religious building belonging to the Catholic Church, which is located in the city of Ningbo in Zhejiang Province in the People's Republic of China.

The church follows the Roman Rite and functions as the headquarters of Diocese of Ningbo (Dioecesis Nimpuovensis, 天主教宁波教区) which was created on 11 April 1946. It should not be confused with Sacred Heart Cathedral (耶稣圣心主教座堂) in the same city that was destroyed by fire on 28 July 2014 and started as the "Church of the Seven Sorrows of Mary" in 1872.

The present building dates from 1853, was rebuilt in 1865 and modified between 1995 and 2000.

== See also ==
- Roman Catholicism in China
- Our Lady of the Assumption Church (disambiguation)
