= Apostolic Prefecture of Lindong =

Catholic missionary jurisdiction in China

The Apostolic Prefecture of Lindong (or Lintung) is a missionary pre-diocesan jurisdiction, not entitled to a titular bishop, in China.

It is exempt, i.e. directly subject to the Holy See, not part of any ecclesiastical province.

== History ==
On 1937.05.18, it was established as Apostolic Prefecture of Lindong 林東 (中文) alias Lintung, on territory split off from the then Apostolic Vicariate of Szepingkai 四平街).

== Ordinaries ==
(all Roman Rite )

Apostolic Prefects of Lindong

- Edgar Larochelle (藍德), Society of Foreign Missions (P.M.E.) (1937.07.23 – 1938), later Superior General of the Society of Foreign Missions (1938.07.11 – 1958.02.19)
- Joseph-Albany-Emilien Massé (馬), P.M.E. (1939.03.31 – 1943.07.29)
- Joseph-Rolland-Gustave Prévost-Godard (趙玉明), P.M.E. (1946.11.28 – 1956.11.11), later Apostolic Vicar of Pucallpa (Peru) (1956.11.11 – 1989.10.23) & Titular Bishop of Ammædara (1956.11.11 – 2005.11.13)
- uncanonical Francis Xavier Guo Zheng-ji (郭正基) (1990 – death 2004.05.03), consecrated Bishop 1990.10.28 without papal mandate
- Matthias Du Jiang (杜江) (2004– ...); consecrated Bishop clandestinely 2004.05.07

== See also ==
- Roman Catholicism in China

== Source and External links ==
- GigaCatholic, with incumbent biography links
