= Louis Morel =

Belgian missionary (1880–1971)

- Bishop of the Roman Catholic Archdiocese of Suiyuan
- Church: Cathedral of the Sacred Heart in Hohhot
- Province: Suiyuan
- Installed: 21 March 1938
- Term ended: 19 August 1951
- Predecessor: Louis van Dyck
- Successor: Francis Wang Xueming

Orders
- Ordination: 16 July 1905

Personal details
- Born: 30 October 1880 Houthem les Comines, Wallonia, Belgium
- Died: 6 June 1971 (aged 90) Hohhot, Inner Mongolia, China
- Denomination: Roman Catholic

Louis Morel (Chinese: 穆清海; pinyin: Mù Qīnghǎi; 30 October 1880 – 6 June 1971) was a Belgian Catholic priest, missionary, and Bishop of the Roman Catholic Archdiocese of Suiyuan from 1938 to 1951.

== Biography ==
Louis Morel was born in Houthem–les–Comines (now Comines-Warneton), Wallonia, Belgium, on 30 October 1880. He joined the CICM Missionaries in 1899. He was ordained a priest on 16 July 1905. He traveled to Mongolia to preach in the same year. On 21 March 1938, the Holy See appointed him as Bishop of the Roman Catholic Archdiocese of Suiyuan to replace Louis van Dyck, who died last year. He was consecrated on 18 October.

He retired on 19 August 1951 and died on 6 June 1971 at the age of 90.

Catholic Church titles
Preceded by Louis van Dyck	Bishop of the Roman Catholic Archdiocese of Suiyuan; 1938–1951	Succeeded by Francis Wang Xueming
