= Diocese of Xuanhua =

Former Latin Catholic diocese in China

Coordinates: 40°35′N 115°02′E

Diocese of Xuanhua Dioecesis Siüenhoavensis 天主教宣化教区

Location
- Country: China
- Ecclesiastical province: Beijing

Information
- Denomination: Catholic Church
- Sui iuris church: Latin Church
- Rite: Roman Rite
- Cathedral: Cathedral Holy Cross in Zhangjiakou

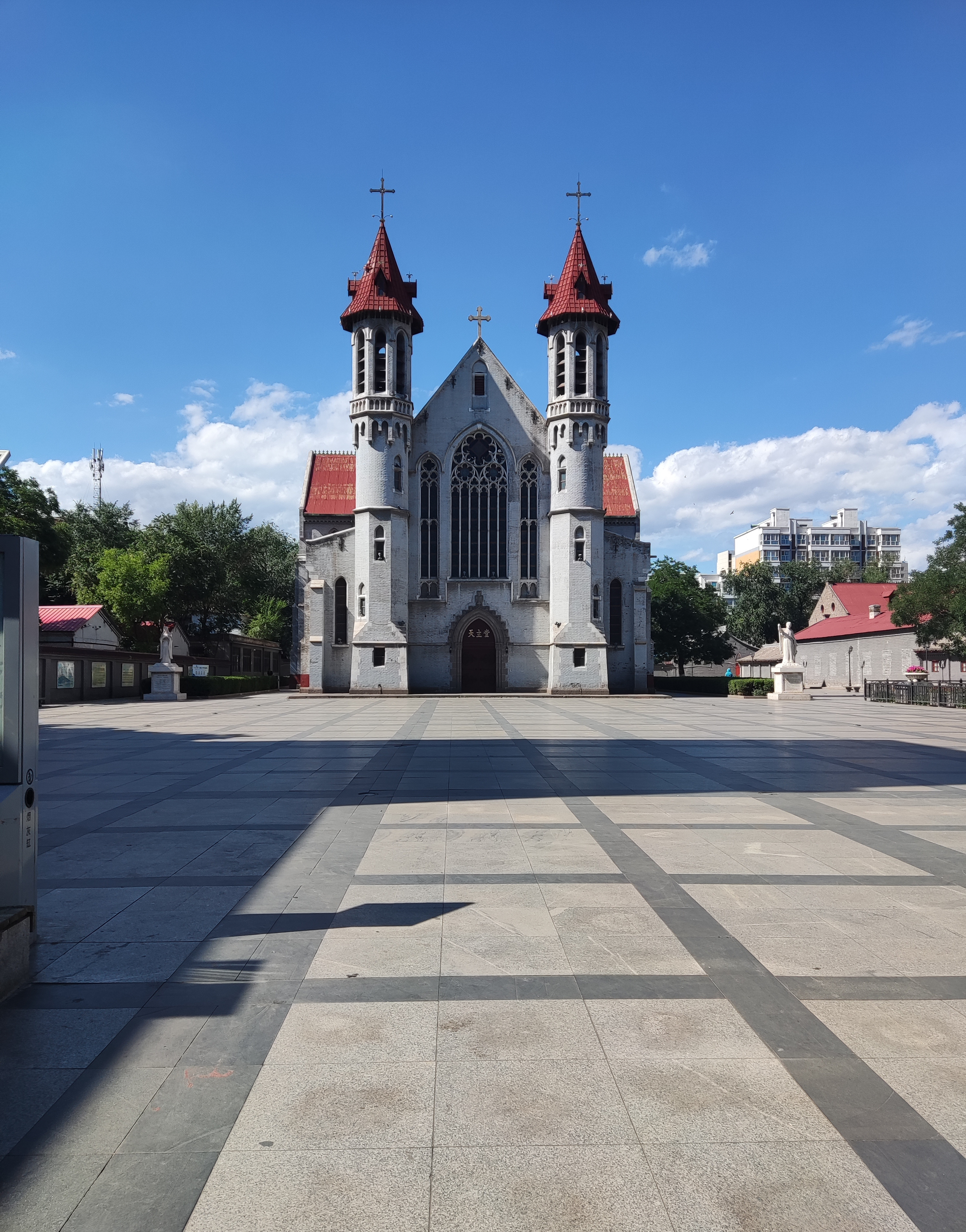
A catholic church building in the diocese

The Diocese of Xuanhua/Süanhwa (Latin: Siüenhoaven(sis), Chinese: 宣化) was a Latin Church diocese located in the city of Xuanhua in the ecclesiastical province of Beijing in China. It was suppressed on 10 September 2025, with its territory subsumed by the newly established Diocese of Zhangjiakou.

== History ==
- May 10, 1926: Established as the Apostolic Vicariate of Xuanhua (宣化国籍宗座代牧区), from the Apostolic Vicariate of Beijing 北京
- April 11, 1946: Promoted as Diocese of Xuanhua 宣化
- September 10, 2025: Diocese suppressed and merged into Zhangjiakou 張家口

== Leadership ==
- Vicars Apostolic of Xuahuafu 宣化府 (Roman Rite)
  - Bishop Philip Zhao Huai-yi (趙懷義) (May 10, 1926 – October 14, 1927)
  - Bishop Peter Cheng You-you (程有猷) (March 28, 1928 – August 25, 1935)
  - Bishop Joseph Zhang Run-bo (張潤波) (July 7, 1936 – April 11, 1946)
- Bishops of Xuanhua 宣化 (Roman rite)
  - Bishop Joseph Zhang Run-bo (張潤波) (April 11, 1946 – November 20, 1947)
  - Bishop Peter Wang Mu-duo (王木铎) (January 8, 1948 – 1959)
  - Bishop Xu Li-zhi (徐立志) (1987 - January 19, 1992)
  - Bishop Simon Zhang Jiu-mu (張九牧) (1992 - December 12, 1999)
  - Bishop Philip Peter Zhao Zhen-dong (趙振東) (December 12, 1999 - July 13, 2007)
  - Bishop Thomas Zhao Kexun (趙克勛) (July 13, 2007 – 2018)
  - Bishop Augustine Cui Tai (since 2018)
