= Paul Meng Qinglu =

Chinese clergyman

The Most Reverend Paul Meng Qinglu
- Metropolitan Archbishop of Suiyuan
- Church: Cathedral of the Sacred Heart in Hohhot
- Archdiocese: Suiyuan
- Province: Suiyuan
- Installed: 2010
- Predecessor: John Baptist Wang Xi-xian

Orders
- Ordination: 16 July 1989
- Consecration: 18 April 2010 by Paul Pei Junmin

Personal details
- Born: June 22, 1962 (age 64) China
- Denomination: Roman Catholic
- Education: Inner Mongolia University

Chinese name
- Traditional Chinese: 孟青祿
- Simplified Chinese: 孟青禄
Transcriptions
Standard Mandarin
- Hanyu Pinyin: Mèng Qīnglù

Paul Meng Qinglu (Chinese: 孟青禄; born June 22, 1962) is a Chinese clergyman and Metropolitan Archbishop of the Roman Catholic Archdiocese of Suiyuan since 2010. He is the seventh bishop of Hohhot, the capital of the Autonomous Region of Inner Mongolia in the People's Republic of China. His appointment was recognized by the Chinese government and the Holy See.

== Biography ==
Meng was born into a Catholic family, on June 22, 1962. He entered the Inner Mongolia Theological and Philosophical College in 1985.

He was ordained a priest in 1989. Paul Meng Qinglu was already elected as a bishop candidate in June 2005, a month after his predecessor John Baptist Wang Xixian died at the age of 79. Then Meng had already led the diocese's affairs for about a year, commissioned by Bishop John Baptist Wang Xixian after he had become seriously ill. The bishop had received papal mandate for ordination and was likewise approved by the government, following a more prolonged process from the government-controlled bishops' conference which took a long break around the summer games in Beijing 2008.

Bishop Wang assigned him to build new churches and serve as parish priest from 2000 to 2003. He also held leading positions in the government-led Catholic patriotic association of Inner Mongolia from 2001.

Catholic Church titles
Previous: John Baptist Wang Xixian	Metropolitan Archbishop of the Roman Catholic Archdiocese of Suiyuan; 2010	Incumbent
