= Diocese of Xiwanzi =

Former Latin Catholic diocese in China

Coordinates: 40°57′N 115°12′E

Diocese of Xiwanzi Dioecesis Sivanzeanus 天主教西湾子教区

Location
- Country: China
- Ecclesiastical province: Suiyuan

Statistics
- Area: 250,000 km^{2} (97,000 sq mi)
- Population: Total; Catholics: (as of 1950); 700,000; 40,725 (5.8%)

Information
- Denomination: Catholic Church
- Sui iuris church: Latin Church
- Rite: Roman Rite
- Cathedral: Cathedral in Chongli

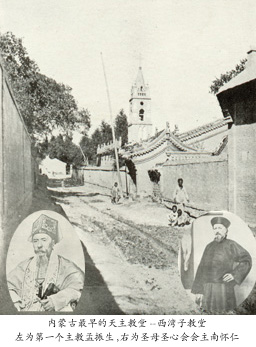
The earliest church in the Xiwanzi diocese

The Diocese of Xiwanzi/Chongli (Latin: Sivanzean(us), Chinese: 西彎子, 崇禮) was a Latin Church diocese located in the city of Xiwanzi, Chongli District in the ecclesiastical province of Suiyuan in China. It was suppressed on 10 September 2025, with its territory subsumed by the newly established Diocese of Zhangjiakou.

== History ==
- August 20, 1840: Established as Apostolic Vicariate of Mongolia 蒙古 from the Apostolic Vicariate of Liaotung 遼東
- December 21, 1883: Renamed as Apostolic Vicariate of Central Mongolia 中蒙古
- March 14, 1922: Renamed as Apostolic Vicariate of Chahar 察哈爾
- December 3, 1924: Renamed as Apostolic Vicariate of Xiwanzi 西彎子
- April 11, 1946: Promoted as Diocese of Xiwanzi 西彎子

== Leadership ==
- Bishops of Xiwanzi (Roman rite)
  - Bishop Andrew Hao Jinli (1988 - 2011)
  - Bishop Melchior Zhang Kexing (張克興) (November 24, 1951 – November 6, 1988)
  - Bishop Leone Giovanni M. De Smedt, C.I.C.M. (April 11, 1946 – November 24, 1951)
- Vicars Apostolic of Xiwanzi 西彎子 (Roman Rite)
  - Bishop Leone Giovanni M. De Smedt, C.I.C.M. (December 14, 1931 – April 11, 1946)
  - Bishop Everard Ter Laak, C.I.C.M. (January 12, 1924 – May 5, 1931)
- Vicars Apostolic of Chahaer 察哈爾 (Roman Rite)
  - Bishop Jeroom Van Aertselaer, C.I.C.M. (May 1, 1898 – January 12, 1924)
- Vicars Apostolic of Mongolia 蒙古 (Roman Rite)
  - Bishop Florent Daguin, C.M. (July 17, 1857 – May 9, 1859)
  - Bishop Joseph-Martial Mouly, C.M. (孟振生) (August 23, 1840 – April 28, 1846)
