= Archdiocese of Suiyuan =

Catholic archdiocese in China

Coordinates: 40.81067°N 111.64670°E

Archdiocese of Suiyuan Archidioecesis Soeiiüenensis 天主教绥远总教区

Location
- Country: China
- Ecclesiastical province: Suiyuan

Statistics
- Area: 100,000 km^{2} (39,000 sq mi)
- Population: Total; Catholics: (as of 1950); 1,065,775; 41,932 (3.9%)

Information
- Rite: Latin Rite
- Cathedral: Sacred Heart Cathedral, Hohhot

Current leadership
- Pope: Leo XIV
- Metropolitan Archbishop: Paul Meng Qinglu

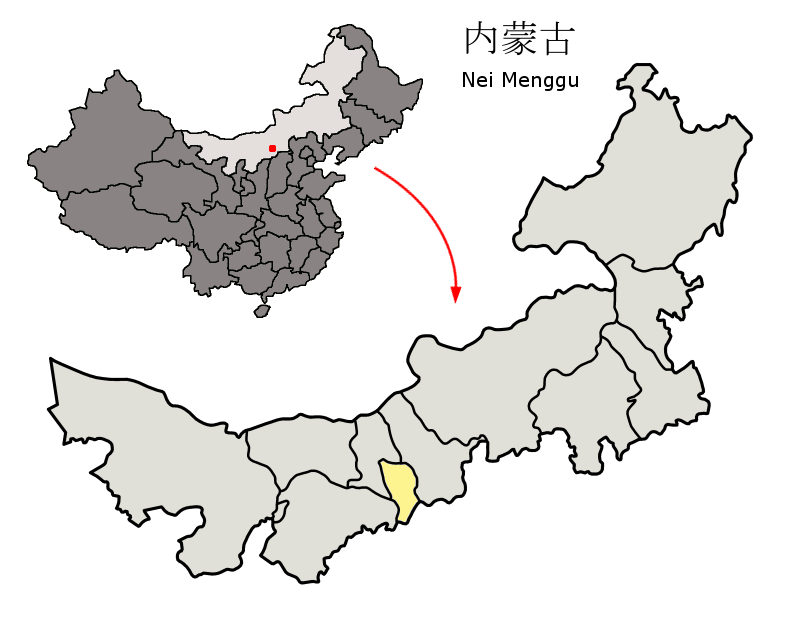
Hohhot prefecture (yellow) within the Inner Mongolia region of China

The Roman Catholic Archdiocese of Suiyuan/Hohhot (Latin: Soeiiüenen(sis), Chinese: 綏遠, 呼和浩特) is an archdiocese located in the city of Hohhot in China.

== History ==
- December 21, 1883: Established as Apostolic Vicariate of Southwestern Mongolia 西南蒙古 from the Apostolic Vicariate of Mongolia 蒙古
- March 14, 1922: Renamed as Apostolic Vicariate of Suiyuan
- 1946.04.11: Promoted as Metropolitan Archdiocese of Suiyuan 綏遠

== Leadership ==
- Archbishops of Suiyuan (Roman rite)
  - Archbishop Paul Meng Qinglu (2010–present)
  - Archbishop John Baptist Wang Xi-xian (1997 - 2005)
  - Archbishop Francis Wang Xueming (王學明) (August 19, 1951 – February 10, 1997)
  - Archbishop Louis Morel, C.I.C.M. (April 11, 1946 – August 19, 1951)
- Vicars Apostolic of Suiyuan 綏遠 (Roman Rite)
  - Bishop Louis Morel, C.I.C.M. (later Archbishop) (March 21, 1938 – April 11, 1946)
  - Bishop Louis van Dyck, C.I.C.M. (葛崇德) (August 10, 1915 – December 5, 1937)
- Vicars Apostolic of Southwestern Mongolia 西南蒙古 (Roman Rite)
  - Bishop Alfons Bermyn, C.I.C.M. (闵玉清) (April 3, 1901 – February 16, 1915)
  - Bishop Ferdinand Hamer, C.I.C.M. (韩默理) (1889–1900)
  - Bishop Alfons De Vos, C.I.C.M. (德玉明) (1883–1889)

== Suffragan dioceses ==
- Jining 集寧
- Ningxia 寧夏
- Xiwanzi 西彎子
