= Joseph Han Yingjin =

Chinese Catholic priest

Most Reverend Joseph Han Yingjin
- Bishop of Sanyuan
- Church: Cathedral of the Sacred Heart of Jesus in Sanyuan
- Archdiocese: Roman Catholic Archdiocese of Xi'an
- Diocese: Roman Catholic Diocese of Sanyuan
- Installed: 2007
- Predecessor: John Chrysostom Lan Shi

Orders
- Ordination: 1992
- Consecration: 24 June 2010 by Bishop Joseph Tsong Huaide (Zhong Huaide)

Personal details
- Born: 1958 (age 67–68) Xianyang, Shaanxi
- Denomination: Roman Catholic
- Coat of arms

Joseph Han Yingjin (simplified Chinese: 韩英进; traditional Chinese: 韓英進; pinyin: Hán Yīngjìn; born 1958) is a Chinese Catholic priest and has been Bishop of the Roman Catholic Diocese of Sanyuan since June 24, 2010.

== Biography ==
Han was born into a Catholic family in Xianyang, Shaanxi, in 1958. Han joined the Catholic priesthood seminary in 1986. He was ordained a priest in 1992. In 1993, he was appointed parish priest. Later He studied at two universities. In 2007, he was nominated as a diocesan candidate. In 2008, Pope Benedict XVI gave his approval. He became Bishop of the Roman Catholic Diocese of Sanyuan on June 24, 2010. His predecessor, Bishop Joseph Zong Huaide, was the chief secretary. Other bishops who participated in the ordination were Anthony Dang Mingyan, Louis Yu Runchen, Joseph Tong Changping, Nicholas Han Jide, and Joseph Li Jing. All were approved by the Holy See and the Communist government.

Catholic Church titles
Previous: John Chrysostom Lan Shi	Bishop of the Roman Catholic Diocese of Sanyuan; 2010	Incumbent
