= Diocese of Hanzhong =

Latin Catholic territory in China

Diocese of Hanzhong Dioecesis Hanciomensis 天主教漢中教區 天主教汉中教区
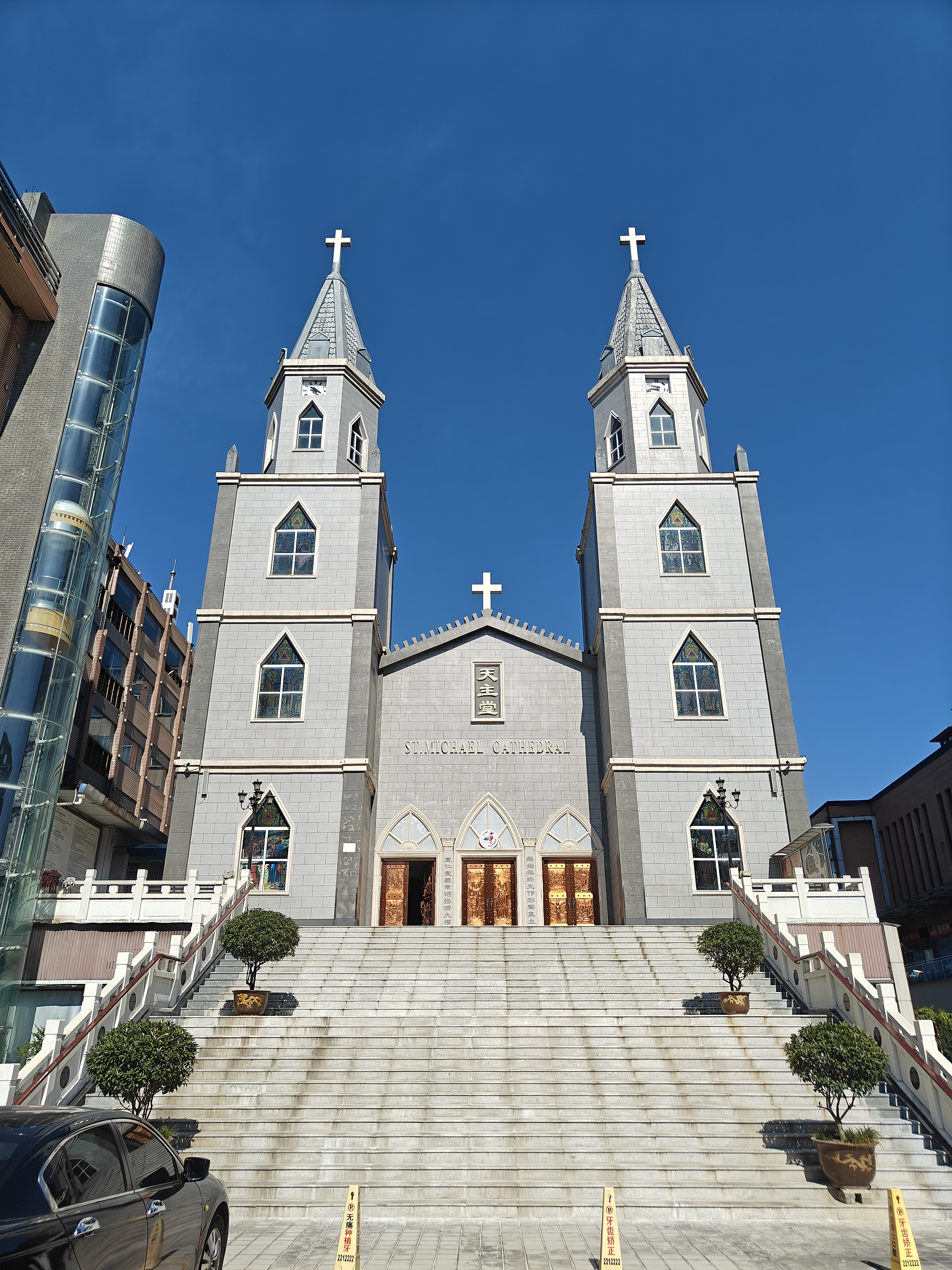
- St. Michael's Cathedral, Hanzhong

Location
- Country: China
- Ecclesiastical province: Xi'an
- Metropolitan: Xi'an

Statistics
- Population: Total; Catholics: (as of 1950); 1,500,000; 19,060 (1.3%)

Information
- Denomination: Catholic Church
- Sui iuris church: Latin Church
- Rite: Roman Rite
- Established: August 2, 1887 (as apostolic vicariate)
- Cathedral: St. Michael's Cathedral, Hanzhong

Current leadership
- Pope: Leo XIV
- Bishop: Stefano Xu Hongwei
- Metropolitan Archbishop: Anthony Dang Mingyan

The Diocese of Hanzhong (formerly spelled Hanchung; Latin: Dioecesis Hanciomensis; Chinese: 天主教漢中教區), also known as Diocese of Nancheng, is a Latin Catholic ecclesiastical territory or diocese of the Catholic Church in Shaanxi, China. The episcopal see is the city of Hanzhong in Southern Shaanxi. The Diocese of Hanzhong is in the ecclesiastical province of the metropolitan Archdiocese of Xi'an. It was established on August 2, 1887 as an apostolic vicariate.

The Diocese of Hanzhong is bordered by the Diocese of Qinzhou to the west; Apostolic Prefecture of Xing'anfu to the east; Archdiocese of Xi'an, Diocese of Zhouzhi and Diocese of Fengxiang to the north; and Diocese of Chengdu and Diocese of Shunqing to the south.

== History ==
- August 2, 1887: Established as the Apostolic Vicariate of Southern Shensi from the Apostolic Vicariate of Shensi
- December 3, 1924: Renamed as Apostolic Vicariate of Hanchungfu
- April 11, 1946: Promoted as Diocese of Hanchung

== Bishops ==
Vicars Apostolic of Southern Shensi

- Pio Giuseppe Passerini, P.I.M.E. (March 29, 1895 – April 24, 1918)
- Antonio Maria Capettini, P.I.M.E. (April 2, 1919 – December 3, 1924)

Vicars Apostolic of Hanchungfu

- Antonio Maria Capettini, P.I.M.E. (December 3, 1924 – 1925)
- Lorenzo Maria Balconi, P.I.M.E. (later Archbishop) (March 7, 1928 – 1935)
- Mario Civelli, P.I.M.E. (March 11, 1935 – April 11, 1946)

Bishops of Hanchung

- Mario Civelli, P.I.M.E. (April 11, 1946 – February 2, 1966)
- Giuseppe Maggi, P.I.M.E. (January 13, 1949 – August 17, 1963)

Bishops of Hanzhong

- Bartholomew Yu Chengti (1984 - 2003)
  - Matthias Yu Chengxin, coadjutor (December 1989 – 2007)
- Louis Yu Run-shen (1986–2019)
- Stefano Xu Hongwei (2019-Present)

== Gallery ==
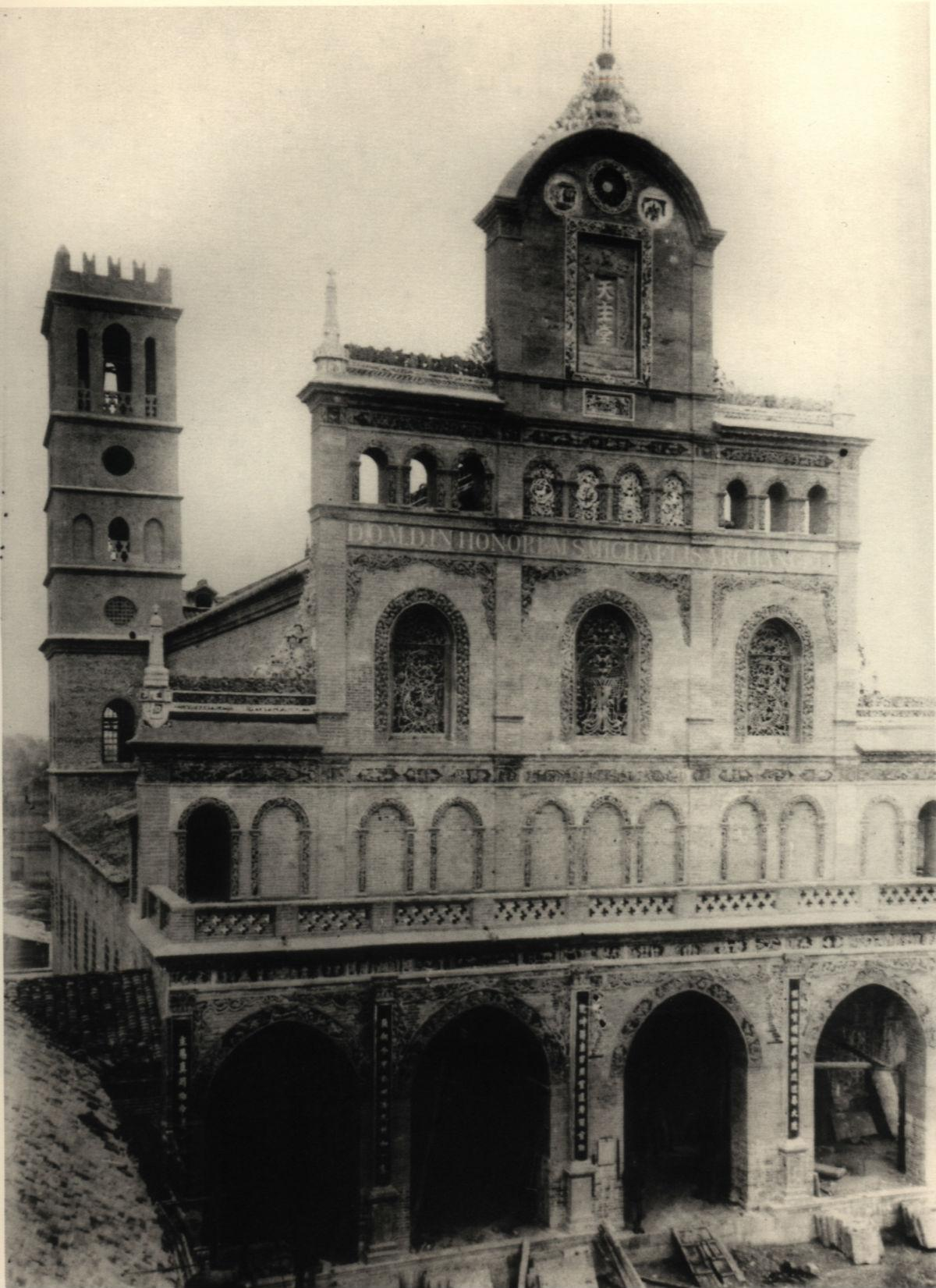
Original building of St. Michael's Cathedral, destroyed during the Cultural Revolution.

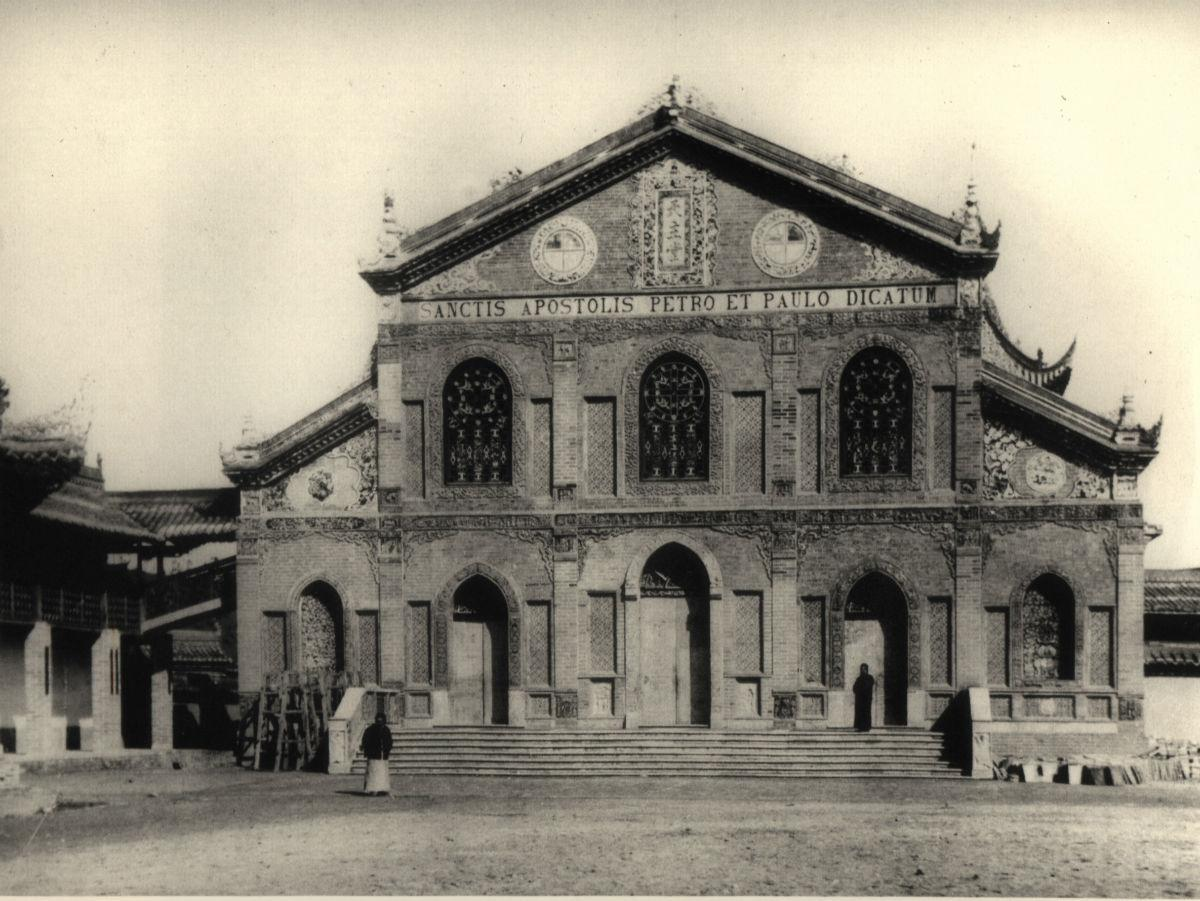
Saints Peter and Paul Cathedral, Hanzhong, former cathedral of the diocese, partially demolished during the Cultural Revolution.
