= Peter Zhang Zhiyong =

Chinese Roman Catholic bishop (born 1931)

The Most Reverend Peter Zhang Zhiyong
- Coadjutor Bishop Emeritus of Fengxiang
- Church: Roman Catholic Church
- Diocese: Fengxiang
- Appointed: 6 January 1996
- Term ended: 2010
- Predecessor: —
- Successor: Peter Li Huiyuan

Orders
- Ordination: 1 March 1980
- Consecration: 6 January 1996

Personal details
- Born: 1 March 1931 (age 95) Shaanxi Province, China
- Denomination: Roman Catholic

Peter Zhang Zhiyong (Chinese: 張志勇; born 1 March 1931) is a Chinese Roman Catholic prelate who served as Coadjutor Bishop of the Diocese of Fengxiang from 1996 until his retirement in 2010. He is recognized by the Holy See as a bishop and holds the title of Coadjutor Bishop Emeritus of Fengxiang.

== Early life and priesthood ==
Zhang was born on 1 March 1931 in Shaanxi Province, China. He was ordained a priest on 1 March 1980 during a period of gradual restoration of Church structures in mainland China following the Cultural Revolution.

== Episcopal ministry ==
He was consecrated Coadjutor Bishop of Fengxiang on 6 January 1996 by Bishop Lucas Li Jing-feng of Fengxiang.

The Diocese of Fengxiang is notable for its strong adherence to the Holy See and historically limited participation in the state-sanctioned Chinese Catholic Patriotic Association. In 2011, during the diocesan process that elected Peter Li Huiyuan as bishop candidate, Zhang was present as a senior cleric of the diocese.

He retired from active ministry in 2010 and assumed the title Coadjutor Bishop Emeritus of Fengxiang.
