= Diocese of Yan'an =

Roman Catholic diocese in China

Coordinates: 36.6000°N 109.4830°E

Diocese of Yan'an Dioecesis Iennganensis 天主教延安教区

Location
- Country: China
- Ecclesiastical province: Xi'an
- Metropolitan: Xi'an

Information
- Rite: Latin Rite

Current leadership
- Pope: Leo XIV
- Bishop: John Baptist Yang Xiaoting
- Metropolitan Archbishop: Anthony Dang Mingyan

The Roman Catholic Diocese of Yan'an/Fushi (Latin: Iennganen(sis), Chinese: 延安, 膚施) is a diocese located in the city of Yan'an (Shaanxi) in the ecclesiastical province of Xi'an in China.

== History ==
- October 15, 1696: Established as the Apostolic Vicariate of Shensi 陝西 from the Diocese of Nanjing 南京
- 1712: Renamed as Apostolic Vicariate of Shensi and Shansi 陝西山西
- March 2, 1844: Renamed as Apostolic Vicariate of Shensi 陝西
- August 2, 1887: Renamed as Apostolic Vicariate of Northern Shensi 陝西北境
- December 3, 1924: Renamed as Apostolic Vicariate of Yan'anfu 延安府
- April 11, 1946: Promoted as Diocese of Yan'an 延安

== Leadership ==
- Bishops of Yan'an 延安 (Roman rite)
  - Bishop John Baptist Yang Xiaoting (2011–present)
  - Bishop Francis Tong Hui (1999 - 2011)
  - Bishop Pacific Li Huan-de, O.F.M. (李宣德) (December 13, 1951 – 1973)
  - Bishop Celestino Ibáñez y Aparicio, O.F.M. (April 11, 1946 – January 13, 1949)
- Vicars Apostolic of Yan’anfu 延安府 (Roman Rite)
  - Bishop Celestino Ibáñez y Aparicio, O.F.M. (December 3, 1924 – April 11, 1946)
- Vicars Apostolic of Northern Shensi 陝西北境 (Roman Rite)
  - Bishop Celestino Ibáñez y Aparicio, O.F.M. (April 12, 1911 – December 3, 1924)
  - Bishop Auguste-Jean-Gabriel Maurice, O.F.M. (穆理思) (August 1, 1908 – April 12, 1911)
  - Bishop Clemente Coltelli, O.F.M. (郭德禮) (April 19, 1900 – January 28, 1901)
  - Bishop Pasquale Pagnucci, O.F.M. (林奇愛) (August 2, 1887 – January 29, 1901)
  - Bishop Pio Vidi, O.F.M. (魏明德) (August 2, 1887 – April 19, 1900)
- Vicars Apostolic of Shensi 陝西 (Roman Rite)
  - Bishop Pio Vidi, O.F.M. (魏明德) (August 24, 1886 – August 2, 1887)
  - Bishop Pasquale Pagnucci, O.F.M. (林奇愛) (April 12, 1884 – August 2, 1887)
