= Joseph Wu Qinjing =

Chinese Catholic priest (born 1968)

- Bishop of the Roman Catholic Diocese of Zhouzhi
- Church: Cathedral of the Immaculate Heart of Mary in Zhouzhi
- Province: Shaanxi
- Diocese: Roman Catholic Diocese of Zhouzhi
- Installed: 2005
- Predecessor: Anthony Li Du'an

Orders
- Ordination: 1996 by Yang Guangyan

Personal details
- Born: November 11, 1968 (age 58) Xingping, Shaanxi, China
- Denomination: Roman Catholic
- Education: College of Saint Benedict and Saint John's University; Fordham University

Chinese name
- Traditional Chinese: 吳欽敬
- Simplified Chinese: 吴钦敬
Transcriptions
Standard Mandarin
- Hanyu Pinyin: Wú Qīnjìng

Joseph Wu Qinjing (Chinese: 吴钦敬; born November 11, 1968) is a Chinese Catholic priest and the current bishop of Zhouzhi since 2005.

== Biography ==
Wu was born in Wufeng Village of Xingping, Shaanxi, on November 11, 1968. After high school in 1989, he was accepted to Shanghai Sheshan Seminary, where he graduated in 1995.

He was ordained a priest by Yang Guangyan (Chinese: 杨广彦) on February 11, 1996. In 2000, he went to the United States for further study. Three years later, he received a master's degree in etiquette theology from St. John's University, Minnesota. After receiving a master's degree from Fordham University in New York in 2005, he returned home and continued to teach at Shaanxi Seminary.

In September 2006, he was put under house arrest by the Communist government. He was released in 2014.

In 2010 he was elected Bishop of the Roman Catholic Diocese of Zhouzhi. He accepted the episcopacy with the papal mandate on October 19, 2005.

Catholic Church titles
| Previous: Anthony Li Du'an | Bishop of the Roman Catholic Diocese of Zhouzhi; 2005 | Incumbent |
