= John Bai Ningxian =

Chinese Roman Catholic bishop

John Bai Ningxian (Chinese: 白宁贤; 20 January 1921 – before 2022) was a Chinese Roman Catholic bishop.

== Biography ==
Bishop Bai Ningxian was born in 1921. Little is known regarding his personal details, but he was ordained as a priest on 20 June 1951. He was clandestinely consecrated as bishop by clandestine bishop Joseph Zong Huaide from the Roman Catholic Diocese of Sanyuan on 7 May 1997, and served as his auxiliary. He wasn't assigned to any ecclesiastical circumscription.

In 2022, Catholic Hierarchy updated his profile to clarify that he is deceased, though a precise date or year is not known.
