= Joseph Zong Huaide =

Joseph Zong Huaide (simplified Chinese: 宗怀德; traditional Chinese: 宗懷德; pinyin: Zōng Huáidé), may refer to:

- Joseph Zong Huaide (Shandong), Bishop of the Catholic Diocese of Zhoucun.
- Joseph Zong Huaide (Shaanxi), Bishop of the Catholic Diocese of Sanyuan.
