= John Chrysostom Lan Shi =

Chinese bishop (1925–2014)

- Bishop of Sanyuan
- Church: Catholic Church
- Diocese: Diocese of Sanyuan
- In office: 28 November 2000 – 2010
- Predecessor: Joseph Zong Huaide
- Successor: Joseph Han Yingjin
- Previous post: Coadjutor Bishop of Sanyuan (2000)

Orders
- Ordination: 1954
- Consecration: 28 November 2000 by Lawrence Zhang Wenbin

Personal details
- Born: 1925 Tongyuan (north of Jingwei), Shaanxi, Republic of China
- Died: 21 September 2014 (aged 88–89)

John Chrysostom Lan Shi (1925 – 21 September 2014) was a Catholic bishop.

Born in China, Lan Shi was ordained a priest in 1954. On 2000, he was clandestinely consecrated coadjutor bishop of the Diocese of Sanyuan. From 2003 to 2008 was a bishop ordinary at the same diocese.
