= Anthony Zhang Gangyi =

Chinese Franciscan priest (1907–1997)

- 张刚毅
- Born: 1907; Shaanxi, China
- Died: March 20, 1997 (aged 89–90); Zhangerce Village, Gaoling, Shaanxi
- Occupation: Franciscan priest

Anthony Zhang Gangyi (Chinese: 张刚毅, 1907 – 1997) was a Chinese Franciscan priest from Shaanxi. During World War II, he was a chaplain of a prison in Fascist Italy, where he assisted the escape of prisoners. He was later imprisoned by the People's Republic of China from 1959 to 1979, and again in 1989. He hosted the first conference of China's underground bishops.

== Biography ==
Zhang was born into a poor Catholic family in Shaanxi in 1907. When he was 13, he began to attend the minor seminary of the diocese. He later studied at the Franciscan seminary in Ankang. He went to Italy to study theology in 1930. There he entered the Franciscan order, made his first vows in 1935, and was ordained a priest in Rome in 1937. In 1940, Pope Pius XII appointed Zhang as a chaplain at a prison of 4,000 prisoners operated by Fascist authorities. At the prison, he assisted the inmates' escape in December 1944, was arrested and imprisoned because of his anti-fascist views, but eventually escaped from Fascist control in January 1945 and returned to the Vatican. In 1947 he returned to China.

From 1959 to 1979, Zhang was imprisoned. In 1980 he returned to Zhangerce Village (张二册村), Gaoling, where he founded a church and a Franciscan convent. He went to Rome for pilgrimage in 1987, where he met the pope. He later told his diocese, the Diocese of Sanyuan, that the pope disproved the masses offered by the Chinese Catholic Patriotic Association. In 1989 he hosted the first conference of China's underground bishops at his parish church, where 10 bishops attended. He was again arrested in December 1989, but was released in June 1990 due to ill health. He visited Italy again in 1992, where Pope John Paul II received him.

Zhang died on 20 March 1997 in Zhangerce Village.

== See also ==
- Catholic Church in Shaanxi
