= Anthony Li Du'an =

Archbishop of Xi'an from 1987 to 2006

The Most Reverend Anthony Li Du'an
- Archbishop of the Roman Catholic Archdiocese of Xi’an
- Native name: 李笃安
- Church: St. Francis Cathedral of Xi'an
- Archdiocese: Roman Catholic Archdiocese of Xi’an
- Installed: 1987
- Term ended: 2006
- Successor: Anthony Dang Mingyan

Orders
- Ordination: 1951
- Consecration: 1987

Personal details
- Born: 1927
- Died: May 25, 2006 (aged 78–79) Xi'an, Shaanxi
- Buried: Lintong, Shaanxi
- Denomination: Catholic

Anthony Li Du'an (simplified Chinese: 李笃安; traditional Chinese: 李篤安; pinyin: Lǐ Dǔ'ān, 1927 – 25 May 2006) was a Chinese Catholic priest and former bishop of the Roman Catholic Archdiocese of Xi'an.

== Biography ==
Li was baptized when he was young. In 1938, he entered Xi'an's seminary. On 11 April 1951, he was ordained, and in the same year, he was appointed as the vice-dean of St. Francis Cathedral, Xi'an.

Li was imprisoned around the time of the Cultural Revolution. However, various sources provide conflicting information about the date of Li's imprisonment. According to Vatican Radio, he was imprisoned during 1954–57, 1958–60, and 1966–79. According to AsiaNews, Li underwent reform through labor in 1960–63 and 1963–79.

In 1980–87, Li was the dean of the Catholic church at Gongyi (公义), Lintong, Shaanxi. In April 1987, Li was elected archbishop of Xi'an through the "self-election and self-consecration" process (自选自圣). During his episcopate, Li led the Xi'an archdiocese to expand to 60 parishes and 20,000 believers.

In November 1987, Li was elected the vice-president of the Catholic Patriotic Association (CPA) of Shaanxi and the commissioner of Shaanxi's Catholic Committee of Religious Affairs (陕西省天主教教务委员会). In May 1990, Li was elected the president of the CPA of Xi'an. In December 1991, when the Shaanxi Catholic Seminary was founded, Li was appointed the inaugural president.

In the final two years of his life, Li had liver cancer. On 25 May 2006 in Xi'an, Li died at the Shaanxi Provincial Cancer Hospital in Xi'an. He was accompanied by the auxiliary bishop, Anthony Dang Mingyan, and other priests and laity. Li was buried on 31 May at the Catholic church of Gongyi, Lintong.

=== Views and activism on China–Holy See relations ===
In 2003, the Pontifical Institute for Foreign Missions published an interview with Li. In the interview, Li acknowledged the papal supremacy, and claimed that the most pressing problem was electing new bishops. He argued for the importance of bishops, and asserted that the Catholic Patriotic Association should be under the leadership of bishops. He believed that it was the best time to evangelize in China, and was confident in younger Chinese bishops.

In 2005, Pope Benedict XVI invited Li and three other Chinese bishops to Rome to attend the Synod on the Eucharist, but the Chinese government did not let them attend. The pope sent ecclesiastical rings to Li and the three other bishops to signify that they were a part of the synod. Li wore the ring when he died in 2006.

On 30 April and 3 May 2006, Li attended the consecration of two bishops in China. Both consecrations were without papal approval. Later in the same year, in an interview with the South China Morning Post, Li acknowledged that he was uncertain whether the consecrations would harm the potential relationship between China and the Holy See. Although he recognized that the consecration of bishops posed a challenge for both parties, he speculated that China and the Vatican could establish diplomatic relations within five years.

Catholic Church titles
Preceded by	Archbishop of Xi'an; 1987–2006	Succeeded by Anthony Dang Mingyan
