= Diocese of Sanyuan =

Roman Catholic diocese in China

Diocese of Sanyuan Dioecesis Saniüenensis 天主教三原教区

Location
- Country: China
- Ecclesiastical province: Xi’an
- Metropolitan: Xi’an

Statistics
- Area: 12,600 km^{2} (4,900 sq mi)
- Population: Total; Catholics: (as of 2010); 4,830,000; 40,000 (0.82%)

Information
- Rite: Latin Rite
- Cathedral: Cathedral of the Sacred Heart of Jesus in Sanyuan, Xianyang

Current leadership
- Pope: Leo XIV
- Bishop: Joseph Han Yingjin
- Metropolitan Archbishop: Anthony Dang Mingyan

The Roman Catholic Diocese of Sanyuan (Latin: Saniüenen(sis), Chinese: 三原; pinyin: Sānyuán) is a diocese located in Sanyuan in the ecclesiastical province of Xi'an, and is centered in the Chinese province of Shaanxi.

== History ==
- November 1, 1931: Established as Apostolic Prefecture of Sanyuan (三原) from the Apostolic Vicariate of Xi’anfu (西安府)
- July 13, 1944: Promoted as Apostolic Vicariate of Sanyuan
- April 11, 1946: Promoted as Diocese of Sanyuan

== Leadership ==
- Bishops of Sanyuan (Roman rite)
  - Bishop Joseph Han Yingjin (since June 24, 2010)
  - Bishop John Chrysostom Lan Shi (2003–2008)
  - Bishop John Bai Ningxian (since May 7, 1997) (possibly an auxiliary bishop)
  - Bishop Joseph Zong Huaide (1985–2003)
  - Bishop Ferdinando Fulgenzio Pasini, O.F.M. (班錫宜) (April 11, 1946–April 17, 1985)
- Vicars Apostolic of Sanyuan (Roman Rite)
  - Bishop Ferdinando Fulgenzio Pasini, O.F.M. (班錫宜) (July 13, 1944–April 11, 1946)
- Prefects Apostolic of Sanyuan (Roman Rite)
  - Fr. Ferdinando Fulgenzio Pasini, O.F.M. (班錫宜) (later Bishop) (June 4, 1932–July 13, 1944)

== See also ==
- Anthony Zhang Gangyi, Franciscan priest of Sanyuan diocese
