= Stefano Xu Hongwei =

Chinese Catholic priest (born 1975)

- Bishop of Hanzhong
- Native name: 胥紅偉
- Church: Cathedral of St. Michael the Archangel in Hanzhong
- Archdiocese: Roman Catholic Archdiocese of Xi'an
- Diocese: Diocese of Hanzhong
- Installed: April 2019
- Predecessor: Louis Yu Runchen

Orders
- Ordination: July 2002
- Consecration: 28 August 2019 by Joseph Ma Yinglin

Personal details
- Born: January 16, 1975 (age 51) Chenggu County, Shaanxi
- Denomination: Roman Catholic
- Education: Pontifical Urban University
- Motto: SERVIRE IN VERITATE ET CARITATE

Stefano Xu Hongwei (simplified Chinese: 胥红伟; traditional Chinese: 胥紅偉; pinyin: Xū Hóngwěi; born 16 January 1975) is a Chinese Catholic priest and Bishop of the Roman Catholic Diocese of Hanzhong since April 2019. He was elected as the Bishop of the Roman Catholic Diocese of Hanzhong, but later reaffirmed his position as associate Bishop when he was ordained in late August 2019.

== Biography ==
Xu was born in Chenggu County, Shaanxi on January 16, 1975. He enrolled at Xi'an Seminary in September 1996. He was ordained a priest in July 2002. In August of the same year he was assigned as parish priest. In July 2004 he pursued advanced studies in Rome, earning a pastoral license from Pontifical Urbanianum University. He arrived in Canada in November 2008 to begin his education at the diocese of Vancouver. In April 2010 he was appointed pastor of West Street Cathedral in the Hantai district. On April 11, 2019, he was chosen as Bishop of the Roman Catholic Diocese of Hanzhong. The motto he chose is: "Servire in Veritate et Caritate". His appointment was approved by the Holy See.

In December 2015 he became a member of the Shaanxi Patriotic Association and Shaanxi Provincial Council of Bishops. In 2012, and in 2017, he was also a member of the Standing Committee of the Chinese People's Consultative Political Conference.

Catholic Church titles
Previous: Louis Yu Runchen	Bishop of the Roman Catholic Diocese of Hanzhong; 2019	Incumbent
