= Bartholomew Yu Chengti =

Chinese bishop (1919–2009)

- Bishop of Hanzhong
- Native name: 余成悌
- Church: Catholic Church
- Diocese: Diocese of Hanzhong
- In office: 11 December 1981 – 2003
- Predecessor: Giuseppe Maggi
- Successor: Louis Yu Runchen

Orders
- Ordination: 23 October 1949
- Consecration: 11 December 1981 by Giuseppe Maggi

Personal details
- Born: 17 August 1919
- Died: 14 September 2009 (aged 90)

Bartholomew Yu Chengti (Chinese: 余成悌; 17 August 1919 – 14 September 2009) was a Chinese clandestine Roman Catholic bishop.

Bishop Yu was born in the Roman Catholic family in 1919. He joined the major theological seminary at the age 17 and was ordained a priest in 1949. He was detained and sent to a forced labour camp in the time of the Cultural Revolution. After the release from camp, he was clandestinely consecrated as bishop of the Roman Catholic Diocese of Hanzhong on December 10, 1981. He served as bishop until 2003. Bishop Yu was never recognised by the Chinese government and never joined the Chinese Patriotic Catholic Association. He was an older brother of another clandestine bishop Matthias Yu Chengxin.
