= John Baptist Yang Xiaoting =

Chinese Catholic priest

Most Reverend John Baptist Yang Xiaoting
- Bishop of Yan'an
- Archdiocese: Roman Catholic Archdiocese of Xi'an
- Diocese: Roman Catholic Diocese of Yan'an
- Installed: 2011
- Predecessor: Francis Tong Hui

Orders
- Ordination: 1991
- Consecration: 15 July 2010 by Bishop Louis Yu Ren Shen (Yu Runchen)

Personal details
- Born: April 9, 1964 (age 62) Zhouzhi County, Shaanxi, China
- Denomination: Roman Catholic
- Education: Pontifical Urban University
- Motto: DEUS CARITAS EST / 天主是愛
- Coat of arms

Chinese name
- Traditional Chinese: 楊曉亭
- Simplified Chinese: 杨晓亭
Transcriptions
Standard Mandarin
- Hanyu Pinyin: Yáng Xiǎotíng

John Baptist Yang Xiaoting (Chinese: 杨晓亭; born April 9, 1964) was a Chinese Catholic priest and Bishop of the Roman Catholic Diocese of Yan'an since 2011.

== Biography ==
Yang was born in Zhouzhi County, Shaanxi, on April 9, 1964. He was ordained a priest on August 28, 1991.

He accepted the episcopacy with the papal mandate on July 15, 2010. On March 25, 2011, after the death of his predecessor, he became bishop of the Yan'an.

In 2010, he was elected vice-chairman of the Bishops Conference of Catholic Church in China (BCCCC). In December 2016 he was elected vice-president of the Catholic Patriotic Association.

In October 2018, Yang attended Mass with Joseph Guo Jincai at St. Peter's Square in the Vatican City, after China and the Vatican signed an interim agreement on the appointment of bishops last month.

Catholic Church titles
Previous: Francis Tong Hui	Bishop of the Roman Catholic Diocese of Yan'an; 2011	Incumbent
