= Fengxiang clay sculpture =

Fengxiang clay sculpture is a folk art form from Liuying village, Fengxiang County, Baoji city, Shaanxi Province. It is called “Ni Huo” by local people. In 2006, the art form was added to China's intangible culture list, and is protected a such.

The sculptures are often sold in markets around the lunar New Year.

== History ==
Fengxiang clay sculpture originated before 221 BCE, during the pre-Qin period, and later thrived during the Ming dynasty (1368-1644). According to local sculptors, the sculptures were originally used as sacrifices, in place of human sacrifices, during the rule of Duke Xian of Qin from 384-362 BCE. In the modern day, they are used as toys and symbols of good fortune and happiness.

The sculptures are made from a special clay called “Ban Ban Tu,” found only in Fengxiang County, northwest of Xi’an. The clay is well-suited for making sculptures because it is very sticky and doesn’t crack easily after it dries. The clay is mixed with pulp, shaped, and then painted. The craft of making the painted clay-figurines of Fengxiang has a recorded history of more than three hundred years. According to folklore, however, the figurines first appeared some six hundred years ago.

== Subjects ==
The subjects of the figurines span a wide range of bold and brief shapes of wild exaggeration and bright colours with a strong local flavour.

Large wall hangings depicting the heads of animals such as tiger and oxen, are another type of clay sculpture. Auspicious designs like peony (wealth), pomegranate (fertility), “Buddha’s hand” (happiness and kindness), lotus (holy symbol of Buddhism), golden fish (surplus), peach (longevity), and fylfot, or swastika (endless happiness) are drawn on its body.

Frog sculptures with the “Five Poisons” is a unique design popular in rural areas. Ancient Chinese generally called the scorpion, centipede, snake, gecko, and toad the “Five Poisons.” The frog is of the same family as the toad in the “Five Poisons.” People put this hanging frog with “Five Poisons” on children’s beds, with their venomous powers, to keep away evil spirits and disaster from children.

Human figurines of historical figures such as Guan Gong are also made.
