= Lucas Li Jing-feng =

Chinese Roman Catholic bishop (1922–2017)

- Bishop of Fengxiang
- Native name: 李镜峰
- Church: Catholic Church
- Diocese: Diocese of Fengxiang
- In office: 14 February 1983 – 17 November 2017
- Predecessor: Anthony Zhou Weidao
- Successor: Peter Li Huiyuan
- Previous post: Coadjutor Bishop of Fengxiang (1980-1983)

Orders
- Ordination: 29 June 1947
- Consecration: 25 April 1980 by Anthony Zhou Weidao

Personal details
- Born: 26 February 1922 Tongyuan Subdistrict, Gaoling, Shaanxi, Republic of China
- Died: 17 November 2017 (aged 95) Fengxiang District, Shaanxi, China

Lucas Li Jing-feng (Chinese: 李镜峰; 26 February 1922 – 17 November 2017) was a Chinese Roman Catholic bishop.

Li was born in Gaoling County in 1922. He was ordained a priest in 1947, and detained in 1959. Shortly after his release in 1980, Li was consecrated as coadjutor bishop of Fengxiang. Three years later, he was named bishop of Fengxiang and served until his death in 2017. The Chinese government formally recognized Li's leadership of Fengxiang in 2004, although he never joined the Chinese Patriotic Catholic Association.
