= Matthias Yu Chengxin =

Chinese bishop (1927–2017)

Matthias Yu Chengxin (Chinese: 余成信; 27 December 1927 – 7 December 2017) was a Chinese clandestine Roman Catholic bishop.

Bishop Yu was born in the Roman Catholic family in 1927. He joined the theological seminary, but was forced to interrupt his studies and in the time of the Cultural Revolution was detained and sent to a forced labour camp. After the release from camp, he was ordained a priest in 1981. He was clandestinely consecrated as coadjutor bishop (or an auxiliary bishop) of Hanzhong on December 12, 1989, shortly after arrest of his brother, bishop Bartholomew Yu Chengti. He served as bishop until 2007. Bishop Yu was never recognised by the Chinese government and never joined the Chinese Patriotic Catholic Association.
