= Lorenzo Maria Balconi =

Italian archbishop, missionary and writer (1878-1969)

The Most Reverend Lorenzo Maria Balconi
- Vicar Apostolic of Hanzhong
- Appointed: 28 February 1928
- Term ended: March 1934

Orders
- Ordination: 22 December 1900 by Andrea Carlo Ferrari
- Consecration: 17 May 1928 by Flaminio Belotti

Personal details
- Born: 4 August 1878 Milan, Kingdom of Italy
- Died: 10 April 1969 (aged 90) Milan, Italy
- Denomination: Catholic Church

Lorenzo Maria Balconi (4 August 1878 – 10 April 1969) was an Italian archbishop of the Catholic Church, missionary, and writer.

== Early life ==
Lorenzo Maria Balconi was born on 4 August 1878 in Milan. He entered the Pontifical Institute for Foreign Missions (PIME) in Milan at the age of 20, and two years later, on 22 December 1900, was ordained a priest by Cardinal Andrea Carlo Ferrari, the Archbishop of Milan.

In 1901, at the age of 23, he left for China, beginning a mission in Nanyang, Henan. On his return to Italy, he brought several historical artifacts, such as gold coins from Imperial China, which were housed in the PIME museum in Milan.

== Episcopate ==
On 18 February 1928, Pope Pius XI appointed Balconi the Vicar Apostolic of Hanzhong and the Titular Bishop of Mylasa. On 17 May, he was ordained to the episcopacy by Bishop Flaminio Belotti. In March 1934, he resigned the office of vicar apostolic, and assumed in a ceremony in Hong Kong the position of Superior General of the Pontifical Institute for Foreign Missions, being appointed by Pius XI.

On 3 August 1939, Pope Pius XII appointed him Titular Archbishop of Hierapolis in Phrygia. He returned to Italy to direct PIME, and assumed the responsibility of founding the Missionaries of the Immaculate Conception. In his later years, he followed the activities of the order, and died in Milan on 10 April 1969.

Catholic Church titles
Preceded by Antonio Maria Capettini	Vicar Apostolic of Hanzhong; 1928–1934	Succeeded by Mario Civelli
Preceded by Francis Martin Kelly	— TITULAR — Bishop of Mylasa; 1928–1939	Succeeded by John Francis O'Hara
New office	Superior General of the Pontifical Institute for Foreign Missions; 1934–1947	Succeeded by Aristide Pirovano
Preceded by Alban Goodier	— TITULAR — Archbishop of Hierapolis in Phrygia; 1939–1969	Vacant
