= Joseph Tong Changping =

Chinese bishop (born 1968)

- Bishop of the Apostolic Prefecture of Tongzhou
- Province: Shaanxi
- Diocese: Apostolic Prefecture of Tongzhou
- Installed: 4 November 2002
- Predecessor: Lawrence Zhang Wenbin

Orders
- Ordination: 6 January 1997

Personal details
- Born: 6 December 1968 (age 57) Weinan, Shaanxi, China
- Denomination: Roman Catholic

Joseph Tong Changping (simplified Chinese: 同长平; traditional Chinese: 同長平; pinyin: Tóng Chángpíng; born 6 December 1968) is a Chinese Catholic priest and has served as the Bishop of the Apostolic Prefecture of Tongzhou since 2002.

== Biography ==
Tong was born on 6 December 1968, in Weinan, Shaanxi. From 1991 to 1994, he studied theology and philosophy at the Seminary of Xi'an Archdiocese. He continued to study law and political science at Shaanxi Academy of Political Science. On 6 January 1997, at the age of 29, he was ordained a priest. After being ordained, he became a professor of law at the diocesan seminary. He was also a superior priest and spiritual director in the Apostolic Prefecture of Tongzhou. On 4 November 2002, he was ordained a bishop by Bishop Lawrence Zhang Wenbin. Despite being ordained by a bishop illegally, the Holy See still recognized his episcopal office and appointed him Bishop of the Apostolic Prefecture of Tongzhou. His episcopal ordination was held in December 2003.

Catholic Church titles
Previous: Lawrence Zhang Wenbin	Bishop of the Apostolic Prefecture of Tongzhou; 2002	Incumbent
