= Louis Yu Runchen =

Chinese Catholic priest and bishop (born 1931)

- Bishop Emeritus of Hanzhong
- Church: Roman Catholic
- Archdiocese: Xi'an
- Diocese: Roman Catholic Diocese of Hanzhong
- Installed: 1986
- Term ended: April 2019
- Predecessor: Bartholomew Yu Chengti
- Successor: Stefano Xu Hongwei

Orders
- Ordination: December 8, 1957
- Consecration: 1986

Personal details
- Born: December 1, 1931 (age 94) Shaanxi, China
- Denomination: Roman Catholic

Louis Yu Runchen (simplified Chinese: 余润深; traditional Chinese: 余潤深; pinyin: Yú Rùnshēn; born December 1, 1931) is a Chinese Roman Catholic prelate, who served as a bishop of the Roman Catholic Diocese of Hanzhong between 1986 and 2019.

== Biography ==
Yu was born in Shaanxi on December 1, 1931. He was ordained a priest on December 8, 1957. In 1985, he was nominated by the Catholic Patriotic Association to serve as the Bishop of the Roman Catholic Diocese of Hanzhong. His episcopal ordination was held on November 30, 1986. In 1984, the Holy See appointed Bartholomew Yu Chengti as Bishop of the Roman Catholic Diocese of Hanzhong. The ordination of Bishop Louis Yu Runchen was carried out without the approval of the Holy See. Therefore, from 1986 to 2003, the Roman Catholic Diocese of Hanzhong had two main bishops at the same time. In 2003, Bishop Bartholomew Yu Chengti resigned for health reasons. Yu became the ruler of the Roman Catholic Diocese of Hanzhong. In 2004, he was elected a member of the Standing Committee of the Chinese Catholic Bishops' Conference. In 2009 after Bishop Bartholomew Yu Chengti died, the Holy See recognized Yu's position as Bishop of the Roman Catholic Diocese of Hanzhong. In April 2019, Stefano Xu Hongwei replaced him as new bishop of the Roman Catholic Diocese of Hanzhong. Stefano Xu Hongwei's appointment was approved by the Holy See and the Communist government.

Catholic Church titles
Previous: Bartholomew Yu Chengti	Bishop of the Roman Catholic Diocese of Hanzhong; 1986–2019	Next: Stefano Xu Hongwei
