= Catholic Church in Zhifang =

Catholic church in Zhifang, China

Catholic Church in Zhifang was the only Catholic church in Zhifang, a village near Xi'an, in Shaanxi province. On December 27, 2017, it was torn down by authorities. The church was located near the Beijing-Kunming highway and had been in constant use since it was built in 1999. Local Catholics used social media to show official documents that approved the church for worship with one document showing that local officials had given the church permission to use the land for building purposes.

== See also ==
- Catholic Church in Shaanxi
