= Peter Li Huiyuan =

- Bishop of Fengxiang
- Native name: 李会元
- Church: Catholic Church
- Diocese: Diocese of Fengxiang
- Installed: 17 November 2017
- Predecessor: Lucas Li Jing-feng
- Previous post: Coadjutor Bishop of Fengxiang (2014-2017)

Orders
- Ordination: 19 March 1991
- Consecration: 13 February 2014 by Lucas Li Jing-feng

Personal details
- Born: 10 October 1965 (age 60)

Peter Li Huiyuan (Chinese: 李会元; born 10 October 1965) is the current bishop of the Diocese of Fengxiang in Shaanxi, China.

== Episcopate ==
Li Huiyuan was formerly part of the clandestine underground Chinese Catholic church and he served as the coadjutor bishop for Lucas Li Jing-feng of the same diocese prior to the latter's death in 2017. He was officially recognized by the Holy See for this position since 2015. Bishop Lucas Li had tried to pave the way for a transition of the diocese from underground to official status prior to his death and the Chinese authorities engaged in cooperation with him for this purpose.

After Bishop Lucas Li died in 2017, Li Huiyuan gained effective control of the diocese. In 2020, he gained official government approval as the bishop of Fengxiang in a ceremony attended by several other bishops, and thus became part of the government-recognized Catholic church in China.
