= Shaanxi Normal University =

Public university in Xi'an, Shaanxi, China

Coordinates: 34.1591°N 108.9029°E

- 陕西师范大学
- Type: Public
- Established: 1944; 82 years ago
- President: You Xuqun (游旭群)
- Academic staff: 1,752
- Undergraduates: 17,502
- Postgraduates: 17,343
- Other students: 66,034
- Location: 199 South Chang'an Road, Xi'an, Shaanxi, 710062, China
- Website: snnu.edu.cn

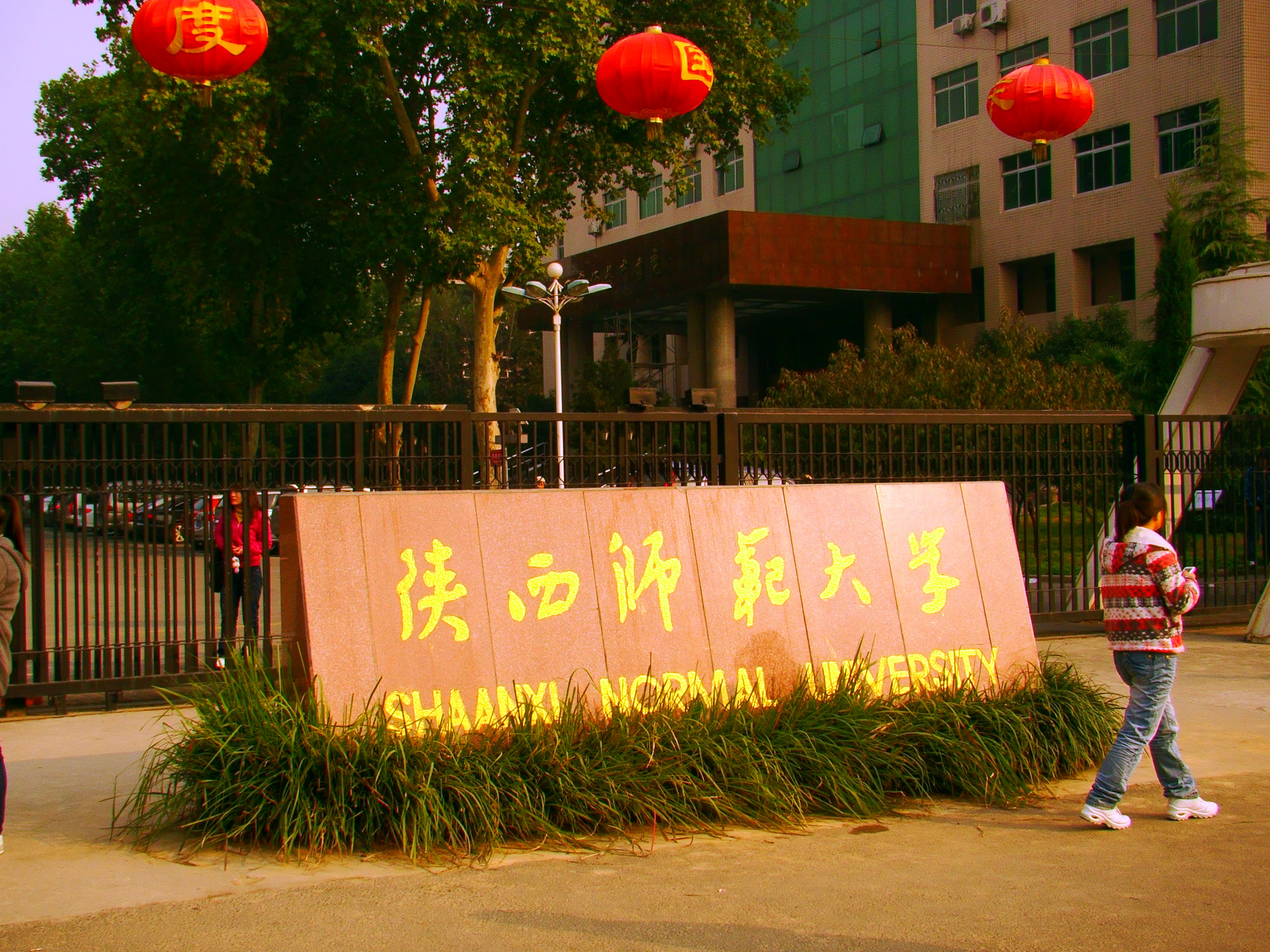
Main entrance of the SNNU Yanta campus

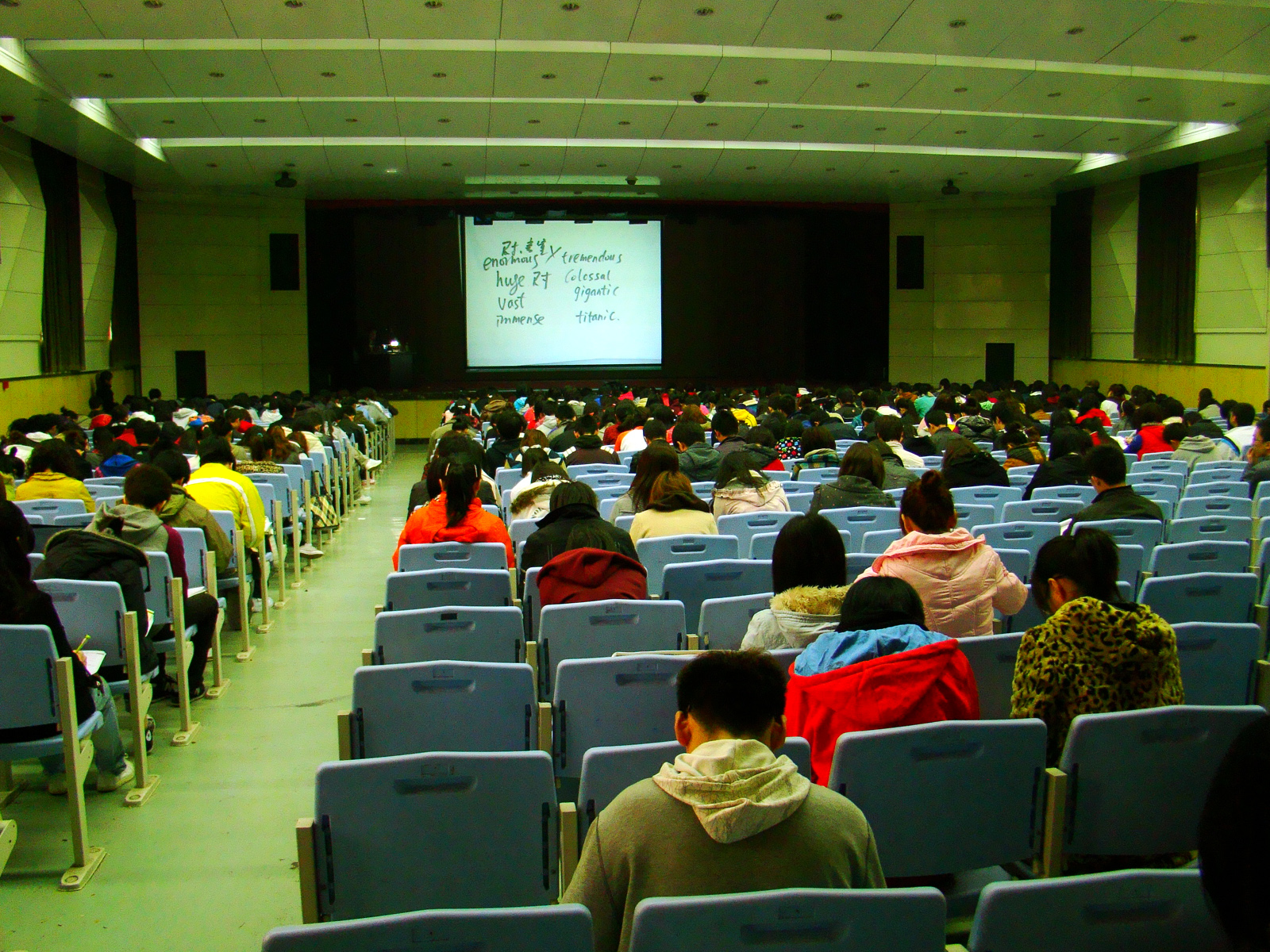
SNNU's Audimax facility

Shaanxi Normal University (SNNU; 陕西师范大学) is a public university in Chang'an District, Xi'an, Shaanxi, China. It is affiliated with the Ministry of Education. The university is part of the Double First-Class Construction and Project 211.

In 1960, then Xi'an Teachers College (西安师范学院) and then Shaanxi Teachers College (陕西师范学院) merged to form the provincial Shaanxi Normal University. In 1978, it was transferred to the Ministry of Education for management.

== Colleges ==
- Department of Humanities and Social Sciences
- Department of Science and Engineering
- College of Political Economy
- College of Chinese Literature
- College of History & Civilization
- College of Education
- College of Psychology
- College of Foreign Languages
- College of Continuing Education
- College of Physics & Information Technology
- College of Chemistry & Materials Science
- College of Life Sciences
- College of Tourism & Environment
- College of Sport
- College of News and Media
- College of Computer Science
- College of Music
- College of Fine Arts
- College of International Business
- International College of Chinese Studies
- Department of Minority Studies
- College of Distance Education
- College of Mathematics & Information Science
- College of Food Engineering & Nutritional Science
- College of Teachers' & Administrators' Training
