= Francis Tong Hui =

Chinese clandestine Roman Catholic bishop (1933–2016)

Francis Tong Hui (15 August 1933 – 27 October 2016) was a Chinese clandestine Roman Catholic bishop.

Tong Hui was born in Lintong District in 1933 and was clandestinely ordained to the priesthood on 23 December 1956.

Tong was sentenced to 15 years of hard labour in March 1965 and freed in January 1980. He was coadjutor bishop of the Roman Catholic Diocese of Yan’an from 1992 and was consecrated in 1994. He served as a diocesan bishop the same Diocese from 1999 to 2011.

== Notes ==
Catholic Church titles
| Previous: Pacific Li Huan-de | Bishop of the Roman Catholic Diocese of Yan'an; 1999-2011 | Next: John Baptist Yang Xiaoting |
