= Diocese of Fengxiang =

Latin Catholic territory in China

Diocese of Fengxiang Dioecesis Fomsiamensis 天主教凤翔教区
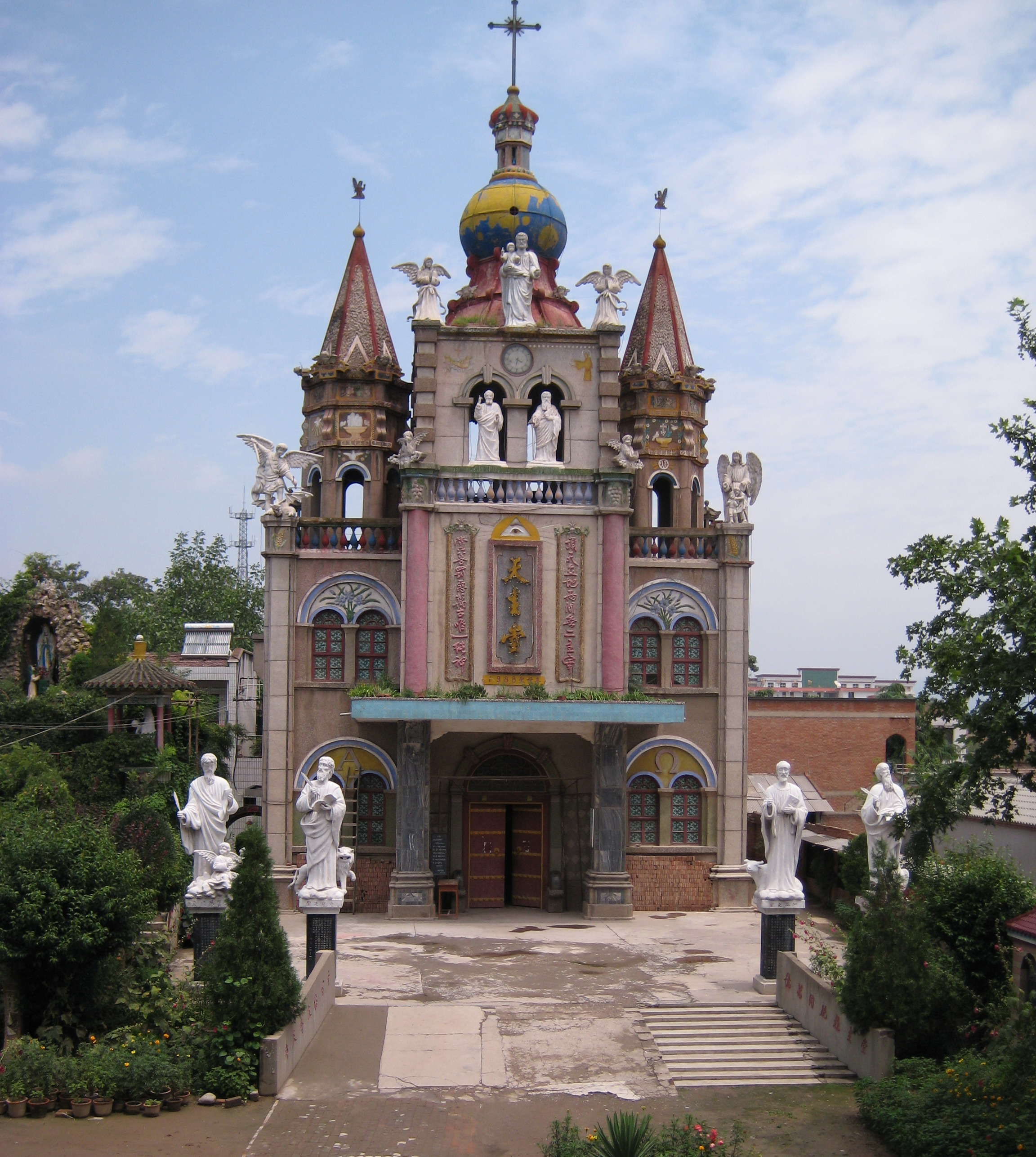
- Cathedral of St Joseph in Fengxiang

Location
- Country: China
- Ecclesiastical province: Xi’an

Statistics
- Area: 12,000 km^{2} (4,600 sq mi)
- Population: Total; Catholics: (as of 1950); 1,000,000; 8,504 (0.9%)

Information
- Denomination: Catholic Church
- Sui iuris church: Latin Church
- Rite: Roman Rite
- Cathedral: Cathedral of St Joseph in Fengxiang

Current leadership
- Pope: Leo XIV
- Bishop: Peter Li Hui-yuan
- Metropolitan Archbishop: Anthony Dang Mingyan

The Diocese of Fengxiang (Latin: Fomsiamen(sis), Chinese: 鳳翔) is a Latin Church ecclesiastical jurisdiction or diocese if the Catholic Church located in Fengxiang (Shaanxi), China. It is a suffragan diocese in the ecclesiastical province of the metropolitan Archdiocese of Xi’an.

It is believed that this diocese, headed by Bishop Luke Li Jingfeng until his death late in 2017, is the only one in China where neither the laity nor the bishop belong to the government-sponsored Chinese Patriotic Catholic Association. Since 2017, the bishop has been Peter Li Huiyuan.

== History ==
- November 15, 1932: Established as Apostolic Prefecture of Fengxiangfu 鳳翔府 from the Apostolic Vicariate of Xi’anfu 西安府
- June 9, 1942: Promoted as Apostolic Vicariate of Fengxiangfu 鳳翔府
- April 11, 1946: Promoted as Diocese of Fengxiang 鳳翔

== Leadership ==
- Prefects Apostolic of Fengxiangfu 鳳翔府
  - Fr. Philip Silvester Wang Tao-nan, O.F.M. (王道南) (later Bishop) (October 26, 1933 – June 9, 1942)
- Vicars Apostolic of Fengxiangfu 鳳翔府
  - Bishop Philip Silvester Wang Tao-nan, O.F.M. (王道南) (June 9, 1942 – April 11, 1946)
- Bishops of Fengxiang 鳳翔
  - Bishop Philip Silvester Wang Tao-nan, O.F.M. (王道南) (April 11, 1946 – October 4, 1949)
  - Bishop Anthony Zhou Wei-dao, O.F.M. (周維道) (May 31, 1950 – 1979)
  - Bishop Lucas Li Jing-feng (1983 – November 17, 2017)
  - Bishop Peter Li Huiyuan (November 17, 2017 – present)
