= Diocese of Zhouzhi =

Roman Catholic diocese in China

Diocese of Zhouzhi Dioecesis Ceucevensis 天主教盩厔教区

Location
- Country: China
- Ecclesiastical province: Xi’an
- Metropolitan: Xi’an

Statistics
- Population: Total; Catholics: (as of 1950); 920,000; 23,397-60,000

Information
- Rite: Latin Rite
- Cathedral: Cathedral of the Immaculate Heart of Mary in Zhouzhi

Current leadership
- Pope: Leo XIV
- Bishop: Joseph Wu Qinjing
- Metropolitan Archbishop: Anthony Dang Mingyan

The Roman Catholic Diocese of Zhouzhi/Chowchich (Latin: Ceuceven(sis); Chinese: 盩厔) is a diocese located in Zhouzhi (Shaanxi) in the ecclesiastical province of Xi’an in China.

== History ==
- June 17, 1932: Established as the Apostolic Prefecture of Zhouzhi 盩厔 from the Apostolic Vicariate of Xi’anfu 西安府
- May 10, 1951: Promoted as Diocese of Zhouzhi 盩厔

== Leadership ==
- Bishops of Zhouzhi 盩厔 (Roman rite)
  - Bishop Joseph Wu Qinjing (2005–present)
  - Bishop Alphonsus Yang Guang-yan (1995 - 2005)
  - Bishop Paul Fan Yu-fei (1982 - 1984)
  - Bishop Louis Li Bo-yu (李伯漁) (May 10, 1951 – February 8, 1980)
- Prefects Apostolic of Zhouzhi 盩厔 (Roman Rite)
  - Fr. John Gao Zheng-yi (Kao) (高正一) (May 30, 1941 – 1951)
  - Fr. John Zhang Zhi-nan (Tchang) (張指南) (June 14, 1932 – 1940)
