= St. Francis Cathedral, Xi'an =

St. Francis Cathedral
- Wuxing Street Catholic Church
- 圣方济各主教座堂
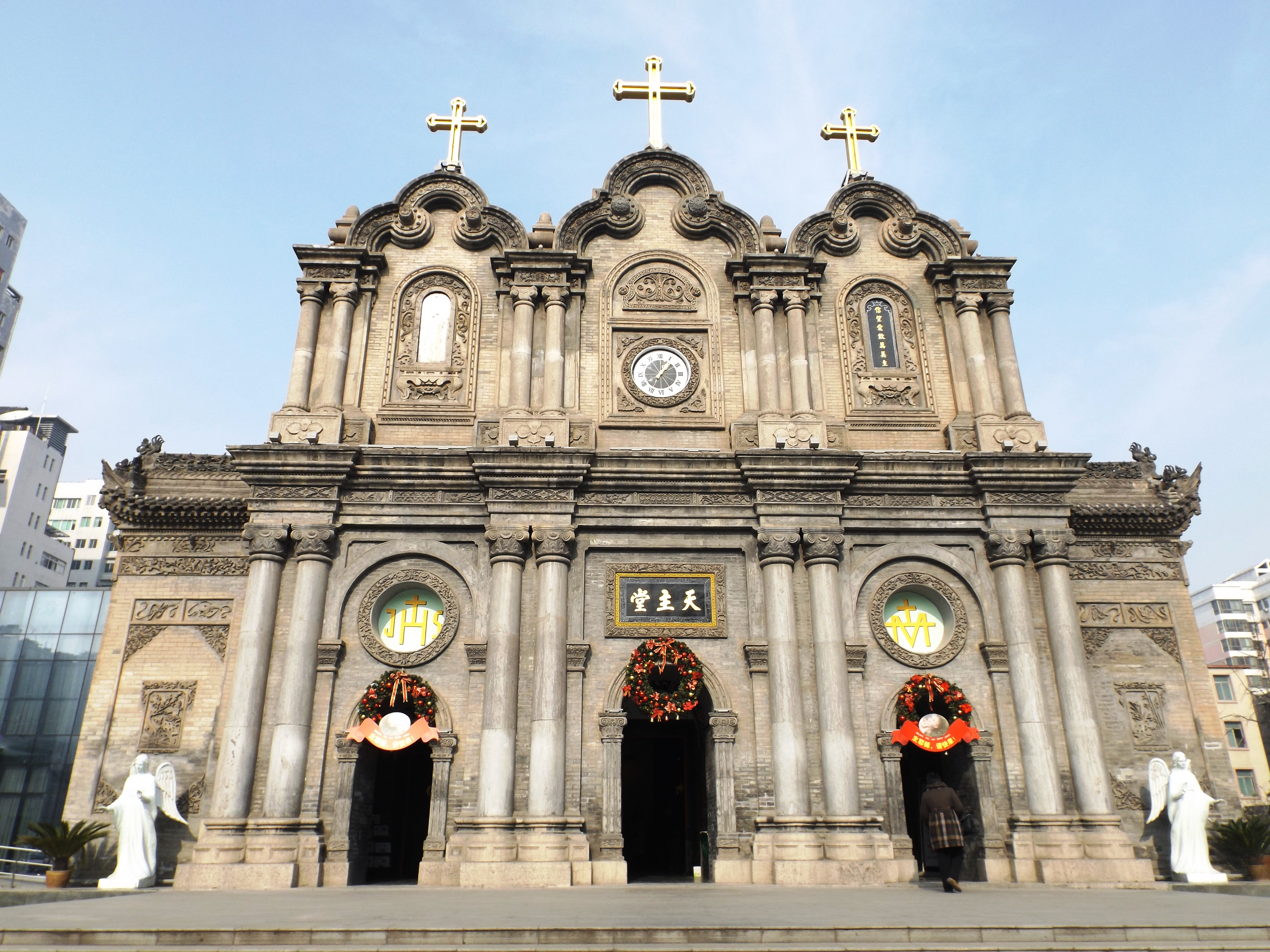
- The front facade of the cathedral in 2016
- St. Francis Cathedral
- 34°15′28″N 108°55′45″E
- Location: 17 Wuxing St, Lianhu, Xi'an
- Country: China
- Denomination: Roman Catholic

History
- Founded: 1716
- Founder: Antonio Laghi
- Dedication: St. Francis of Assisi

Architecture
- Style: Neo-Romanesque
- Years built: 1716 (first building); 1883 (current)

Administration
- Archdiocese: Roman Catholic Archdiocese of Xi'an

Clergy
- Bishop: Anthony Dang Mingyan

St. Francis Cathedral, Xi'an
- Traditional Chinese: 聖方濟各主教座堂
- Simplified Chinese: 圣方济各主教座堂
- Literal meaning: Saint Francis Cathedral
Transcriptions
Standard Mandarin
- Hanyu Pinyin: Shèng fāng jì gè zhǔ jiào zuò táng

St. Francis Cathedral (simplified Chinese: 圣方济各主教座堂; traditional Chinese: 聖方濟各主教座堂) is a Catholic cathedral located in Xi'an, Shaanxi, China. Its construction began in 1716 and was completed in 1727. Since 1930, the church has been the cathedral of the Roman Catholic Archdiocese of Xi'an.

The church has a history of land disputes with various Chinese governments that has continued into the 21st century. Though the Qing government proscribed Christianity in 1724, some underground missionary activities remained, and the church was completed three years later. It was eventually confiscated by the Qing government, but returned in 1866 and rebuilt in 1884. It was closed in 1966 and reopened in 1980.

The cathedral combines Chinese and western architectural styles. It currently houses the Sisters of the Sacred Heart of Jesus and the Yellow River Soup Kitchen, and also contains a relic of St. Francis of Assisi.

== Naming ==
In English, the cathedral is known as "St. Francis Cathedral". Other variations include "Cathedral of St. Francis" and "Francis of Assisi Cathedral". The Chinese government calls the cathedral "Wuxing Street Catholic Church" (五星街天主教堂) in reference to its address.

The cathedral is sometimes also known as Nan Tang (Chinese: 南堂; pinyin: Nán táng; lit. 'Southern Church / Cathedral') in Chinese because it is to the south of another older Catholic church in Xi'an. The U.S. Congressional-Executive Commission on China called it "South Cathedral" in one of their reports, and The Washington Post called it the "Southern Cathedral".

== History ==
=== Qing dynasty ===
==== Founding ====
According to History of Shaanxi: Religious History (陕西省志·宗教志), Catholicism first entered Shaanxi when the Italian missionary Giulio Aleni visited the province in 1620. In 1696, the Holy See made Shaanxi an apostolic vicariate and appointed Basilio Brollo, a Franciscan, as its first apostolic vicar. In 1704, Antonio Laghi, also a Franciscan, became apostolic administrator after Brollo's death.

In 1716, Laghi instructed an Italian missionary known in Chinese as Daidi Ma (马戴第) to purchase a piece of land at Tudimiao Shizi (Chinese: 土地庙十字; lit. 'Tudi temple crossing') in Xi'an and build the St. Francis cathedral. It was completed in 1727. (Note: It is unclear how much involvement Italian missionary Francesco Saraceni had in the expansion of the church. According to Sun Junhua, Saraceni also expanded the original church building between 1765 and 1785. However, History of Shaanxi indicates that he had died in 1741.)

Beginning in January 1724, Emperor Yongzheng banned Christianity in China. He banished all foreign missionaries in October of that year. However, some church activities remained hidden and continued for some time. Laghi was expelled to Guangdong, but managed to come back to Xi'an secretly and died at the church in 1727, the year when the church was completed. Another Franciscan priest at Xi'an, Francesco Saraceni, also hid and was not banished. However, churches were gradually closed in the Qing Empire. The Xi'an church was confiscated by the government and turned into a civil property, and the local officials eventually sold the church building to three households.

==== Return, rebuild, restoration ====
In 1860, the French required the Qing government to return all confiscated Catholic properties under the Convention of Peking. Many of the confiscated churches had either disappeared or were repurposed. According to Liu Xiang, the Qing government, still distrustful of foreign missionaries, reluctantly offered other properties as compensation to the Catholic missions.

When the convention was signed, the cathedral was being used as the family home of the late Zhang Danan (张大枏). In consideration of this, Liu Rong (刘蓉), the Xunfu of Shaanxi, offered the Catholic mission a mosque and five other houses instead of the church building. From 1862 to 1865, Chiais and his auxiliary Amato Pagnucci, unaware that the Zhang family was living in the cathedral, negotiated with the Shaanxi government for the return of the original building. In 1866, after pressure from the French envoy to China and the Qing imperial court, the Shaanxi government returned the church to the Catholic mission and paid 10,000 taels of silver to the widowed mother of Zhang.

In 1883, on the grounds of the Zhang residence, Pagnucci built a new church building on the site with an area of 700 m^{2} (7,500 sq ft). From 1906 to 1908, the apostolic vicar Atanasio Goethe restored and furnished the church. Goethe died of malaria in 1908 and was buried at the cathedral.

=== Republic of China ===
In 1930, the apostolic vicar Fiorenzo Umberto Tessiatore decided to move the seat of the vicariate from Tongyuanfang Catholic Church, Gaoling, to St. Francis Church in Xi'an. Thus the church became a cathedral. In 1946, the apostolic vicariate of Xi'an became an archdiocese.

=== People's Republic of China ===
During the Cultural Revolution, most churches in Shaanxi were closed down and many of the clergy were arrested. The cathedral was appropriated by the Xi'an Candy Factory (Chinese: 西安糖果厂; pinyin: Xī'ān tángguóchǎng). Its accessory buildings were demolished and the cathedral was used as a warehouse.

In 1980, China's State Council instructed the Chinese government to return buildings confiscated from religious bodies during the Cultural Revolution, and the cathedral re-opened. In 1989, the cathedral underwent restoration funded by China's State Administration for Religious Affairs and the Xi'an People's Government. The diocese funded another round of restoration in 2004.

==== Land dispute and attack on nuns in 2005 ====
The Xi'an government did not return the primary school to the Catholic church as they believed the government needed to take over all basic education functions. The local education bureau then closed the primary school in 2003 and sold the land to a developer. The church sued in an attempt to prevent this, asserting its ownership of the land. The State Council passed new regulations on 1 March 2005 that guaranteed "additional protection of religious property", but it did not address the unreturned religious properties.

On 23 November, the electricity of the cathedral was cut off, and a crew began to demolish the neighboring primary school at night. Thirty to forty nuns of the Sisters of the Sacred Heart of Jesus, a religious order affiliated with the cathedral, tried to prevent further demolition to the wall between the cathedral and the school, but about 40 men in black attacked them, "knocking them down and beating them with clubs and sticks." Sixteen nuns were injured and at least five were hospitalized.

On the following Sunday, 27 November, about 600 Xi'an Catholic parishioners carried banners and marched in protest. They only dispersed after officials promised to solve the problem. Mario Mauro, then a Vice-President of the European Parliament, issued a statement saying that European institutions "must quit basing its relations with China solely on the criteria of developing economic trade" and call for religious freedom in China. Maurizio Lupi and 39 other Italian parliamentarians also urged the Italian government to protest formally.

According to The Washington Post, the Chinese government did not issue any formal statements. A police official of Xi'an declined to comment on the attack and Chinese state media did not report on it. However, on 29 November, the government proposed compensating each injured nun with 3000 yuan and offering to let the cathedral buy the land for 6.5 million yuan. Anthony Dang Mingyan, then the auxiliary bishop of Xi'an, accepted the offer.

On 30 November, the Holy See issued a statement expressing "grief and disapproval" over the attack, saying "The violence committed in Xian against several defenseless nuns can only be firmly condemned."

==== Recent history ====
In 2008, Shaanxi government listed the cathedral as a province-level heritage protected site (省级文物保护单位), under the "Important Modern Historical Sites and Representative Architecture" (近现代重要史迹和代表性建筑) group. According to the order, no one may "conduct illegal engineering construction" within the protected premises.

On 24 March 2016, Joachim Gauck, then President of Germany, visited the cathedral and talked with the archbishop of Xi'an, Anthony Dang Mingyan. Gauck himself was a pastor of the Evangelical Lutheran Church of Mecklenburg from 1965 to 1990. According to Deutsche Welle, he sought to strengthen ties with China and address human rights with his visit.

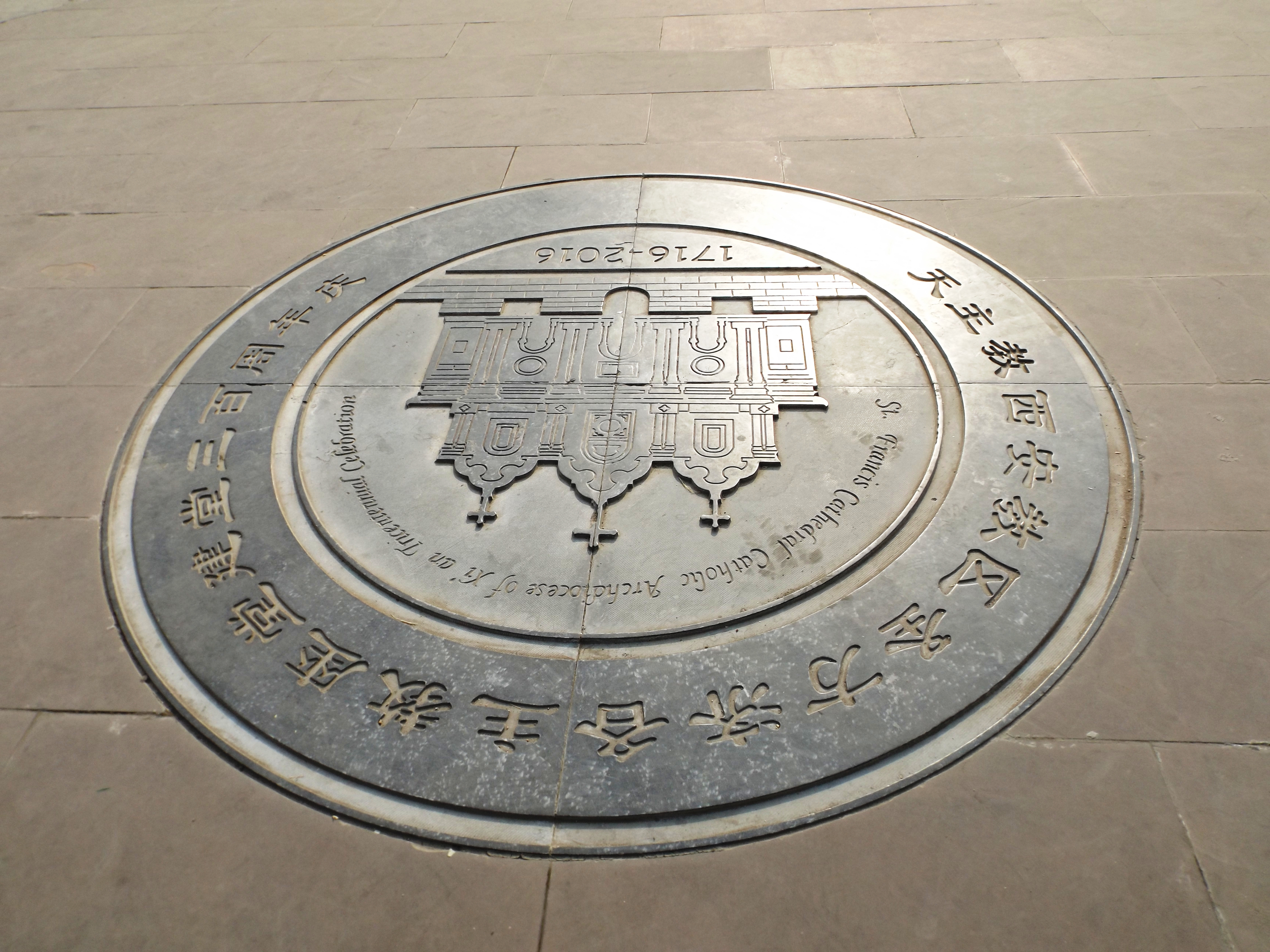
A seal commemorating the 300th anniversary of the church's founding

From 1 October to 4 October 2016, the cathedral hosted an event celebrating the 300th anniversary of its founding, hosted by Archbishop Mingyan. On 2 October, there were two lectures on the church histories in China and in Shaanxi. On 4 October, the feast day of St. Francis of Assisi, a relic of the saint was installed. The Union of Catholic Asian News reported that events of such scale is rare in China due to governmental restrictions.

In 2020, local government officials intended to take the church land on either sides of the cathedral, demolish the buildings, and build a local park. There were rumors that the government would demolish the cathedral itself as well. Radio Free Asia reported that some Catholics held a banner outside of the cathedral that says "protect the legal rights of the church." Archbishop Anthony Dang Mingyan denied the rumors.

== Architecture ==
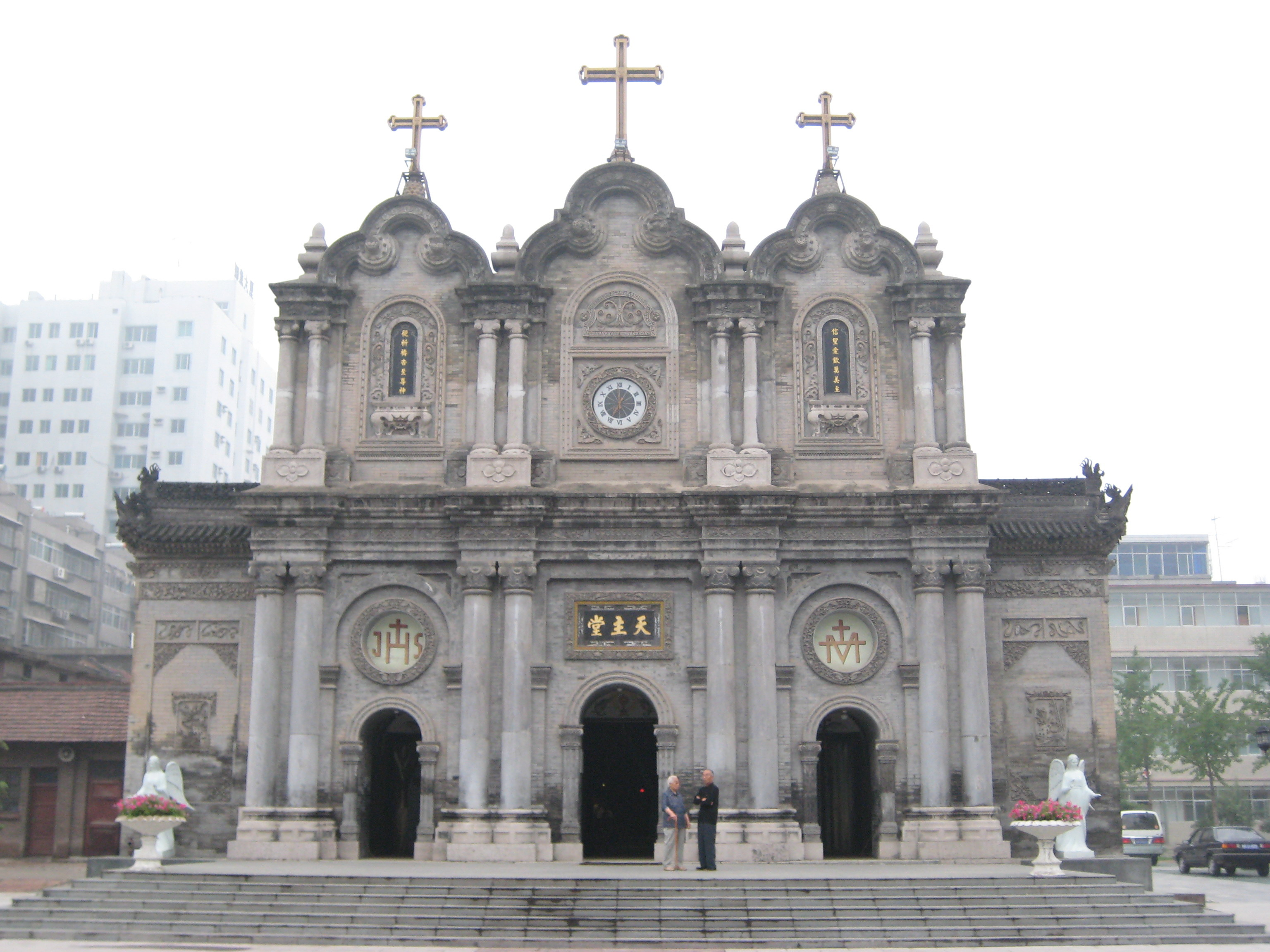
The cathedral's facade in July 2008

=== Exterior ===
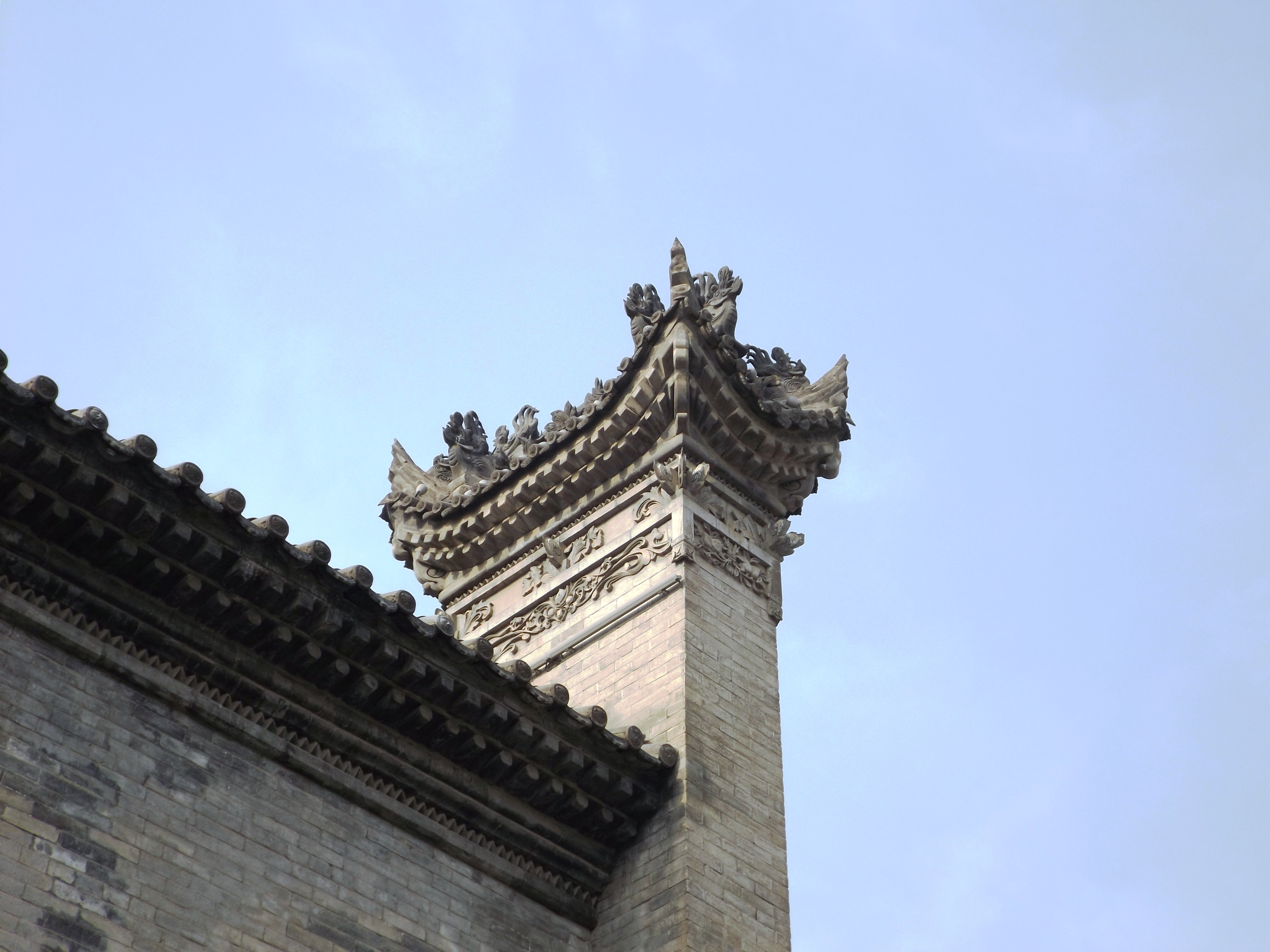
A corner of the cathedral showing detailed brick carvings with traditional Chinese patterns, 2016

The current cathedral was rebuilt in 1883. It is about 17.45 m (57.3 ft) tall. It covers an area of about 700 m^{2} (7,500 sq ft). It has a neo-Romanesque structure, and combines western styles with traditional Chinese brick-and-timber architecture. Yang Haozhong et al. argue that the fusion of Chinese and Western styles was due to the foreign missionaries' lack of professional design skills, as well as the preference of local artisans for using native materials.

The Baroque facade has three arched entrances. It is decorated with brick carvings featuring traditional Chinese patterns, including flowers and Taotie. On the facade, there are 16 granite Ionian columns, and the top of the columns are decorated with flowers. During the 1991 restoration, the columns on the facade were painted black. The black paint was removed in the 2004 restoration.

On the upper part of the facade, there is an electronic clock. There are three aluminum crosses on top of the facade that were installed in 1991 to replace originals that were destroyed during the Cultural Revolution.

During the Cultural Revolution, factory buildings were built in the courtyard of the cathedral. In 2004, the factory buildings were demolished.

=== Interior ===
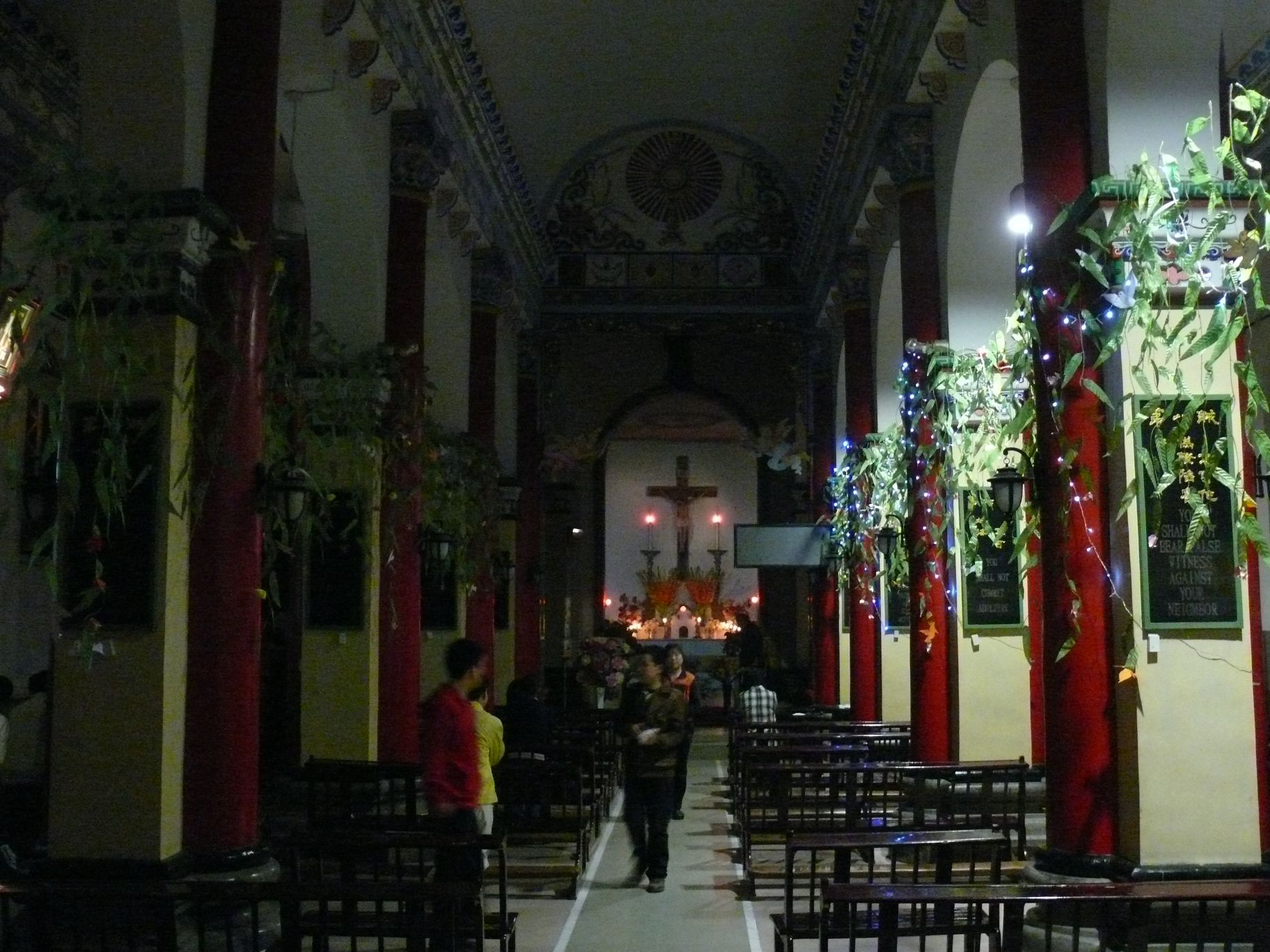
The nave of the cathedral

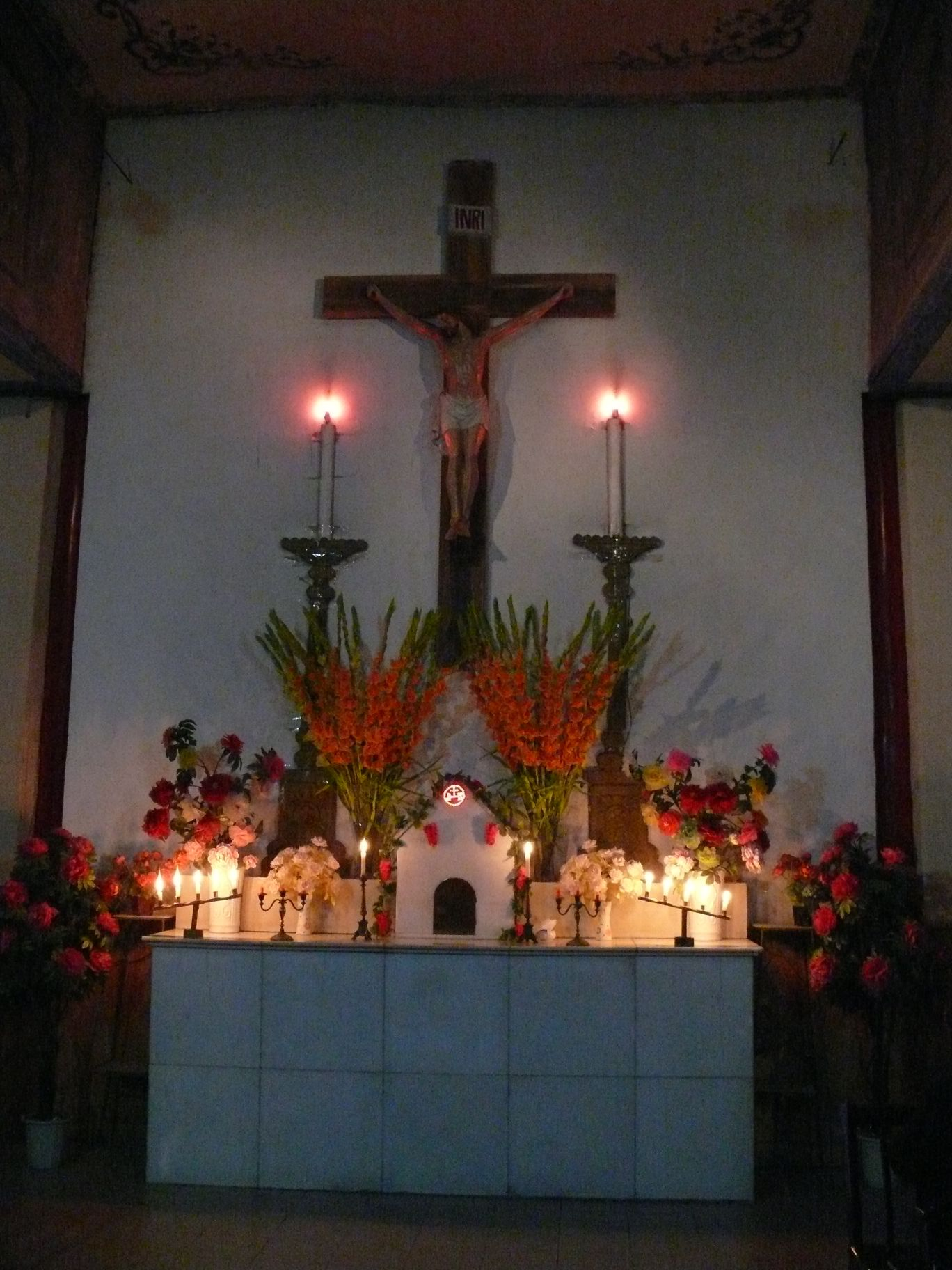
The high altar

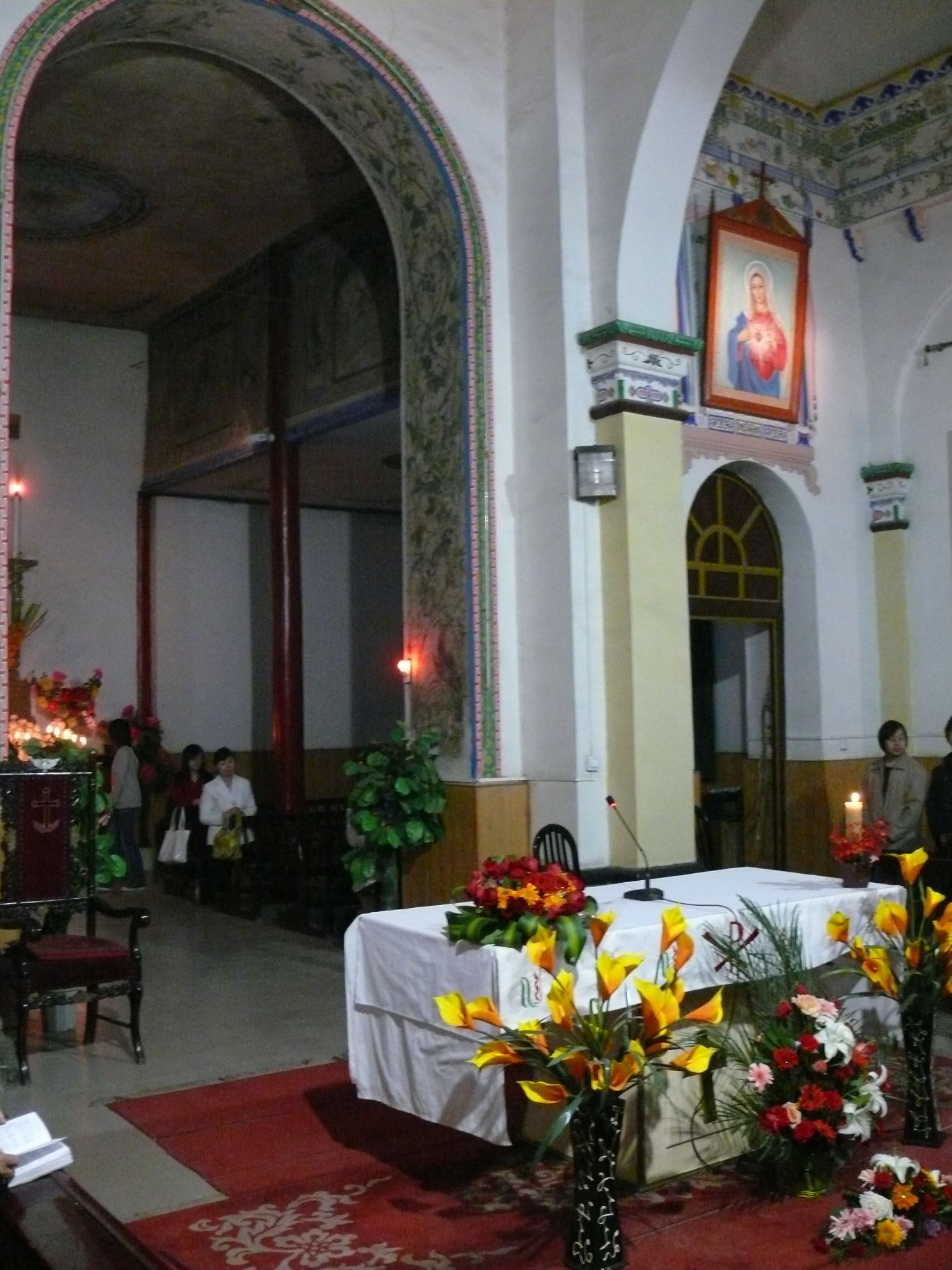
A corner of the cathedral

The interior of the cathedral has a depth of 41 m (135 ft). The cathedral has a capacity of about 500 people. The space is divided into a wide nave in the middle and two narrow aisles on the sides. The nave and the aisles are separated by a continuous sequence of Corinthian pillars. On the top of the main entrance, there is a choir loft.

At the end of the nave there are two altars: a high altar and an altar table. The high altar holds the tabernacle below the crucifix. An icon of St. Francis of Assisi is above the altar table. On each aisle, there is a smaller altar and a confessional.

During the 1991 restoration, wooden wainscots were added to the interior walls. In 2004, the walls were repainted and original murals restored.

== Affiliated organizations ==
In 1919, the apostolic vicariate founded the Rosary Woman's Secondary School (玫瑰女子中学) and the Rosary Woman's Primary School (玫瑰女子小学) on church grounds. In 1928, St. Joseph's Primary School (若瑟小学) was founded in the yard of the church. In 1951, the Xi'an government took over the three schools.

In 1923, the Sisters of the Sacred Heart of Jesus of the Third Order of Saint Francis (方济各第三会耶稣圣心修女会) was founded. Its charters were written by Wang Wenqing (王文清), a nun of the French-led Franciscan Missionaries of Mary who sought to establish a Chinese-led religious order. It was founded under the support of Eugenio Massi, the apostolic vicar of Taiyuan, who was the acting apostolic vicar of Xi'an after Gabriel Maurice resigned. In 1928, the main convent of the order was moved to St. Francis' Church.

In December 2005, an English man named Tony Day founded the "Yellow River Soup Kitchen" at the cathedral. According to The Lancashire Evening Post, it was the first soup kitchen in China. A year and a half later, the cathedral helped build a dedicated center for the organization.

== See also ==
- Catholic Church in Shaanxi
- Roman Catholicism in China
- List of cathedrals in China
- History of Xi'an
- Francis of Assisi, the patron saint of the cathedral
