= Fengxiang District =

Subdivision of Baoji, China

Coordinates: 34°33′36″N 107°25′14″E

Fengxiang District 凤翔区 Fengsiang
- District
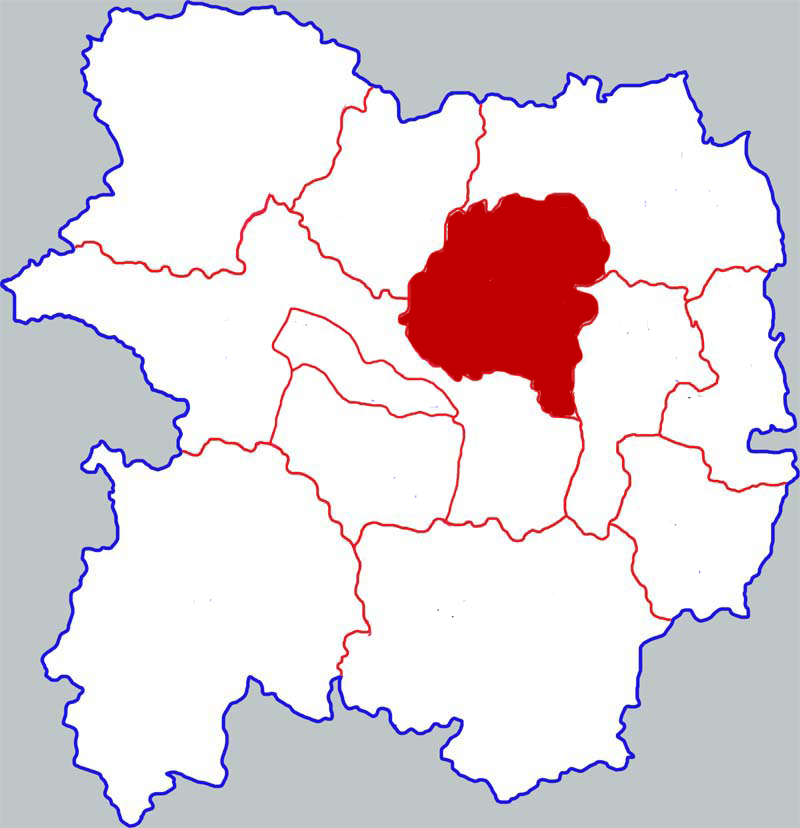
- Fengxiang in Baoji

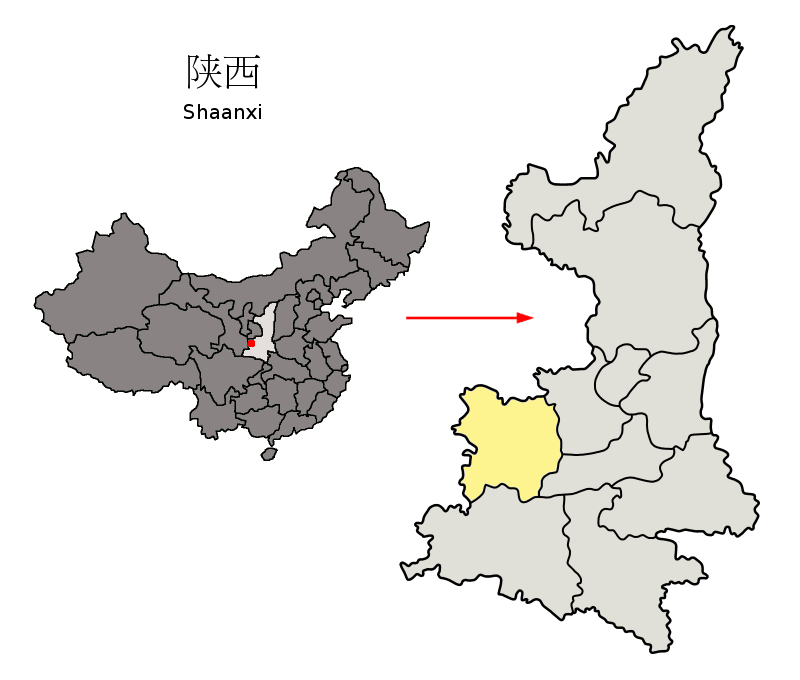
- Baoji in Shaanxi
- Country: China
- Province: Shaanxi
- Prefecture-level City: Baoji

Area
  - Total: 1,179 km^{2} (455 sq mi)

Population (2019)
  - Total: 518,174
  - Density: 439.5/km^{2} (1,138/sq mi)
- Time zone: UTC+8 (China Standard)
- Postal code: 721400
- Area code: 0917

Fengxiang District (simplified Chinese: 凤翔区; traditional Chinese: 鳳翔区; pinyin: Fèngxiáng Qū), formerly, Fengxiang County and its ancient name is Yong county (雍县), is a district administered by Baoji City in the west of Shaanxi province, China. The county covers an area of 1,179 km^{2} (455 sq mi) and as of 2004 had a population of 510,000. The Fengxiang's government's seat is in Chengguan Town (城关镇).

== History ==
The city of Yōng (雍) located in Fengxiang District, was once the capital of the ancient State of Qin during the Zhou dynasty (1046–256 BCE). As Yong's population expanded over time, the surrounding area became Yong County (雍县). During the Tang dynasty (618–907 CE), the area was known variously as Fufeng Commandery (扶風郡) and Qizhou (歧州), and it also served as the Western Capital (西都 or 西京) of the empire.

Fengxiang was the capital of the Qi Kingdom (907–924).

== Geography and Climate ==
The district is between 1,000 and 1,600 metres (3,300 and 5,200 ft) above sea level. It is located in a sub-humid climate to temperate zones. The annual average temperature is 11.8 °C (53.2 °F), with a low of −1.5 °C (29.3 °F) in January, and a high in July of 24.4 °C (75.9 °F), with 608 mm (23.9 in) in precipitation. Sunlight remains until 21:00 hours, and it has a frost-free period of 209 days. Its soil is small oil-based, and in the vast region of the south, there is deep soil, with good cultivation for major grain and cotton production. The hilly area north of the mountains to the river contains more than 1,000 river valleys with silt soil.

Climate data for Fengxiang, elevation 781 m (2,562 ft), (1991–2020 normals, extremes 1981–present)
Month	Jan	Feb	Mar	Apr	May	Jun	Jul	Aug	Sep	Oct	Nov	Dec	Year
Record high °C (°F)	20.2 (68.4)	24.0 (75.2)	28.3 (82.9)	33.7 (92.7)	35.4 (95.7)	40.1 (104.2)	40.5 (104.9)	37.3 (99.1)	38.2 (100.8)	31.3 (88.3)	24.8 (76.6)	21.1 (70.0)	40.5 (104.9)
Mean daily maximum °C (°F)	4.3 (39.7)	8.0 (46.4)	13.6 (56.5)	19.9 (67.8)	24.5 (76.1)	29.4 (84.9)	30.5 (86.9)	28.0 (82.4)	23.0 (73.4)	17.6 (63.7)	11.5 (52.7)	5.8 (42.4)	18.0 (64.4)
Daily mean °C (°F)	−1.3 (29.7)	2.2 (36.0)	7.6 (45.7)	13.4 (56.1)	18.0 (64.4)	22.9 (73.2)	24.9 (76.8)	23.0 (73.4)	18.1 (64.6)	12.3 (54.1)	5.8 (42.4)	0.1 (32.2)	12.3 (54.1)
Mean daily minimum °C (°F)	−5.4 (22.3)	−2.1 (28.2)	2.5 (36.5)	7.6 (45.7)	12.0 (53.6)	16.9 (62.4)	20.0 (68.0)	18.9 (66.0)	14.3 (57.7)	8.4 (47.1)	1.8 (35.2)	−3.9 (25.0)	7.6 (45.6)
Record low °C (°F)	−16.0 (3.2)	−13.4 (7.9)	−8.1 (17.4)	−3.0 (26.6)	1.4 (34.5)	7.3 (45.1)	13.2 (55.8)	10.3 (50.5)	5.0 (41.0)	−4.1 (24.6)	−11.5 (11.3)	−19.2 (−2.6)	−19.2 (−2.6)
Average precipitation mm (inches)	6.9 (0.27)	9.0 (0.35)	22.0 (0.87)	37.2 (1.46)	57.2 (2.25)	69.9 (2.75)	100.2 (3.94)	119.8 (4.72)	102.5 (4.04)	51.5 (2.03)	16.7 (0.66)	4.2 (0.17)	597.1 (23.51)
Average precipitation days (≥ 0.1 mm)	4.5	4.8	6.9	7.4	10.4	10.2	10.4	11.7	12.7	11.0	5.9	3.1	99
Average snowy days	5.7	5.0	2.4	0.2	0	0	0	0	0	0.1	1.9	4.1	19.4
Average relative humidity (%)	59	61	62	65	66	64	70	78	81	77	70	62	68
Mean monthly sunshine hours	143.7	136.1	166.3	192.4	208.1	204.3	202.0	166.2	126.2	130.0	142.2	150.7	1,968.2
Percentage possible sunshine	46	44	45	49	48	47	46	40	34	38	46	50	44
Source: China Meteorological Administration all-time extreme temperature

== Administrative divisions ==
As of 2020, Fengxiang District is divided to 12 towns.

Towns

- Chengguan (城关镇)
- Guowang (虢王镇)
- Biaojiao (彪角镇)
- Hengshui (横水镇)
- Tianjiazhuang (田家庄镇)
- Miganqiao (糜杆桥镇)
- Nanzhihui (南指挥镇)
- Chencun (陈村镇)
- Changqing (长青镇)
- Liulin (柳林镇)
- Yaojiagou (姚家沟镇)
- Fanjiazhai (范家寨镇)

== Economy ==
The district produces a GDP 1.48251 billion yuan, with total retail sales of 385.41 million yuan, the balance of savings deposits of urban and rural residents of 1.04604 billion yuan. It has a financial income of 43.43 million yuan, with 72.85 million yuan in financial expenditure. Industries include farming machinery manufacturing, breweries, cement, ceramics, chemicals, machine brick, sugar, flour, and food processing. Natural resources include mines, and mineral resources are limestone, fire-resistant stone, calcite, iron, lignite, and so on. The highway network includes 863 km (536 mi) of roads.

== Agriculture ==
The district has an agricultural land area of 50,374 ha (124,480 acres), with a forest area of 5.5 ha (14 acres), producing 195,361 tons of food, agriculture, forestry, animal husbandry and fishery output valued at 738.64 million yuan. Main food crops include wheat, with Shaanxi Province is one of the main producing areas; sorghum, corn and beans are followed by other economic crops such as cotton, pepper and tobacco. Farmers in the district has an output of 1,301 yuan per capita net.

== Culture and tourism ==
The district's specialty, Xifeng Jiu baijiu, is well known at home and abroad. Other handicraft include woodcut New Year pictures, clay sculptures, paper cuttings, fireworks paper guns, lacquer, Fung grass, straw hats, and others. Main tourist attractions include East Lake Park, Gu Cheng, Yin Fung Chi which was built in the Song dynasty, Weeping Willow Lake in Xiangying, beautiful, the tomb of Qin Mugong south of the mound, and three Yong City Qindou sites, all provincial-level key heritage conservation units.

The East Lake Park (Donghu Gongyuan) can be dated back to 1062, when Su Shi, who was a judge in Fengxiang at the time, had a drinking water pond dredged out, creating the East Lake Park. The park has a similar pedestrian causeway as the famous Hangzhou West Lake, which was also created by him. The park has an area of 200,000 m^{2} (49 acres) and is home to several historic buildings and sculptures.

== See also ==
- Fengxiang clay sculpture
