= Catholic Church in Shaanxi =

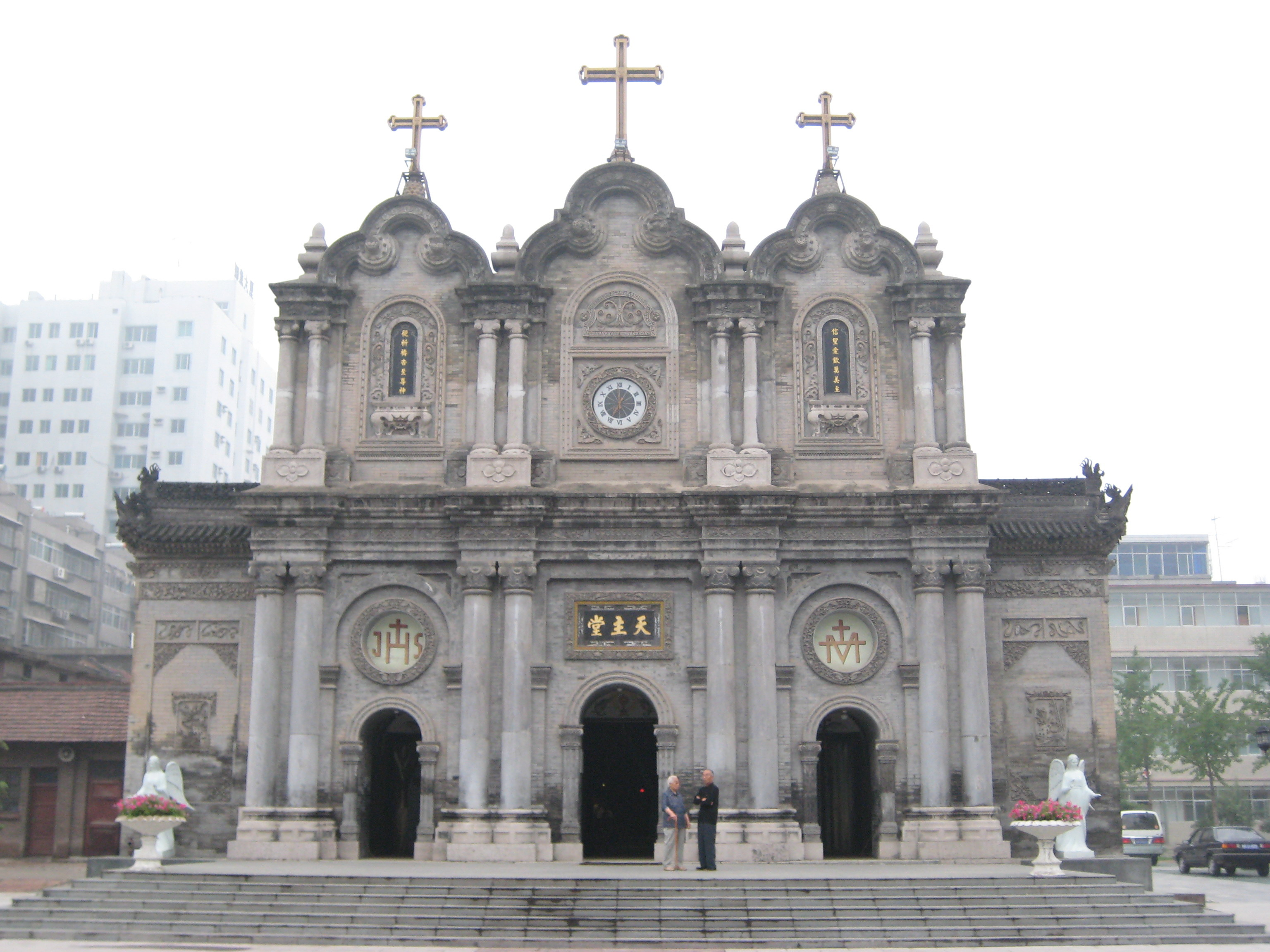
St Francis's Cathedral, Xi'an

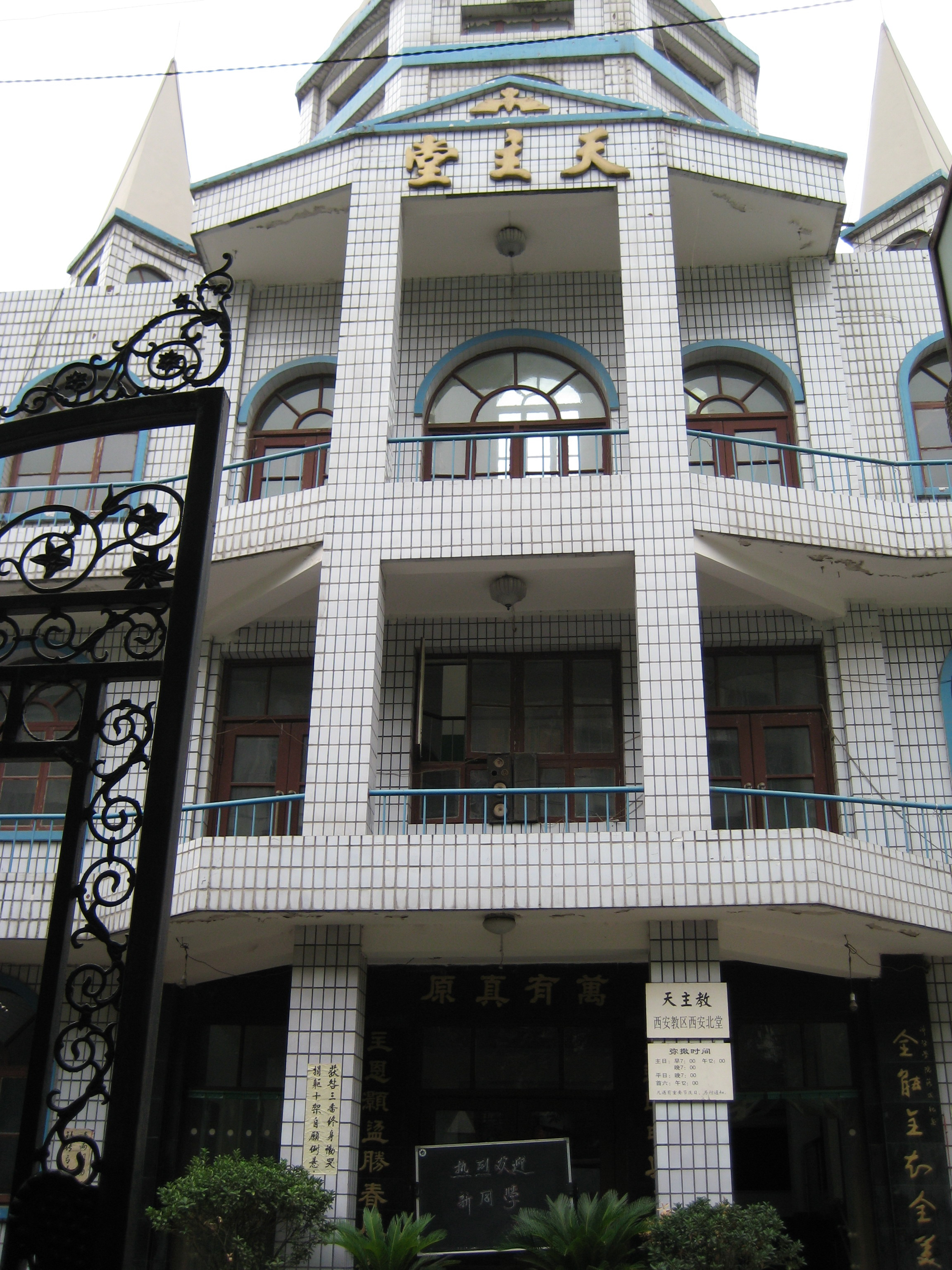
A church in Xi'an

Roman Catholicism is a minority religious denomination in Shaanxi, a province of China. In Xi'an, there is the cathedral of St Francis. Shaanxi has experienced Christian persecution.

== History ==
Catholicism entered Shaanxi before 1700. Zan Jia Cun is a village with a Catholic majority and which is the origin of priests. Xiaoqiaopan is another village with a Catholic majority.

== List of Roman Catholic dioceses with seat in Shaanxi ==
- Roman Catholic Archdiocese of Xi’an
- Roman Catholic Diocese of Fengxiang
- Roman Catholic Diocese of Hanzhong
- Roman Catholic Diocese of Sanyuan
- Roman Catholic Diocese of Yan’an
- Roman Catholic Diocese of Zhouzhi

== See also ==
- Mentuhui
- Catholic Church in Zhifang
- Catholic Church in Sichuan – neighbouring province
