= Sanyuan County =

Coordinates: 34°41′05″N 108°56′15″E

Sanyuan County 三原县
- County
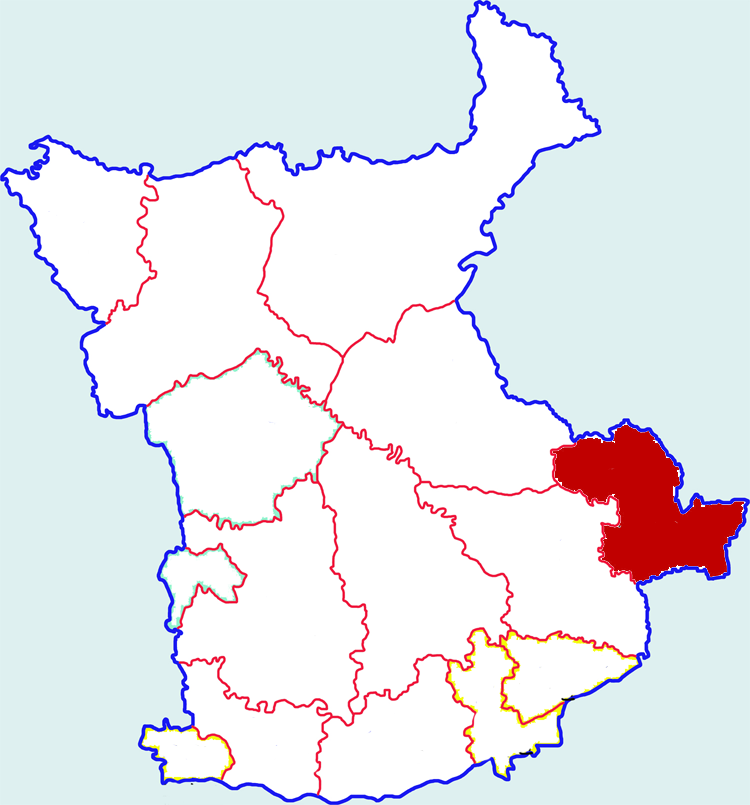
- Sanyuan in Xianyang

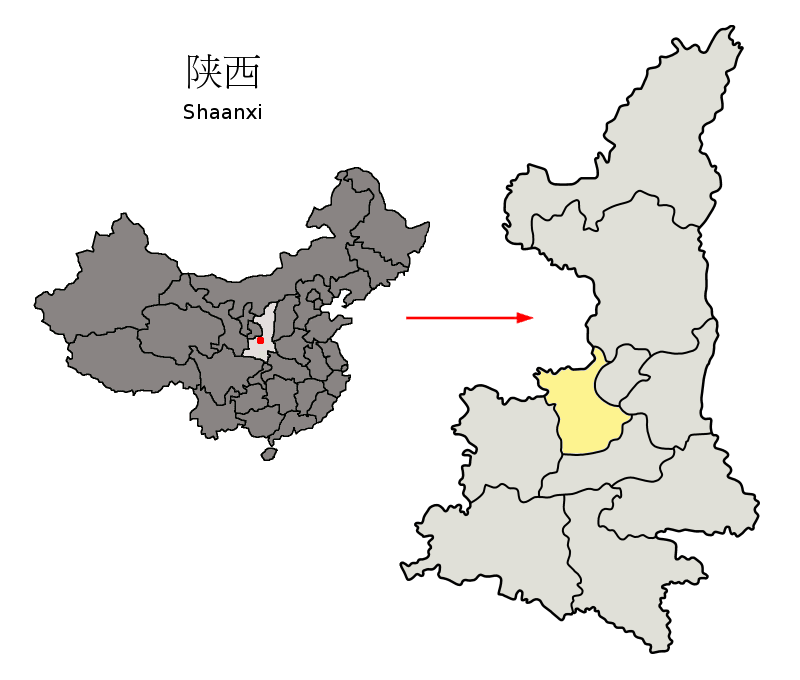
- Xianyang in Shaanxi
- Country: People's Republic of China
- Province: Shaanxi
- Prefecture-level city: Xianyang

Area
  - Total: 576.9 km^{2} (222.7 sq mi)

Population (2018)
  - Total: 408,165
  - Density: 707.5/km^{2} (1,832/sq mi)
- Time zone: UTC+8 (China standard time)
- Postal code: 713800
- Licence plates: 陕D
- Website: www.snsanyuan.gov.cn

Sanyuan (Chinese: 三原; pinyin: Sānyuán) is a county in the central part of Shaanxi province, China. It is the easternmost county-level division of Xianyang City.

== Administrative divisions ==
As of 2016, this County is divided to 11 towns.

Towns

- Chengguan (城关镇)
- Anyue (安乐镇)
- Beixi (陂西镇)
- Duli (独李镇)
- Dacheng (大程镇)
- Xiyang (西阳镇)
- Luqiao (鲁桥镇)
- Lingqian (陵前镇)
- Xinxing (新兴镇)
- Cuo'e (嵯峨镇)
- Qu'an (渠岸镇)

== Climate ==
Climate data for Sanyuan, elevation 424 m (1,391 ft), (1991−2020 normals, extremes 1981−2010)
| Month | Jan | Feb | Mar | Apr | May | Jun | Jul | Aug | Sep | Oct | Nov | Dec | Year |
|---|---|---|---|---|---|---|---|---|---|---|---|---|---|
| Record high °C (°F) | 17.4 (63.3) | 20.2 (68.4) | 32.3 (90.1) | 34.6 (94.3) | 36.9 (98.4) | 42.2 (108.0) | 38.7 (101.7) | 38.5 (101.3) | 34.7 (94.5) | 30.6 (87.1) | 25.1 (77.2) | 18.1 (64.6) | 42.2 (108.0) |
| Mean daily maximum °C (°F) | 5.3 (41.5) | 9.7 (49.5) | 16.9 (62.4) | 22.9 (73.2) | 27.6 (81.7) | 32.3 (90.1) | 33.1 (91.6) | 31.3 (88.3) | 25.7 (78.3) | 20.3 (68.5) | 13.3 (55.9) | 7.2 (45.0) | 20.5 (68.8) |
| Daily mean °C (°F) | −0.2 (31.6) | 3.9 (39.0) | 10.6 (51.1) | 16.4 (61.5) | 21.2 (70.2) | 25.9 (78.6) | 27.6 (81.7) | 26.1 (79.0) | 20.7 (69.3) | 14.8 (58.6) | 7.7 (45.9) | 1.2 (34.2) | 14.7 (58.4) |
| Mean daily minimum °C (°F) | −4.0 (24.8) | −0.3 (31.5) | 5.6 (42.1) | 10.8 (51.4) | 15.5 (59.9) | 20.3 (68.5) | 23.0 (73.4) | 22.0 (71.6) | 16.9 (62.4) | 11.0 (51.8) | 3.9 (39.0) | −2.4 (27.7) | 10.2 (50.3) |
| Record low °C (°F) | −12.1 (10.2) | −9.9 (14.2) | −7.2 (19.0) | 0.1 (32.2) | 3.2 (37.8) | 11.5 (52.7) | 14.8 (58.6) | 13.9 (57.0) | 7.8 (46.0) | −3.3 (26.1) | −7.2 (19.0) | −11.7 (10.9) | −12.1 (10.2) |
| Average precipitation mm (inches) | 7.1 (0.28) | 9.0 (0.35) | 19.4 (0.76) | 30.0 (1.18) | 54.4 (2.14) | 56.7 (2.23) | 33.9 (1.33) | 78.2 (3.08) | 98.6 (3.88) | 45.1 (1.78) | 20.5 (0.81) | 3.3 (0.13) | 456.2 (17.95) |
| Average precipitation days (≥ 0.1 mm) | 3.6 | 4.3 | 4.9 | 6.6 | 9.1 | 8.0 | 9.8 | 9.0 | 11.1 | 9.0 | 5.8 | 2.1 | 83.3 |
| Average snowy days | 3.4 | 2.7 | 0.3 | 0.1 | 0 | 0 | 0 | 0 | 0 | 0 | 0.9 | 1.4 | 8.8 |
| Average relative humidity (%) | 59 | 60 | 54 | 58 | 59 | 58 | 68 | 72 | 76 | 74 | 71 | 60 | 64 |
| Mean monthly sunshine hours | 139.6 | 136.7 | 192.7 | 215.5 | 214.7 | 205.5 | 225.0 | 207.2 | 138.3 | 137.6 | 140.6 | 157.4 | 2,110.8 |
| Percentage possible sunshine | 44 | 44 | 52 | 55 | 49 | 48 | 51 | 50 | 38 | 40 | 46 | 52 | 47 |
Source: China Meteorological Administration

== Transportation ==
- China National Highway 210
- China National Highway 211
