= Joseph Zong Huaide (Shaanxi) =

Chinese bishop (1920–2021)

- Native name: 宗怀德
- Province: Shaanxi

Orders
- Ordination: 1985

Personal details
- Born: 5 March 1920 Sanyuan County, Shaanxi, China
- Died: 5 January 2021 (aged 100) Sanyuan County, Shaanxi, China
- Denomination: Roman Catholic

Chinese name
- Traditional Chinese: 宗懷德
- Simplified Chinese: 宗怀德
Transcriptions
Standard Mandarin
- Hanyu Pinyin: Zōng Huáidé

Joseph Zong Huaide (Chinese: 宗怀德; 5 March 1920 – 5 January 2021) was a Chinese Roman Catholic Bishop of Roman Catholic Diocese of Shaanxi, China.

== Biography ==
Zong was born in Sanyuan County, Shaanxi in March 1920. From 1935 to 1948 he studied at a Catholic church which is named "Jintongfang Little Catholic Church" (Chinese: 进通远坊小修院). He was ordained as priest on 5 June 1949. After the founding of the Communist State, the Roman Catholic was persecuted by the Communist government. He worked at home between 1961 and 1965. On 23 October 1985, he was approved by Pope John Paul II to be the Bishop of Sanyuan Diocese. On 9 August 1987, he was secretly consecrated bishop by Bishop of Tongyuan Roman Catholic Church Li Jingfeng (Chinese: 李镜峰). Some years later, he was recognized as bishop by the Chinese civil authorities. On 23 December 1997, he went to Rome and was received by Pope John Paul II. He died in Sanyuan in January 2021 at the age of 100.
