= Anthony Dang Mingyan =

Chinese Catholic priest (born 1967)

- Archbishop of the Roman Catholic Archdiocese of Xi'an
- Church: St. Francis Cathedral of Xi'an
- Archdiocese: Roman Catholic Archdiocese of Xi'an
- Province: Shaanxi
- Installed: July 5, 2006
- Predecessor: Anthony Li Du'an

Orders
- Ordination: September 1991
- Consecration: July 2005

Personal details
- Born: July 12, 1967 (age 59) Shanyang County, Shaanxi, China
- Denomination: Roman Catholic
- Education: Sheshan Seminary; Shaanxi Normal University

Anthony Dang Mingyan (simplified Chinese: 党明彦; traditional Chinese: 黨明彥; pinyin: Dǎng Míngyàn; born 12 July 1967) is a Chinese Catholic priest and the archbishop of the Roman Catholic Archdiocese of Xi'an since 2006.

== Biography ==
Dang was born as the eighth of nine children in a Catholic family in Getiao Township of Shanyang County, Shaanxi, China, on 12 July 1967. He began a priesthood seminar in Xi'an, Shaanxi in 1985 but continued his theological education at the Sheshan Seminary in Shanghai. He was ordained a priest in 1991. From 1991 to 1996 he taught at Shaanxi Provincial Seminary. In 2002 he was accepted to Shaanxi Normal University, majoring in psychology, where he graduated in 2004. Prior to his diocese, he was the parish priest of St. Antony's Church, four kilometers west of the St. Francis Cathedral of Xi'an, since it opened in 2003. He was consecrated as auxiliary bishop of Xi'an at St. Francis Cathedral on 26 July 2005. His consecration was recognized by Benedict XVI, the Pope at the time. On 5 July 2006, he succeeded Li Du'an as the archbishop of the Roman Catholic Archdiocese of Xi'an.

Catholic Church titles
Previous: Anthony Li Du'an	Archbishop of the Roman Catholic Archdiocese of Xi'an; 2006	Incumbent
