= Archdiocese of Xi'an =

Latin Catholic archdiocese in China

Coordinates: 34.2579°N 108.9290°E

Archdiocese of Xi'an Archidioecesis Singanensis 天主教西安总教区
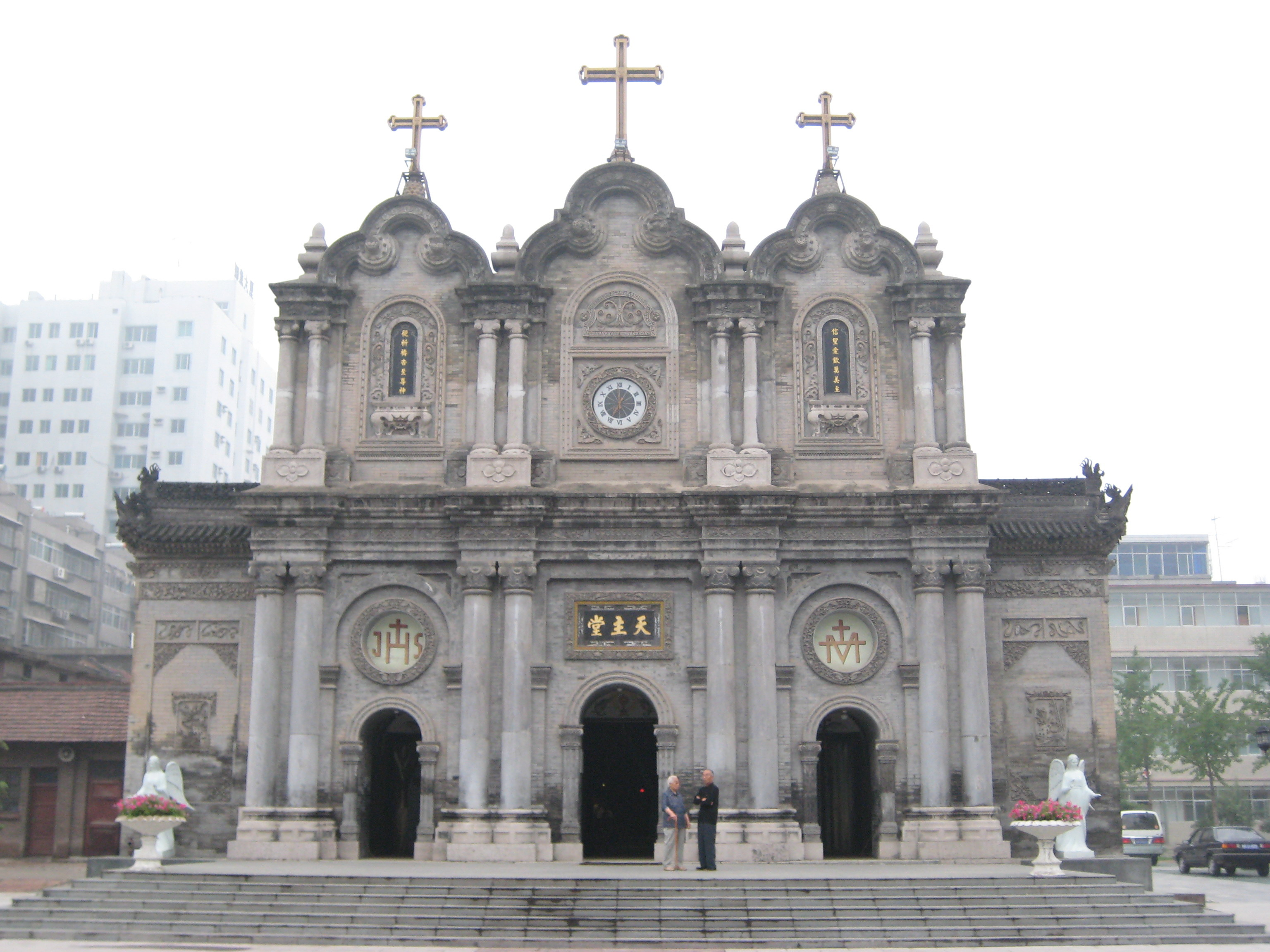
- St. Francis Cathedral of Xi'an

Location
- Country: China
- Ecclesiastical province: Xi'an

Statistics
- Area: 12,000 km^{2} (4,600 sq mi)
- Population: Total; Catholics: (as of 1950); 1,500,000; 13,394 (0.9%)

Information
- Denomination: Catholic Church
- Sui iuris church: Latin Church
- Rite: Roman Rite
- Cathedral: St. Francis Cathedral of Xi'an

Current leadership
- Pope: Leo XIV
- Metropolitan Archbishop: Anthony Dang Mingyan

Website
- http://www.sxtzj.org

The Archdiocese of Xi'an (Latin: Singanen(sis), Chinese: 西安, 長安) is a Latin Church archdiocese of the Catholic Church located in the city of Xi'an (Shaanxi) in China.

== History ==
- April 12, 1911: Established as Apostolic Vicariate of Central Shensi 陝西中境 from the Apostolic Vicariate of Northern Shensi 陝西北境
- December 3, 1924: Renamed as Apostolic Vicariate of Xi'anfu 西安府
- April 11, 1946: Promoted as Metropolitan Archdiocese of Xi'an 西安

== Leadership ==
- Archbishops of Xi'an 西安 (Roman rite)
  - Archbishop Anthony Dang Mingyan (黨明彥), (2006–present)
  - Archbishop Anthony Li Du-an (李笃安), (5 April 1987 - 25 May 2006)
  - Bishop Pacific Li Huan-de, O.F.M. (李宣德) (Apostolic Administrator January 25, 1952–1972)
  - Archbishop Pacifico Giulio Vanni, O.F.M. (萬九樓) (April 11, 1946 - May 10, 1952)
- Vicars Apostolic of Xi'anfu 西安府 (Roman Rite)
  - Bishop Pacifico Giulio Vanni, O.F.M. (萬九樓) (later Archbishop) (June 14, 1932–April 11, 1946)
  - Bishop Fiorenzo Umberto Tessiatore, O.F.M. (戴夏德) (May 16, 1928–April 10, 1932)
  - Bishop Eugenio Massi, O.F.M. (希賢) (December 3, 1924–January 26, 1927)
- Vicars Apostolic of Central Shensi 陝西中境 (Roman Rite)
  - Bishop Eugenio Massi, O.F.M. (希賢) (July 7, 1916–December 3, 1924)
  - Bishop Auguste-Jean-Gabriel Maurice, O.F.M. (穆理思) (April 12, 1911–January 1916)

== Suffragan dioceses ==
- Fengxiang 鳳翔
- Hanzhong 漢中
- Sanyuan 三原
- Yan’an 延安
- Zhouzhi 盩厔

== See also ==
- St. Francis Cathedral of Xi'an
- Roman Catholicism in Shaanxi

== Sources ==
- GCatholic.org
- Catholic Hierarchy
- Official website
