= Paul Liu =

Paul Liu may refer to:

- Paul Liu Hanzuo (1778–1818), Chinese priest and martyr
- Paul Liu Jinghe (1920–2013), Chinese bishop
- Paul Liu (geologist), Chinese geologist and professor
- Paul Liu (politician), Taiwanese business executive and politician
