= Matthew Zhen Xuebin =

Catholic bishop

The Most Reverend Matthew Zhen Xuebin (甄雪斌)
- Coadjutor Bishop of Beijing
- Church: Catholic Church
- Archdiocese: Beijing
- See: Beijing

Orders
- Ordination: 20 June 1998
- Consecration: 25 October 2024

Personal details
- Born: May 1970 (age 56) Changzhi
- Denomination: Catholic
- Motto: Omnia autem facio propter Evangelium (Chinese: 我所行的一切，都是为了福音 ("All this I do for the sake of the gospel"))

Matthew Zhen Xuebin (Chinese: 甄雪斌; pinyin: Zhēn Xuěbīn; born May 10th 1970 in Changzhi, Shanxi) is a Chinese Catholic prelate who serves as Coadjutor bishop of Beijing. He was consecrated a bishop on 25 October 2024, at a ceremony at the North Cathedral in Beijing. His main consecrator to become bishop was Joseph Li Shan.

== Biography ==
Zhen Xuebin was born on May 10th 1970 in Changzhi, Shanxi. His baptismal name is 'Matthew'.

From 1988-1993, he studied at the Beijing Major Seminary (北京天主教神哲学院). From 1993-1997 he studied at Saint John's University in Minnesota. From March to August 1998, he served as director of studies at the Beijing Major Seminary where he earned degrees in theology and liturgy. He was ordained to the priesthood on June 20th 1998. From 1998 to 2007 he served as vice-rector at the Beijing Major Seminary. In 2007, at the time when Joseph Li Shan became bishop of Beijing, Zhen Xuebin also became the secretary for the diocese; a position he continued to hold up until his ordination as bishop. From 2007 to 2020 he was administrator for the international parish of the Beijing archdiocese. From 2016-2019 he served as rector of the North Church (became North Cathedral in 2018) in Beijing. From 2014-2024, he served as vice-chair of the Catholic patriotic association for Beijing. In 2016, he became vice-secretary for the state-controlled Chinese bishops' conference (中國天主教主教團), a position he continued to hold up until his ordination. In June 2024, he became chairman of the "two associations" （两会） for Beijing.

He is also a long-time marathon runner

Ordination

On October 25th 2024, he was ordained as coadjutor bishop for the Beijing Archdiocese. The mass for his ordination included 140 priests and 500 faithful, including religious sisters and Zhen Xuebin's relatives. The co-consecrators were Bishop Peter Ding Lingbin, Bishop Joseph Guo Jincai, Bishop John Baptist Li Suguang and Bishop Anthony Yao Shun.

At his ordination he spoke at the mass, "I am grateful to the Lord for his grace in choosing me, a humble servant, as Coadjutor Bishop of the Diocese of Beijing,...I am aware that I do not have the qualities required for the task entrusted to me, but I accept it in faith and entrust myself to the intercession of the Blessed Virgin Mary and St. Matthew the Apostle, trusting with all my heart and promising to dedicate myself entirely to the fulfilment of my pastoral duties, because ‘All this I do for the sake of the gospel’.”

His appointment as bishop was the first appointment following the renewal of the Vatican-China agreement on episcopal appointments in 2024 and took place within this agreement. AsiaNews reported that some sources had claimed that Bishop Li Shan requested a coadjutor for both health reasons and because of his many duties outside of Beijing as President of the Chinese Catholic Patriotic Association. The request for a coadjutor was unusual since Li Shan was only 59 years old at the time and bishops usually do not get coadjutors until they are closer to retirement (age 75). No official reason was given for the appointment.

2024

In December 2024, Bishop Li Shan and Bishop Matthew Zhen Xuebin presided over the mass to inaugurate the jubilee year at the North Cathedral in Beijing.

2025

In April 2025, Bishop Matthew Zhen Xuebin went to Saint Vincent College in Latrobe, Pennsylvania, in order to celebrate the 100 year anniversary of the founding of Fu Jen Catholic University, which was originally founded in Beijing by Benedictines, but is now located in Taiwan.

In July 2025, Bishop Matthew Zhen Xuebin presided over the Eucharist during a mass at the Major Seminary on the occasion of the granting of the missionary mandate to seminarians.

In October 2025, Bishop Zhen Xuebin presided over the renewal of marriage vows as part of the 420 year anniversary celebrations of the creation of the Xuanwumen church. On the occasion he said "By prioritizing the spiritual life within the family, the love and truth of the faith are transmitted through words and deeds in everyday life. The family, as a small domestic church that spreads the Gospel, bears witness to the faith to all people"

In October 2025, Bishop Zhen Xuebin organized a 'synodal half-marathon' along the banks of the Wenyu river that was meant to raise awareness among all priests about the importance of maintaining physical and mental health.

For All Souls Day 2025, Bishop Zhen Xuebin led a special mass at a Catholic cemetery in Beijing.

2026

In March 2026, Bishop Zhen Xuebin went to the Beijing seminary and called on seminarians to bear witness to the Word of God.

On July 10th 2026, the "Synodal Half Marathon" was held in Beijing; it was organized by Zhen Xuebin, who is himself a long-distance runner.
