= Peter Allsop (disambiguation) =

Peter Allsop or Peter Alsop may refer to:

- Peter Alsop (born 1946), American musician and children's entertainer
- Peter Allsop (1946–2025), British musicologist
- Peter Allsop (publisher) (1924–2010), British barrister and legal publisher
- Peter F. B. Alsop (1935–2014), Australian engineer and historian
