= St. Joseph's Church, Beijing =

St Joseph's Church, Beijing
- Wangfujing Church (Dongtang)
- 大聖若瑟堂
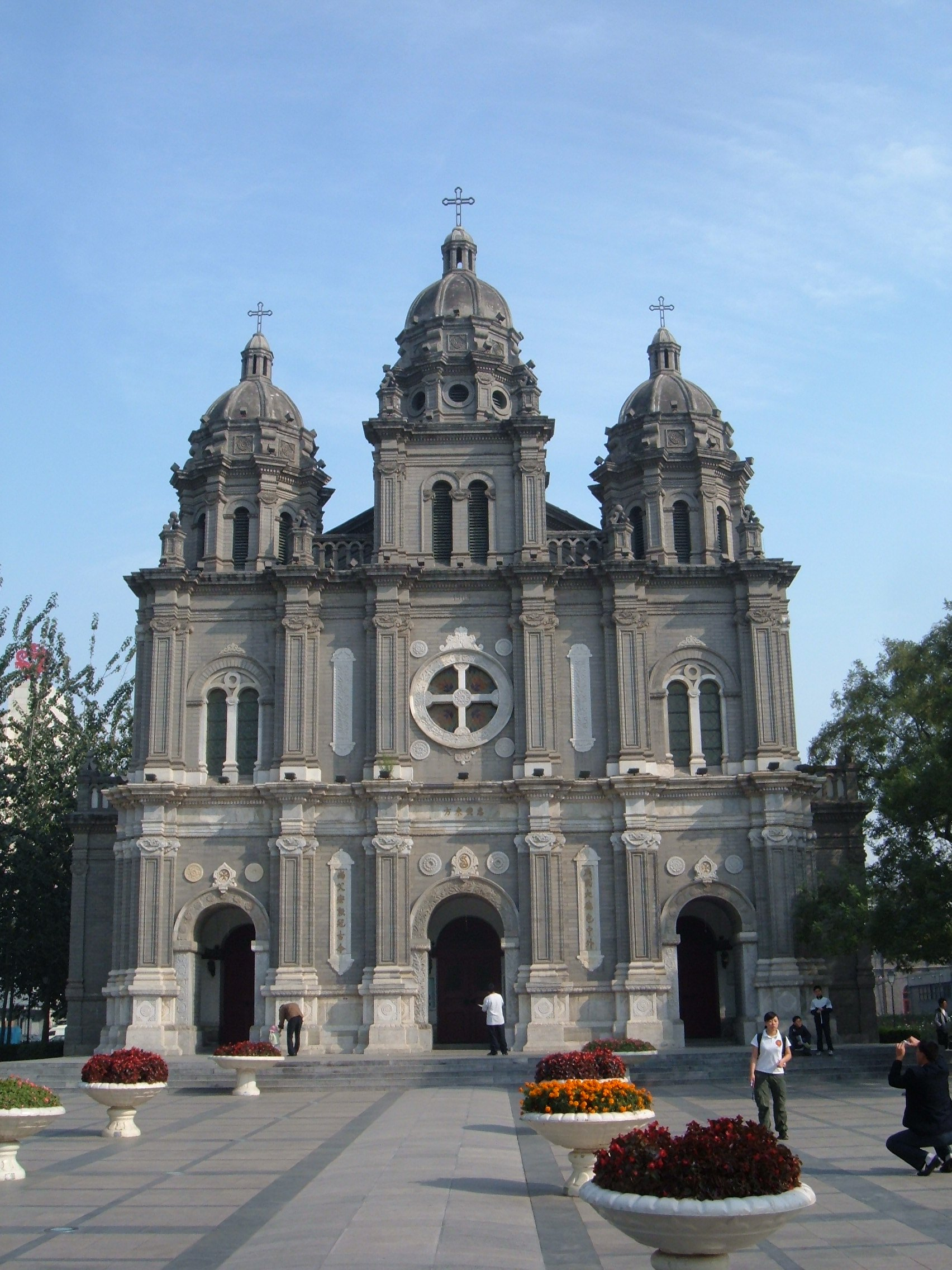

- Location within Beijing Location within China
- 39°54′57″N 116°24′21″E
- Location: Wangfujing, Beijing
- Country: China
- Denomination: Catholic Church

History
- Status: Parish church
- Founded: 1653; 373 years ago
- Founder(s): Lodovico Buglio; Gabriel de Magalhães
- Dedication: Saint Joseph
- Consecrated

Architecture
- Functional status: Active
- Style: Romanesque Revival
- Groundbreaking
- Completed: 1904; 122 years ago

Administration
- Archdiocese: Beijing

Clergy
- Archbishop: Joseph Li Shan

St. Joseph's Church (traditional Chinese: 大聖若瑟堂; simplified Chinese: 大圣若瑟堂), commonly known as Wangfujing Church (王府井天主堂) or Dongtang (東堂, lit. 'East Church'), is an early 20th-century Romanesque Revival church that is one of the four historic Catholic churches in the Archdiocese of Beijing. It is located in the Dongcheng District of the city at 74 Wangfujing Street.

The construction of the church was finished in 1655 by Jesuit missionaries. Due to renovations and reconstruction, the current structure dates back to 1904. The church is the second oldest in Beijing after the Cathedral of the Immaculate Conception.

== History ==
=== Original structures (1653–1900) ===
The congregation was first established in 1653 by Father Lodovico Buglio, an Italian Jesuit astronomer and theologian who worked as a missionary to China; and Father Gabriel de Magalhães, a Portuguese Jesuit. Both worked previously in Sichuan. The land the first church building was constructed on was donated to the religious order by the Shunzhi Emperor. At the time, the Jesuits were the only group of people from Europe given permission to reside in the capital city, on account of their insight into astronomy. As a result, the church also served as the residence of Buglio and another fellow Jesuit priest.

The church underwent an extremely turbulent history. An earthquake which struck Beijing in 1720 damaged the building. Approximately ninety years later, the church building was obliterated by fire and the remnants that survived were destroyed as a result of the government's anti-Western sentiments and policies. The site remained barren until 1860, when British and French forces invaded Beijing as part of the Second Opium War. Thereafter, foreign missionaries, who were once again allowed into the capital, rebuilt St. Joseph's. However, anti-foreign sentiment never faded away and arose once again at the turn of the century, culminating in the Boxer Rebellion. At the height of the uprising in 1900, the church building was "burned to the ground".

=== Present-day church ===
St. Joseph's was rebuilt in 1904 utilizing Romanesque Revival architecture, featuring pilasters and three bell towers.

In 1949, Communist forces under Mao Zedong emerged victorious in the Chinese Civil War. The new atheistic regime broke off all diplomatic relations with the Holy See two years later, and attempted to eliminate all forms of religion by either seizing or destroying churches and other places of worship. St. Joseph's suffered the same fate and, in the 1950s, it was expropriated to the government, who then turned it into an elementary school. The communist government further tightened their control on the Catholic Church in China by establishing the Chinese Patriotic Catholic Association (CPCA) in 1957. As a result, the church of St. Joseph's has been under the administration of the CPCA since that year and its parish priests are not recognized by the Vatican.

The church was closed down altogether in 1966—the first year of the Cultural Revolution—and suffered further damage during this period of time until the end of the revolution in 1976.

=== Restoration ===
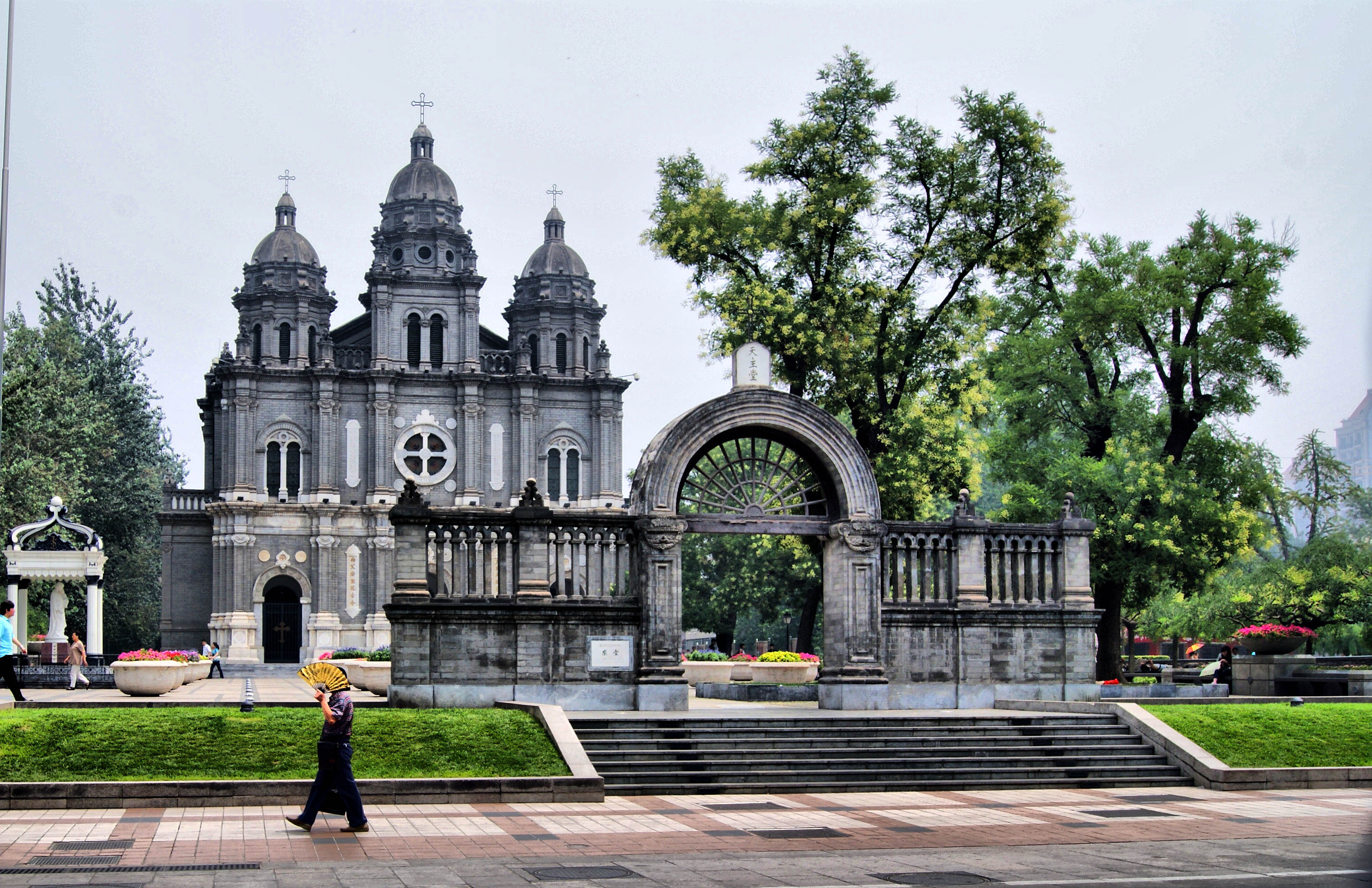
The church and its small square

The Chinese government under Deng Xiaoping subsequently repudiated the Cultural Revolution. The change in prevailing political views was favorable to St. Joseph's Church; the Beijing municipal government funded the church's restoration efforts. The refurbished building reopened in 1980 for Catholic services. Another significant renovation on the church was completed in September 2000. On July 16, 2007, Fr. Joseph Li Shan—the then-parish priest of St. Joseph's—was elected as the new Archbishop of Beijing by the CPCA. Although no official Vatican statement was issued, Pope Benedict XVI expressed his approval of the appointment, making Li one of the few bishops in China to have the support of both the government and the Holy See.

== Architecture ==
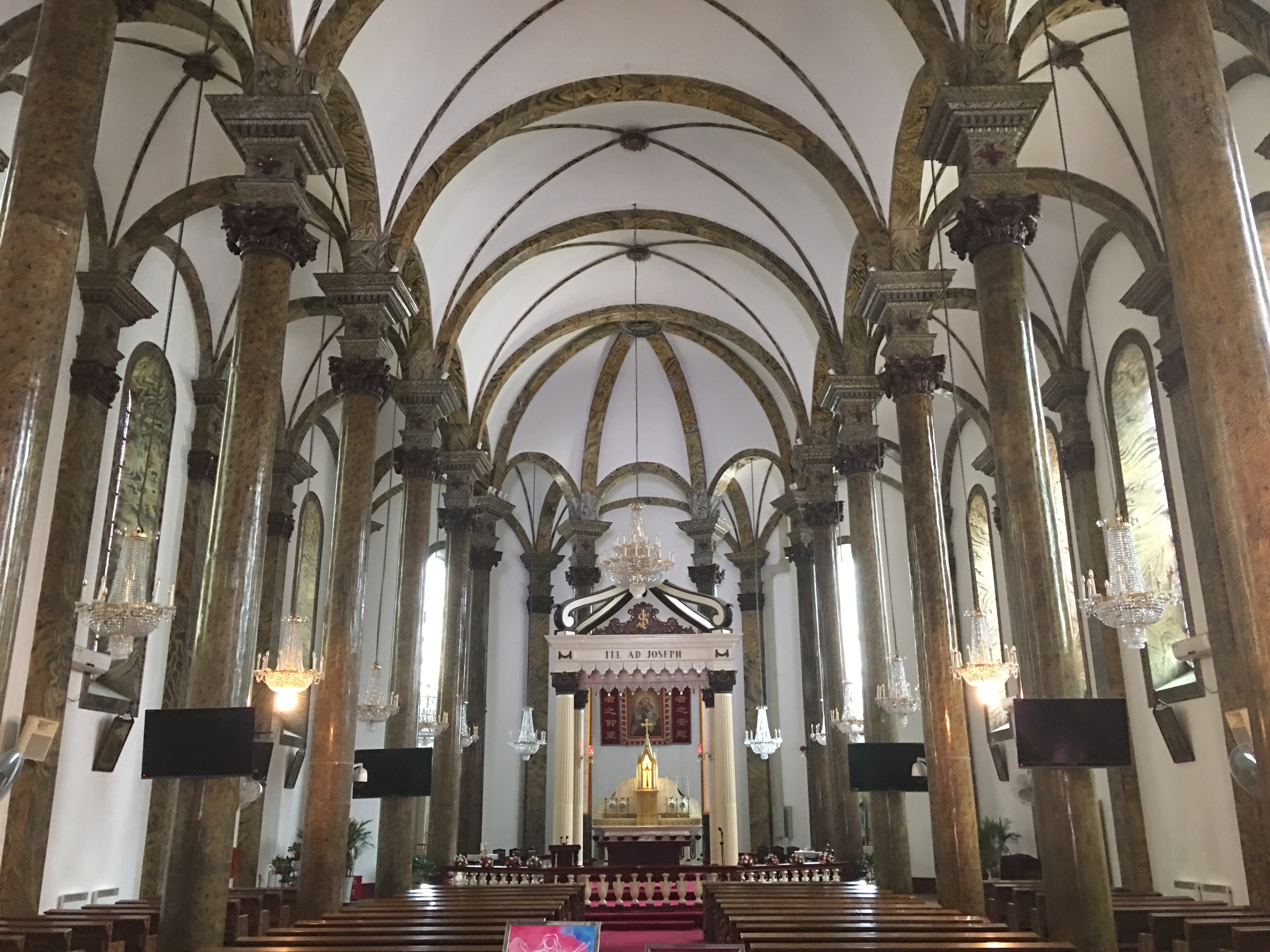
Interior view of St. Joseph's

The church of St. Joseph was built in a Romanesque Revival style and is noted for its mixture of European and local Chinese features in its design. A plaque attached to the outside wall details the history of the church. Surrounding outside the church is a large square and park that is 1.2 hectares. It contains a statue of the Madonna and Child.

== In popular culture ==
The Church of St. Joseph's appears in Cixin Liu's novel The Three Body Problem, where the three Romanesque vaults mirror the nature of the physics conundrum.

== See also ==
- Cathedral of the Immaculate Conception, Beijing
- Jesuit China missions
- Wangfujing
- Xishiku Cathedral (Beitang)
- Xizhimen Church (Xitang)
- List of Jesuit sites
