= Peter Allsop =

British musicologist (1946–2025)

Peter Charles Allsop
- Born: 1946
- Died: 28 March 2025 (aged 79); Devon, England
- Occupations: Musicologist; academic editor
- Employer: University of Exeter
- Known for: Scholarship on seventeenth-century Italian instrumental music; studies of Arcangelo Corelli, Giovanni Battista Buonamente, and Teodorico Pedrini
- Spouse: Rosemary Allsop (d. 2018)

Academic background
- Education: University of Oxford (DPhil)

Peter Charles Allsop (1946 – 28 March 2025) was a British musicologist and Reader in Musicology at the University of Exeter, who specialised in seventeenth-century Italian instrumental music and, later in his career, the transmission of European Baroque music to China. He wrote four books, published by Oxford University Press, Ashgate Publishing, and Cambridge Scholars Publishing, and founded New Orpheus Editions, a Crediton-based press producing critical editions of early Italian instrumental music. His work concentrated on the trio sonata, Arcangelo Corelli, Giovanni Battista Buonamente, and the Italian missionary Teodorico Pedrini, and questioned established historiographical assumptions about the development of the Baroque sonata.

== Life ==
Originally trained as a violinist, Allsop studied music in London and Bologna before reading for his doctorate at the University of Oxford, where his thesis addressed seventeenth-century Italian instrumental music. He subsequently joined the University of Exeter as a tutor in its Department of Music, later becoming Reader in Musicology, a position he held for many years. He chaired a session at the Royal Musical Association's 34th Research Students' Conference, hosted by the University of Exeter in December 2000.

He contributed to the Oxford Companion to Music, where he is described as Reader in Musicology at the University of Exeter and credited as the author of The Italian 'Trio' Sonata (1992) and Arcangelo Corelli: New Orpheus of Our Times (1999).

While researching his biography of Arcangelo Corelli, Allsop found that Corelli's music had been introduced to the Chinese imperial court by the Italian Vincentian missionary and composer Teodorico Pedrini (1671–1746). This finding redirected the later part of his career toward the intersection of European Baroque music and the history of Catholic missions to China. From 2007, supported by two Leverhulme Research Fellowships, he taught historical musicology and performance practice at the Central Conservatory of Music in Beijing and subsequently at the China Conservatory of Music. He was identified as Visiting Professor at the Central Conservatory of Music in connection with a public lecture co-delivered with Joyce Lindorff at the University of Southern California.

Outside his academic career, Allsop was choirmaster for many years at St Swithun's Church in Sandford, Devon, where he lived from 1978.

Allsop died suddenly on 28 March 2025, aged 78.

== Scholarship ==
=== Intellectual focus ===
Allsop's scholarship had two related major aims: to give a source-based account of Italian instrumental ensemble music before Corelli, and to challenge what he regarded as a distorted picture of how the Baroque sonata developed. He argued against the view of Corelli as the culmination of earlier seventeenth-century practice, contending instead that Corelli's works resulted from specific regional interactions rather than a single evolutionary process.

A related concern was the genre classification sonata da chiesa. Allsop argued that the term was rarely used by Italian composers of the period, including Corelli, who never applied it to his own works, and that its adoption as a category reflects a northern European Protestant interpretive framework imposed on Italian practice. He set out this argument in a 1997 article and expanded on it in his Corelli monograph, proposing the designation "free sonata" in place of sonata da chiesa. The argument was disputed by at least one reviewer, Gregory Barnett, prompting a published exchange between the two in the Journal of Seventeenth-Century Music.

His later work moved beyond Italian Baroque repertory. While preparing his Corelli biography, he found that Teodorico Pedrini, the Italian Vincentian missionary at the Qing imperial court, had introduced Corelli's music to China. This led to a research programme on Pedrini's musical and diplomatic activities in Beijing, resulting in a co-authored journal article, a lecture series with Joyce Lindorff of Temple University, and a book published by Cambridge Scholars Publishing in 2023, funded by two Leverhulme Research Fellowships.

His third book proposed Giovanni Battista Buonamente as a significant figure in the Italian violin tradition, arguing that Buonamente's structural range prefigured aspects of Corelli's work and that his influence on Marco Uccellini and later Modenese composers had been underestimated.

=== New Orpheus Editions ===
Alongside his books, Allsop founded and ran New Orpheus Editions, based in Crediton, Devon, through which he published critical editions of seventeenth-century Italian instrumental music, including works by Bartolomeo Laurenti, Tomaso Antonio Vitali, and Carlo Ambrogio Lonati (see Editions, below).

== Publications ==
=== Books ===
- Allsop, Peter (1992). The Italian 'Trio' Sonata: From Its Origins Until Corelli. Oxford Monographs on Music. Oxford University Press. ISBN 978-0-19-816229-2.

A study of Italian instrumental ensemble music of the seventeenth century, based on surviving primary sources. It covers the major composers of Italian trio sonatas before Corelli, and presents Corelli's works as the outcome of an interaction between two regional traditions rather than as an inevitable culmination of prior history.

- Allsop, Peter (1999). Arcangelo Corelli: 'New Orpheus of Our Times'. Oxford Monographs on Music. Oxford University Press. ISBN 978-0-19-816562-0.

A study of Corelli, drawing on archival research. Allsop questions the view, associated with Charles Burney and John Hawkins, of Corelli as a consolidator of past trends rather than an originator, and argues that his allegiance to the Roman School is central to understanding his output. Reviewed in the Journal of the American Musicological Society (2002).

- Allsop, Peter (2005). Cavalier Giovanni Battista Buonamente: Franciscan Violinist. Aldershot: Ashgate Publishing. ISBN 978-1-84014-627-1.

About Giovanni Battista Buonamente (c. 1600–1642), arguing for his significance in the Italian violin tradition. Allsop traces a line of stylistic influence from Salamone Rossi through Buonamente to Marco Uccellini, with analyses of Buonamente's sinfonias, free sonatas, variation sets, canzonas, and dances; he argues Buonamente was the first Italian composer to make substantial use of the ensemble suite. Reviewed in Music and Letters (2006) and Early Music (2006).

- Allsop, Peter (2023). Teodorico Pedrini and the Ruin of the Christian Mission to China. Newcastle upon Tyne: Cambridge Scholars Publishing. ISBN 978-1-5275-9136-3.

A study of Teodorico Pedrini (1671–1746), the Italian Vincentian missionary who served at the Qing imperial court in Beijing and introduced Corelli's music to China. Drawing on almost 2,000 pages of Pedrini's correspondence, the book examines his role in the Chinese Rites controversy, arguing that neither the papal decisions of 1704 nor Pedrini's own actions were the decisive factors in the eventual proscription of Christian preaching in China in 1724. The research was funded by two Leverhulme Research Fellowships.

=== Journal articles ===
- Allsop, Peter; Lindorff, Joyce (2008). "Teodorico Pedrini: The Music and Letters of an 18th-century Missionary in China". Vincentian Heritage Journal. 27 (2).
- Allsop, Peter (1997). "Sonata da chiesa: a Case of Mistaken Identity?". The Consort. 53 (1): 4–14.
- Allsop, Peter (2002). "In Defence of Arcangelo Corelli: New Orpheus of Our Times". Journal of Seventeenth-Century Music. 8 (1). [Response to a review by Gregory Barnett, JSCM 6/2 (2000).]

=== Editions (New Orpheus Editions, Crediton) ===
- Carlo Ambrogio Lonati, Simfonie a 3 [in G, G and A], ed. Allsop. Italian Seventeenth-Century Instrumental Music, Series I: Rome, i. Crediton: New Orpheus Editions, 1990.
- Bartolomeo Laurenti, Suonate per camera, nos. 1–6: à violino, e violoncello, Op. 1 (1691). Crediton: New Orpheus Editions, 1993.
- Tomaso Antonio Vitali, Sonate da camera: à tre, Op. III (1695). Crediton: New Orpheus Editions, 1993.

== Reception ==
Allsop's books were reviewed in the principal journals of the field, with generally favourable assessments alongside some points of disagreement. The Journal of the American Musicological Society described the Corelli biography as "a substantial contribution to our knowledge of an important and oddly neglected composer". The Buonamente volume was reviewed by Michael Talbot in Music and Letters, who wrote that Buonamente was "exceptional both for the unusually large dimensions of his compositions and, fortunately, for the skill with which he organises their thematic material", and by Andrew Dell'Antonio in Early Music, who described the book as bringing "much new information to the table".

Allsop's reclassification of the sonata da chiesa as "free sonata" was not universally accepted: Gregory Barnett's review of the Corelli book in the Journal of Seventeenth-Century Music (2000) took issue with the argument, and in response Allsop defended his terminological and historical claims in the same journal in 2002.
