= Diocese of Zhaoxian =

Roman Catholic diocese in China

Coordinates: 37°44′N 114°46′E

Diocese of Zhaoxian Dioecesis Ciaoscienensis 天主教赵县教区

Location
- Country: China
- Ecclesiastical province: Beijing
- Metropolitan: Beijing

Statistics
- Population: Total; Catholics: (as of 1947); 900,000; 45,000 (5.0%)
- Parishes: 18

Information
- Denomination: Catholic Church
- Sui iuris church: Latin Church
- Rite: Roman Rite
- Established: 18 March 1929; 97 years ago

Current leadership
- Pope: Leo XIV
- Bishop: Sede vacante
- Metropolitan Archbishop: Joseph Li Shan

The Roman Catholic Diocese of Zhaoxian (Latin: Ciaoscienen(sis), Chinese: 趙縣) is a diocese located in Zhao County in the ecclesiastical province of Beijing in China.

== History ==
- 18 March 1929: Established as Apostolic Prefecture of Zhaoxian 趙縣 from the Apostolic Vicariate of Zhengdingfu 正定府
- 11 January 1932: Promoted as Apostolic Vicariate of Zhaoxian 趙縣
- 11 April 1946: Promoted as Diocese of Zhaoxian 趙縣

== Leadership ==
Bishops of Zhaoxian 趙縣 (Roman rite)

- Joseph Jiang Mingyuan, C.D.D. (姜明遠) (22 March 2006 – 13 July 2008)
- Raymond Wang Chong Lin (王宠林) (9 March 1983 – 12 March 2006), resigned
- Stanislaus Min Xilian (11 January 1982 – 1983)
- Thomas Min Doumu (see below ~1981 – 1982)
  - Apostolic Administrator Thomas Min Doumu (13 February 1953 – 1982)
- John Zhang Bi-de (張弼德) (see below 11 April 1946 – 13 February 1953), resigned

Vicars Apostolic of Zhaoxian 趙縣 (Roman Rite)

- John Zhang Bi-de (張弼德) (see below 11 January 1932 – 11 April 1946 see above)

Prefects Apostolic of Zhaoxian 趙縣 (Roman Rite)

- John Zhang Bi-de (張弼德) (9 April 1929 – 11 January 1932 see above)

Coadjutor Bishop

- Joseph Jiang Mingyuan, C.D.D. (姜明遠) (2000-2006)
