= Matthias Pei Shangde =

- Archbishop of the Roman Catholic Archdiocese of Beijing
- Church: Cathedral of the Immaculate Conception, Beijing
- Province: Roman Catholic Archdiocese of Beijing
- Installed: June 29, 1989
- Term ended: December 24, 2001
- Predecessor: Thomas Tien Ken-sin
- Successor: Joseph Li Shan

Orders
- Ordination: May 30, 1948

Personal details
- Born: 1918 Zhuolu County, Hebei
- Died: December 24, 2001 (aged 82–83) Zhangjiakou, Hebei
- Denomination: Roman Catholic

Matthias Pei Shangde (Chinese: 裴尚德; pinyin: Péi Shàngdé; 1918 - 24 December 2001) was a Chinese Catholic prelate and Archbishop of the Roman Catholic Archdiocese of Beijing from 1989 to 2001.

== Biography ==
Pei was born into a Catholic family in Zhuolu County, Hebei in 1918. At the age of 13, he entered the Congregatio Discipulorum Domini, which was founded by Archbishop Celso Benigno Luigi Costantini. He was ordained a priest on May 30, 1948. In 1950, he worked at Beijing Pharmaceutical Factory. During the Cultural Revolution, he was sentenced to ten years of labor reform. He was released in 1980. In 1989 he was secretly appointed and ordained Archbishop of the Roman Catholic Archdiocese of Beijing. When he died, he had been under house arrest since April 2001. Police ordered his funeral to be low profile, with participation only from the village where he had lived.

Catholic Church titles
| Previous: Thomas Tien Ken-sin | Archbishop of the Roman Catholic Archdiocese of Beijing; 1989–2001 | Next: Joseph Li Shan |
