= Joseph Jiang Mingyuan =

Chinese Catholic priest and Bishop

- Bishop of the Roman Catholic Diocese of Zhaoxian
- Province: Beijing
- Metropolis: Beijing
- Diocese: Roman Catholic Diocese of Zhaoxian
- Installed: 2006
- Term ended: 2007
- Predecessor: Raymond Wang Chong Lin
- Successor: Raymond Wang Chong Lin

Orders
- Ordination: 1981 by Raymond Wang Chong Lin

Personal details
- Born: February 21, 1931 Ningjin County, Hebei, China
- Died: July 13, 2008 (aged 77) China
- Denomination: Roman Catholic

Chinese name
- Traditional Chinese: 姜明遠
- Simplified Chinese: 姜明远
Transcriptions
Standard Mandarin
- Hanyu Pinyin: Jiāng Míngyuǎn

Joseph Jiang Mingyuan (Chinese: 姜明远; February 21, 1931 – July 13, 2008) was a Chinese Catholic priest and Bishop of the Roman Catholic Diocese of Zhaoxian.

== Biography ==
Jiang was born in Ningjin County, Hebei, to a Catholic family, on February 21, 1931. He was a member of the Congress of the Lord's disciples, founded by the apostolic delegation Archbishop Celso Benigno Luigi Costantini in China in 1927.

He studied at Hengyi School (恒毅中学) and Gengxin School (耕莘中学). And conducted his philosophical and teological studies between 1953 and 1958. The Communist government forced him to become a normal worker late in 1958, but he was still arrested in 1961 and sentenced to reform at work. He wasn't released until 1969, and was kept under surveillance after his release.

He was ordained a priest in 1981. Shortly after Bishop Raymond Wang Chong Lin secretly vigiled him to his Code Corp on January 8, 2000, he was arrested and detained for five months. Later that year, he was affected by brain bleeding. He was admitted as Bishop of the Roman Catholic Diocese of Zhaoxian during an oil sale on March 22, 2006, after Pope Benedict XVI admitted Bishop Wang's departure. But only a year after, he had to override the management responsibility back to Bishop Wang because of the impaired health.

After a heart attack in March 2008, Bishop Jiang was entered hospital twice. He lived in a church driven sanatorium to his death.

Catholic Church titles
Previous: Raymond Wang Chong Lin	Bishop of the Roman Catholic Diocese of Zhaoxian; 2006–2007	Succeeded by Raymond Wang Chong Lin
