= Xitang (disambiguation) =

Xitang is a town in Jiashan County, Zhejiang, China

Xītáng (西塘) may also refer to:

- Xitang, Yueyang, a town in Yueyanglou District, Yueyang, Hunan, China
- Church of Our Lady of Mount Carmel, Beijing, China, commonly called Xitang (西堂)
