= Paul Liu Jinghe =

Chinese bishop

His Excellency, The Most Reverend Paul Liu Jinghe
- Vice-President of Chinese Patriotic Catholic Association
- Archdiocese: Yongping
- Installed: 1981
- Term ended: 2010

Orders
- Ordination: 1945
- Consecration: December 20, 1981

Personal details
- Born: December 26, 1920 Fengrun District, Tangshan, Hebei, China
- Died: December 11, 2013 (aged 92) Tangshan, Hebei, China
- Denomination: Roman Catholic
- Education: Beijing Wensheng College

Chinese name
- Traditional Chinese: 劉景和
- Simplified Chinese: 刘景和
Transcriptions
Standard Mandarin
- Hanyu Pinyin: Liú Jǐnghé

Paul Liu Jinghe (Chinese: 刘景和; 26 December 1920 - 11 December 2013) was a Chinese Catholic prelate who served as Bishop of Yongping from 1981 to 2010. He was also the vice-president of Chinese Patriotic Catholic Association and vice-president of the Bishops Conference of the Catholic Church in China.

He was a member of the 6th, 7th, 8th and 9th National Committee of the Chinese People's Political Consultative Conference.

== Biography ==
Liu was born in Fengrun District, Tangshan, Hebei, on December 26, 1920, to a Catholic family. From 1926 to 1931 He attended the Huanghuagang Missionary School. In 1939 he was accepted to the Beijing Wensheng College, majoring in philosophy, where he graduated in 1945. On May 4, 1945, he was ordained as priest by Bishop of Beijing, Paul Leon Cornelius Montaigne, CM.

Jinghe was sent to jail in 1946 and released in March of the following year. On November 13, 1954, he was imprisoned in the Tangshan No. 1 Detention House. During the Cultural Revolution, the Communist government suppressed freedom of religious belief and Liu was re-imprisoned. In the autumn of 1970 he was sent to textile mill, quarry and coke-oven plant to reform through labour. After the 3rd Plenary Session of the 11th Central Committee of the Chinese Communist Party, a policy of some religious freedom was implemented.

On December 20, 1981, Jinghe was consecrated as a Bishop of Yongping by Bishops Chang Shouyi, John Wang Qiwei and Pan Shaoqing. On December 7, 1984, he founded the Hebei Catholic Seminary. On October 20, 2010, He refused to attend Joseph Guo Jincai's illegal pastoral ceremony in Chengde Diocese.

Jinghe retired on November 17, 2010, and died on December 11, 2013.
