= An Account of the Entry of the Catholic Religion into Sichuan =

1918 book by François-Marie-Joseph Gourdon

- Editor: François-Marie-Joseph Gourdon
- Original title: 聖教入川記
- Language: Traditional Chinese (first ed.); simplified Chinese (reprint)
- Subject: History of the Catholic Church in Sichuan; conquest and massacre of Sichuan by Zhang Xianzhong
- Genre: History
- Publisher: Imprimerie de la Sainte-Famille (first ed.); Sichuan People's Publishing House (reprint)
- Publication date: 1918 (first edition); April 1981 (reprint)
- Publication place: Republican China
- Media type: Print (paperback)
- Pages: 76 (first ed.); 139 (reprint)
- OCLC: 14946442

An Account of the Entry of the Catholic Religion into Sichuan, (Note: In traditional Chinese: 聖教入川記; simplified Chinese: 圣教入川记; pinyin: Shèng Jiào Rù Chuān Jì; Wade–Giles: Shêng Chiao Ju Chuan Chi; Sichuanese romanization: Shen Chiao Ru Chuan Chi; lit. 'An Account of the Entry of the Holy Religion into Sichuan'. Sichuan, formerly romanized as Szechwan in English, and Setchouan in French.) also referred to as Mission to Sichuan, is a 1918 history book edited by Paris Foreign Missions Society missionary François-Marie-Joseph Gourdon in Chinese, and published by the Imprimerie de la Sainte-Famille (Note: traditional Chinese: 聖家書局; simplified Chinese: 圣家书局; pinyin: Shèngjiā Shūjú; Sichuanese romanization: Shen^{4} Chia^{1} Shu^{1} Chü^{5}; lit. 'Holy Family Press') in the city of Chongqing, (Note: Formerly romanized as Chungking in English, and Tchongkin in French.) with the approval of Célestin Chouvellon, Apostolic Vicar of Eastern Szechwan.

== Synopsis ==
Allegedly based on Relação das tyranias obradas por Canghien Chungo famoso ladrão da China em o anno de 1651 ('Account of Tyrannies Wrought by Zhang Xianzhong, China's Famous Looter in the Year 1651') by Gabriel de Magalhães, the book recounts the early history of Roman Catholic mission in Sichuan throughout the 1640s, providing first-hand witness testimony by Lodovico Buglio and Gabriel de Magalhães on Zhang Xianzhong's reign and massacre in Sichuan. As well as the subsequent development of the Church in Sichuan up until the date of its publication.

== Editions ==
The first edition contains 76 pages, published in Chongqing by the Imprimerie de la Sainte-Famille, aimed at Catholics in east Sichuan, hence is limited to only 2000 copies. A Chronicle by Mister Wuma was added to the end of the reprint edition, making a total of 139 pages. This version is limited to 3200 copies, published for historical research only.

== The editor ==
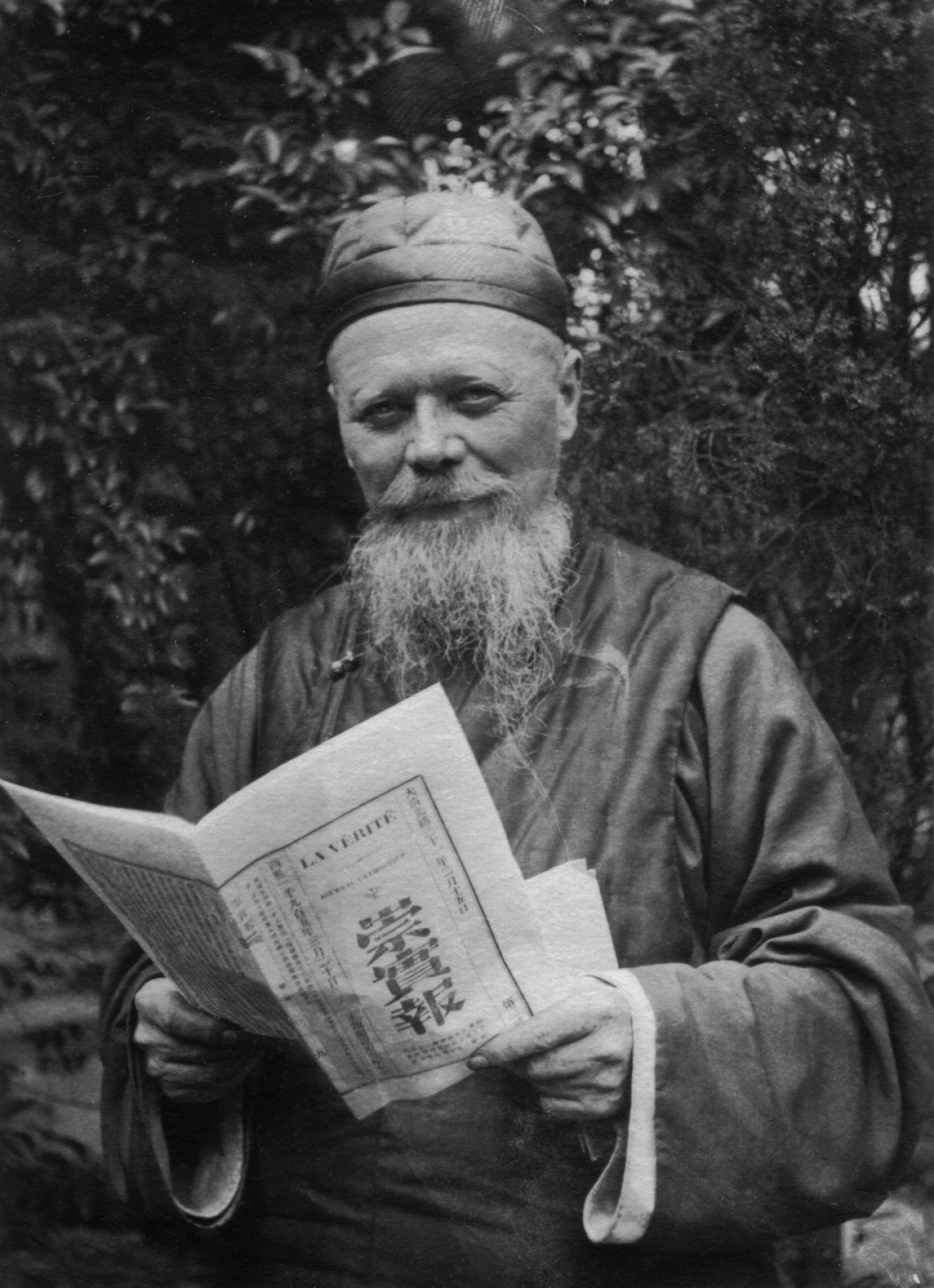
François Gourdon holding La Vérité

François-Marie-Joseph Gourdon was born in 1842. In 1866, he was sent to the Apostolic Vicariate of Eastern Szechwan by Paris Foreign Missions Society, he died in Chongqing in 1927. During his station in Chongqing, Gourdon took charge of several seminaries and temporarily assumed the role of superior of the major seminary. In 1904, he co-founded the bimonthly newspaper La Vérité with a fellow missionary Henri Louis (1870–1950), which became weekly the following year and had two thousand subscribers. An Account was edited and noted by Gourdon based on a hand-copy manuscript that he received from a Jesuit in Shanghai, which contains detailed accounts of the first Catholic mission in Sichuan carried out by Lodovico Buglio and Gabriel de Magalhães, and allegedly being Relação das tyranias obradas por Canghien Chungo famoso ladrão da China em o anno de 1651 authored by the latter. He was also the author of Grammatica latina accomodata ad usum alumnorum missionis Se-tchouan orientalis (1894), Acta RR.DD. V.A. Missionis Se-tchouan Collecta (1901) and Beati Martyres provinciæ Se-tchouan in Sinis 1815–1823 (1901).

== Reception ==
On NetEase, a review says: 'The book provides valuable first-hand historical materials for the study of Zhang Xianzhong's Daxi regime'. Zheng Guanglu, a Sichuanese writer from Chengdu, remarked that the book is one of the hard evidences of the Sichuan massacre carried out by Zhang Xianzhong, in contrast to the false claim made by some historians that the massacre was fabricated by feudal landlord class out of instinctive hatred against peasant class and uprisings led by it.

== See also ==
- Catholic Church in Sichuan
- List of massacres in China
