= Roman Catholic Diocese of Chengde =

Roman Catholic diocese in China

Diocese of Chengde 承德教区

Location
- Country: China
- Territory: Chengde
- Ecclesiastical province: Beijing
- Metropolitan: Beijing

Statistics
- Area: 39,519 km^{2} (15,258 sq mi)
- Population: Total; Catholics: (as of 2018); 3,700,000; 25,000 (0.7%)

Information
- Rite: Latin Rite

Current leadership
- Pope: Francis
- Bishop: Joseph Guo Jincai
- Metropolitan Archbishop: Joseph Li Shan

The Roman Catholic Diocese of Chengde (Chinese: 承德) is a Catholic diocese seated in the city of Chengde in the ecclesiastical province of Beijing in China. It was erected as the Diocese of Chengde on 22 September 2018, taken of parts of the territories of the Diocese of Jehol and of the Diocese of Chifeng. It was the first diocese to be erected after the China-Vatican agreement of 22 September 2018, the first new Catholic diocese in China since 1949 and the first change to the Catholic hierarchy in China since 1951.

The boundaries of the diocese are equal to those of the civil prefecture-level city of Chengde in Hebei province.
