= Roman Catholic Diocese of Citong =

District of Catholicism in 14th-century China

The Roman Catholic Diocese of Citong was a short-lived (1313-1370?) Latin Catholic Diocese in Yuan Dynasty China. It was located in the modern day city of Quanzhou.

== History ==
It was established in 1313 as Diocese of Citong 刺桐 alias Quanzhou 泉州 (中文), Zaitun or Zayton, on territory split off from the then Roman Catholic Archdiocese of Khanbalik (precursor of Peking) within the empire of the Mongol Great Khan.

About 1370 it was suppressed, without formal successor.

== Episcopal ordinaries ==
(all Roman Rite and Italian missionary members of the same Latin mendicant order)

Suffragan Bishops of Citong

- Gerardo Albuini (哲樂篤), Friars Minor (O.F.M. (1313 – death 1318), previously Auxiliary Bishop of Khanbalik 汗八里 (China) (1313 – 1313)
- Andrea da Perugia (安德律), O.F.M. (1318 – 1320? see below), previously Auxiliary Bishop of Khanbalik 汗八里 (China) (1313 – 1318)
- Pellegrino da Castello (柏萊立), O.F.M. (1320? – death 1322.07.06), previously Auxiliary Bishop of Khanbalik 汗八里 (China) (1313 – 1320?)
- Andrea da Perugia (安德律), O.F.M. (again - see above 1323 – death 1327)
- Pietro da Firenze (白道祿), O.F.M. (1332 – death 1362)
- Giacomo da Firenze (雅格柏), O.F.M. (1362 – death 1370?)

== See also ==
- Catholic Church in China
