= Diocese of Yongping =

Roman Catholic diocese in China

Coordinates: 39°54′N 118°54′E

Diocese of Yongping Dioecesis Iompimensis 天主教永平教区

Location
- Country: China
- Metropolitan: Beijing

Information
- Rite: Latin Rite
- Cathedral: Cathedral of the Immaculate Conception in Tangshan

Current leadership
- Pope: Leo XIV
- Bishop: Peter Fang Jianping
- Metropolitan Archbishop: Joseph Li Shan

The Roman Catholic Diocese of Yongping/Lulong/Tangshan (Latin: Iompimen(sis), Chinese: 永平, 盧龍) is a Latin Church diocese in the ecclesiastical province of Beijing in China. Its seat is the Immaculate Conception Cathedral in Yongping (now Lulong, Tangshan 唐山, Hebei)

== History ==
- Established on December 23, 1899 as Apostolic Vicariate of Eastern Chi-Li 直隸東, on territory split off from the Apostolic Vicariate of Northern Chi-Li 直隸北境 (now Peking archdiocese)
- Renamed on December 3, 1924 as Apostolic Vicariate of Yongpingfu 永平府
- Promoted and renamed (exclusively after its see) on April 11, 1946 as Diocese of Yongping 永平

== Ordinaries ==
Apostolic Vicar of Eastern Chi-Li 直隸東

- Ernest François Geurts, C.M. (December 14, 1899 – December 3, 1924 see below), Titular Bishop of Rhinocorura (December 14, 1899 – July 21, 1940)

Apostolic Vicars of Yongpingfu 永平府

- Ernest François Geurts, C.M. (see above December 3, 1924 – July 21, 1940)
- Eugenio Lebouille, C.M. (July 21, 1940 – April 11, 1946), Titular Bishop of Conana (July 16, 1928 - April 11, 1946), succeeding as former Coadjutor Vicar Apostolic of Yongpingfu 永平府 (July 16, 1928 – July 21, 1940)

Suffragan Bishops of Yongping 永平

- Eugenio Lebouille, C.M. (see above April 11, 1946 – March 6, 1948), emeritate as Titular Bishop of Calama
- Apostolic Administrator Fr. John Herrijgers, C.M. (June 4, 1948 – ?)
- Lan Bo-lu (蘭柏露) (1958 – death July 28, 1976)
- Paul Liu Jinghe (劉景和) (1981 – November 2010)
- Peter Fang Jianping (方建平) (2010 - present), formerly Coadjutor Bishop of Yongping

== Sources and external links ==
- GCatholic.org, with incumbent biography links
- Catholic Hierarchy
