= Lodovico Buglio =

Italian Jesuit mathematician and missionary (1606–1682)

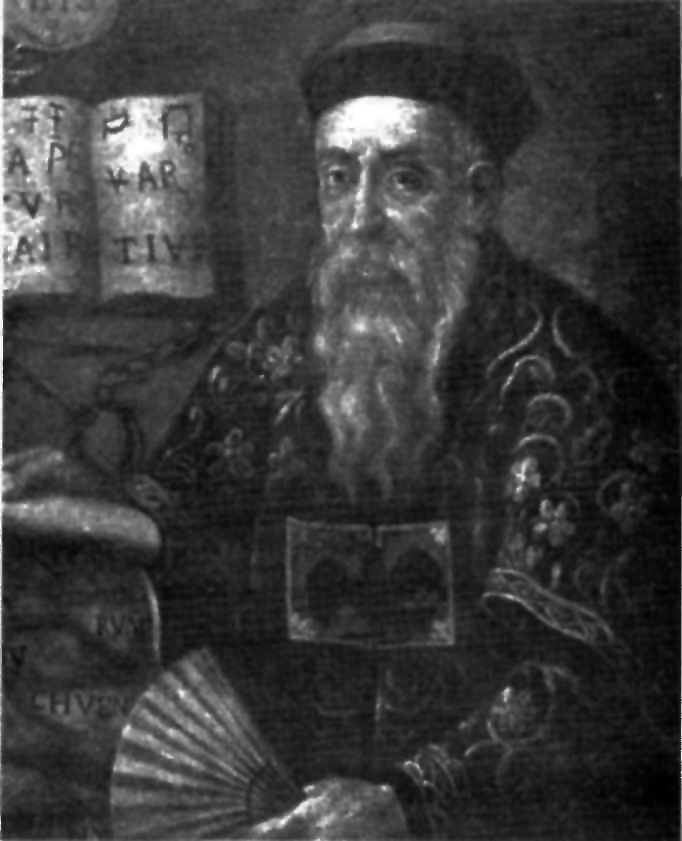
- Depiction of Buglio
- Born: January 26, 1606; Mineo, Kingdom of Sicily
- Died: 7 October 1682 (aged 76); Beijing, Manchu Empire
- Burial place: Zhalan Cemetery
- Occupations: Jesuit; mathematician; missionary; professor

Lodovico Buglio (26 January 1606 – 7 October 1682), Chinese name Li Leisi (Chinese: 利類思), was an Italian Jesuit mathematician and theologian. He was the first Catholic missionary to reach Sichuan, the then-westernmost province in China.

== Biography ==
Buglio was born in Mineo, in the Kingdom of Sicily, on 26 January 1606. He entered the Society of Jesus on 29 January 1622. After a career as a professor of the humanities and rhetoric in the Roman College, Buglio asked to be sent to the Chinese mission. Buglio was a Jesuit and studied the Chinese language in the late 1630s at speed, using the abbreviated course of study.

=== China ===
Buglio preached the Gospel in the provinces of Sichuan, Fujian, and Jiangxi. He and fellow Jesuit Gabriel de Magalhães were pressed to serve the rebel leader Zhang Xianzhong who had conquered Sichuan in 1644. After Zhang was killed by Hooge, he was taken to Beijing in 1648. Here, after a short captivity, he was left free to exercise his ministry. He suffered in the persecution which was carried on during the reign of the Kangxi Emperor.

Buglio collaborated with Fathers Johann Adam Schall von Bell, Ferdinand Verbiest and Gabriel de Magalhães in reforming the Chinese calendar, and shared with them the confidence of the emperor. He died in Beijing, on 7 October 1682, and was given a state funeral. He was buried in the Jesuits' Zhalan Cemetery in Beijing.

== Works ==
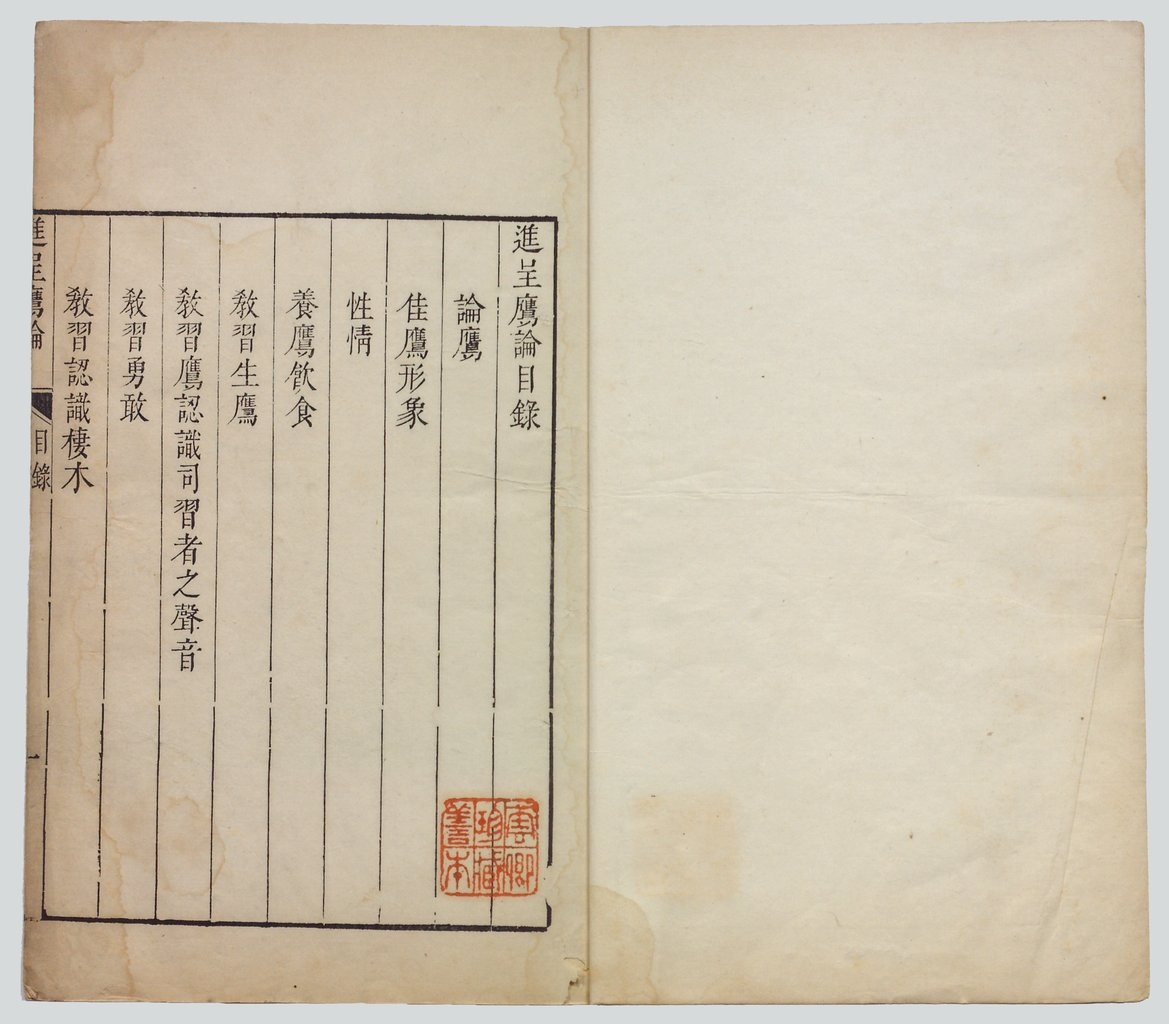
Title page of Jin cheng ying lun (Treatise on hawks) by Ulisse Aldrovandi translated by Ludovico Buglio (edition from the Qianlong era).

Buglio both spoke and wrote Chinese. A list of his works in Chinese, more than eighty volumes, written for the most part to explain and defend the Christian religion, is given in Carlos Sommervogel. Besides Parts I and III of the Summa Theologica of Thomas Aquinas, he translated into Chinese the Roman Missal (Peking, 1670) the Breviary and the Ritual (ibid, 1674 and 1675). These translations were part of the Jesuit project to introduce a liturgy in the Chinese tongue. The plan was approved by Pope Paul V, who, on 26 March 1615, granted to regularly ordained Chinese priests the faculty of using their own language in the liturgy and administrations of the sacraments; this faculty was never used. Father Philippe Couplet in 1681 tried to obtain a renewal of it from Rome, but was not successful.

== See also ==
- Catholic Church in Sichuan
- St. Joseph's Church, Beijing
- An Account of the Entry of the Catholic Religion into Sichuan
