= Raymond Wang Chong Lin =

- Bishop of Zhaoxian
- Native name: 王宠林
- Church: Catholic Church
- Diocese: Diocese of Zhaoxian
- In office: 9 March 1983 – 12 March 2006
- Predecessor: Stanislaus Min Xilian
- Successor: Joseph Jiang Mingyuan

Orders
- Ordination: 30 November 1950 by John Zhang Bi-de
- Consecration: 9 March 1983 by Casimir Wang Mi-lu

Personal details
- Born: 12 May 1921 present-day Ningjin County, Zhili, Republic of China
- Died: 2 February 2010 (aged 88)

Raymond Wang Chong Lin (Chinese: 王宠林; 12 May 1921 – 2 February 2010) was the Roman Catholic bishop of the Roman Catholic Diocese of Zhaoxian, China.

Ordained to the priesthood in 1950, Wang Chong Lin was secretly ordained bishop in 1983 and eventually was enthroned in a public ceremony.

Wang Chong Lin died of a cerebral hemorrhage on 2 February 2010.
