= Peter Fang Jianping =

His Excellency, The Most Reverend Fang Jianping
- Vice-President of the Bishops Conference of the Catholic Church in China (BCCCC)
- Native name: 方建平
- Archdiocese: Yongping
- Province: Beijing
- Installed: 19 December 2010

Orders
- Ordination: 1989 by John Liu Jinghe
- Consecration: January 6, 2000 by Joseph Liu Yuanren

Personal details
- Born: November 1962 (age 63) Guye District, Tangshan, Hebei, China
- Denomination: Roman Catholic
- Residence: Beijing, China
- Education: Hebei Provincial Catholic Theological College

Peter Fang Jianping (Chinese: 方建平; pinyin: Fāng Jiànpíng; born November 1962) is a Chinese Catholic prelate who has served as Bishop of Yongping since 2010. He is also vice president of the Bishops Conference of the Catholic Church in China.

He was a member of the 10th National Committee of the Chinese People's Political Consultative Conference and a delegate to the 11th and 12th National People's Congress.

== Biography ==
Fang was born in November 1962 in Guye District of Tangshan, Hebei, to a Catholic family. His ancestral home is located in Lulong County. In 1984 he entered the Hebei Provincial Catholic Theological College, where he graduated in 1988. On August 6, 1989, Fang was ordained a priest by the Bishop of Yongping, Paul Liu Jinghe.

On September 28, 1999, Fang was elected Coadjutor Bishop of Yongping. In November 2010 he was elevated as bishop, succeeding Jinghe.

On July 9, 2004, Fang was elected vice-president of Chinese Patriotic Catholic Association. On December 9, 2010, he was elected vice-president of the Bishops Conference of the Catholic Church in China.
