= Joseph Guo Jincai =

Chinese bishop of the Roman Catholic Church

His Excellency, The Most Reverend Guo Jincai
- Vice-President of Chinese Patriotic Catholic Association
- Native name: 郭金才
- Archdiocese: Diocese of Chengde
- Province: Hebei
- Diocese: Chengde
- Installed: 9 December 2010

Orders
- Ordination: by Fang Jianping

Personal details
- Born: February 1968 (age 58) Chengde, Hebei, China
- Denomination: Roman Catholic
- Residence: Beijing, China
- Education: Hebei Provincial Catholic Theological College
- Coat of arms

Joseph Guo Jincai (Chinese: 郭金才; pinyin: Guō Jīncái; born February 1968) is a Chinese Catholic prelate who has served as Bishop of Chengde since 2010. He is also vice-president of Chinese Patriotic Catholic Association and China Committee on Religion and Peace. He was a deputy to the 13th National People's Congress.

== Biography ==
Guo was born in Chengde, Hebei, in February 1968. He was illicitly made the Bishop of Chengde in 2010 by the Bishop of Yongping, Fang Jianping (Chinese: 方建平) that year. The consecration was made without consent of the pope and as a result, all involved were excommunicated latae sententiae. On December 9, 2010, Jincai was elected vice-president of Chinese Patriotic Catholic Association.

On September 22, 2018, Pope Francis lifted the excommunication of Jincai and other six bishops previously appointed by the Chinese government without a pontifical mandate.
