= Paul Liu (geologist) =

Jingpu "Paul" Liu is a geologist and professor at North Carolina State University. He is the College of Sciences’ first director of international affairs.

== Education ==
In 1992, Liu earned a B.E. (Hydrology and Engineering Geology, and Marine Geology) from the Ocean University of China. In 1995, he received an M.S. in Marine Geology from the Institute of Oceanology, Chinese Academy of Sciences. In 2001, he was awarded a Ph.D. in Geological Oceanography from the Virginia Institute of Marine Science, College of Williams & Mary.

== Research ==
His areas of research have included: fluxes and fates of river-derived sediments in the sea; riverine sediment dispersal, transport, and accumulation in different continental margin environments, in particular deltaic and clinoform deposits from large rivers in Asia, e.g. Yellow, Yangtze, Pearl, Red, Mekong, Irrawaddy, and Salween, etc.; the impacts of post-glacial sea-level changes; coastal environmental changes; and beach and delta erosions.

More recently, he has become active in NCSU's AI Hub for Science, conducting research on AI-LLM applications in geoscience, and authoring a book, How to Build and Fine‐Tune a Small Language Model: A Step-by-Step Guide for Beginners, Researchers, and Non-Programmers.

== Selected publications ==
- Flux and fate of Yangtze River sediment delivered to the East China Sea JP Liu, KH Xu, AC Li, JD Milliman, DM Velozzi, SB Xiao, ZS Yang Geomorphology 85 (3-4), 208-224 (2007) (Cited 896 times, according to Google Scholar)
- Holocene development of the Yellow River's subaqueous delta, North Yellow Sea . JP Liu, JD Milliman, S Gao, P Cheng Marine geology 209 (1-4), 45-67 (2004) (Cited 748 times, according to Google Scholar.)
- Stepwise decreases of the Huanghe (Yellow River) sediment load (1950–2005): Impacts of climate change and human activities. H Wang, Z Yang, Y Saito, JP Liu, X Sun, Y Wang, Global and Planetary Change 57 (3-4), 331-354 (2007) (Cited 693 times, according to Google Scholar.)
- Flux and fate of small mountainous rivers derived sediments into the Taiwan Strait JP Liu, CS Liu, KH Xu, JD Milliman, JK Chiu, SJ Kao, SW Lin Marine Geology 256 (1-4), 65-76 (2008)
- Dispersal of the Zhujiang River (Pearl River) derived sediment in the Holocene Q Ge, JP Liu, Z Xue, F Chu Acta Oceanologica Sinica 33 (8), 1-9 (2014)
- Stratigraphic Formation of the Mekong River Delta and Its Recent Shoreline Changes JP Liu, DJ DeMaster, TT Nguyen, Y Saito, VL Nguyen, TKO Ta, X Li Oceanography 30 (3), 72-83 (2017)
- A seismic study of the Mekong subaqueous delta: Proximal versus distal sediment accumulation JP Liu, DJ DeMaster, CA Nittrouer, EF Eidam, TT Nguyen Continental Shelf Research 147, 197-212 (2017)
- Sediment dispersal and accumulation off the Ayeyarwady delta–Tectonic and oceanographic controls SA Kuehl, J Williams, JP Liu, C Harris, DW Aung, D Tarpley, M Goodwyn, ... Marine Geology 417, 106000 (2019)
