= Giovanni Battista Buonamente =

Italian composer and violinist

Giovanni Battista Buonamente (ca. 1595 – 1642) was an Italian composer and violinist in the early Baroque era. He served the Gonzagas in Mantua until about 1622, and from about 1626 to 1630 served the Holy Roman Emperor Ferdinand II, Holy Roman Emperor in Vienna. Notably, in 1627 he played for the coronation festivities in Prague of Ferdinand III, son of the emperor. He then served as the violinist of Madonna della Steccata church in Parma. After a short service there, he arrived at his final position in 1633 of maestro di cappella at Assisi.

== Works ==
His work is characteristic of early Baroque style, as evidenced in his Sonata 6. Brass, which was popularized in an arrangement by Robert King.

- Il quarto libro de varie de sonate, sinfonie, gagliarde, corrente, e brandi per sonar con due violini & un basso di viola (Venice, 1626)
- Il sesto libro di sonate et canzoni... (Venice, 1636)
- Il settimo libro di sonate, sinfonie... (Venice, 1637)

== Literature ==
- Cavalier Giovanni Battista Buonamente: Franciscan Violinist; 2005 Peter Allsop; ISBN 1-84014-627-3
