= Teodorico Pedrini =

Italian Vincentian priest (1671–1746)

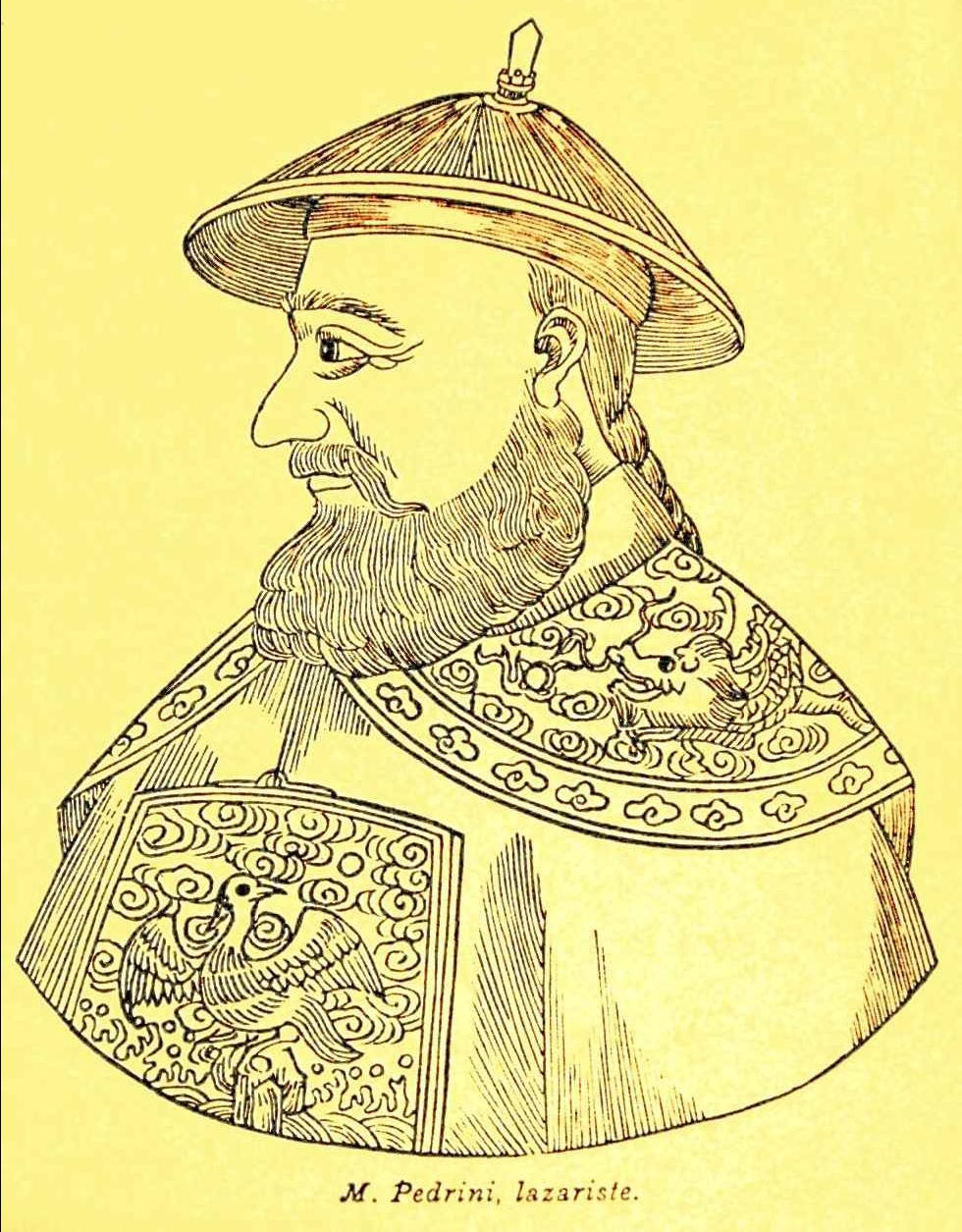
Teodorico Pedrini

Teodorico Pedrini, C.M. (June 30, 1671 – December 10, 1746), also known by his Chinese name De Lige (Chinese: 德理格), was an Italian Vincentian priest, musician and composer, but he was mainly a missionary at the imperial court of China for 36 years.

Pedrini was born in Fermo, in the Marche, then part of the Papal States. He was the founder of the Church of Our Lady of Mount Carmel, Beijing. He was the music teacher to three sons of the Qing dynasty's Kangxi Emperor, and he was co-author of the first treatise on Western Music theory ever written in Chinese: the LǜlǚZhèngyì-Xùbiān, later included in the Siku Quanshu.

== Biography ==
He was baptized Paolo Filippo Teodorico Pedrini on July 6, 1671, in the parish church of St. Michael the Archangel, in Fermo in the Marche.

His father, Giovanni Francesco Pedrini, who had been born in Servigliano on February 5, 1630, had worked as a notary in his native town for two years from 1654 to 1656, before going to Rome for ten years, as Chancellor for the Auditor Camerae. He then became the most important notary in Fermo, from 1669 to his death in 1707. Teodorico's mother was Nicolosa Piccioni, born in Fermo on March 14, 1650, daughter of another notary, Giovanni Francesco Piccioni, from Altidona.

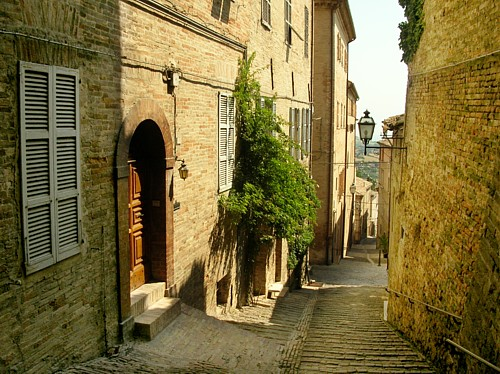
A view of the ancient city of Fermo, Italy, where Teodorico was baptized

Teodorico received his clerical Tonsure in 1687, and the minor orders in Fermo in 1690. He attended the University in Fermo, graduating in Utroque Iure on June 26, 1692. From November 16, 1692, to August 7, 1697, he lived in the Collegio Piceno in Rome. In this period he joined the Academy of Arcadia in 1696, where he received the name of Dioro Taumasio.

On December 21, 1697, he received the Subdiaconate; on February 23, 1698, he joined the Congregation of the Mission of St. Vincent de Paul (known as the Vincentians or Lazarists), in March 1698 he was ordained a deacon and two weeks later – on the Easter night of 1698 – presbyter, in the Basilica of St. John Lateran in Rome. In June 1698 he entered the Lazarist house of Santi Giovanni e Paolo in Rome, where he remained until January 1702, when he was sent to China, as a missionary of the Propaganda Fide, after meeting Pope Clement XI.

=== Journey to China ===
Pedrini's journey to China was very long, at first following the Via Francigena to Livorno, then by ship to Toulon, and then Paris, where the Nuncio was Filippo Antonio Gualterio, also born in Fermo.

Although selected as a member of the first papal legation of Patriarch Carlo Tommaso Maillard de Tournon, who had already left Spain for the Canary Islands, Pedrini never managed to join him, and, after waiting a year and a half, sailed from Saint Malo with other missionaries, on December 26, 1703, on a French ship heading to South America. The ship landed in Peru on December 31, 1704, and stayed there for more than one year. In 1705 he arrived in Mexico but only in March 1707 did he manage to sail from Acapulco, on a Manila galleon.

After reaching the Mariana Islands, Pedrini arrived in the Philippines, where he stayed for almost two years. In Mariveles he joined five other missionaries of the Propaganda Fide, among whom was Matteo Ripa (who later founded the Chinese College in Naples, now Università degli studi di Napoli L'Orientale), and together they reached Macau in January 1710. Here they met Cardinal Tournon, who recommended Pedrini as a musician at court, in answer to a request from Kangxi himself. After assisting him on his deathbed on June 8, 1710, they set off for Beijing, where they finally arrived on February 6, 1711.

=== Life in Beijing ===
Being, along with Matteo Ripa, the first non-Jesuit missionaries to settle at the Chinese court, 100 years after Matteo Ricci's death, in 1714 Pedrini spoke with the Kangxi Emperor about the Pope's decisions over the Chinese Rites, so he could send back to Rome the emperor's peaceful reactions on the matter. His reports to Rome met the negative reaction of the Jesuits, who strongly opposed the Decrees. This contrast marked all his missionary life, and led him to the dramatic events of 1721 when, at the end of the second Legation of the Patriarch Carlo Ambrogio Mezzabarba, he refused to sign the final document called Mandarin's Diary, and was imprisoned in the residence of the French Jesuits in Beijing until 1723. The Yongzheng Emperor set him free in February 1723 but the whole fact caused bitter polemics in Rome in the following years until 1730, which anticipated the final condemnation of the Chinese Rites, with the papal bull Ex Quo Singulari in 1742.

=== His last years ===
In 1723 Pedrini bought the residence at the Church of Our Lady of Mount Carmel, Beijing (popularly called Xitang or 'Western Church'), where he established the first non-Jesuit church in Beijing.

Towards the end of his life, Pedrini reconciled himself with the Jesuit missionaries, without denying his faithfulness to the Holy See, which had brought him so many problems in all his life, especially from 1714 to 1721.

Pedrini died during the night of December 10, 1746, in his house at the Church of Our Lady of Mount Carmel without ever returning to Italy, and was buried in the Jesuits' Zhalan Cemetery in Beijing, at the expense of the Qianlong Emperor.

Pedrini's gravestone, visible till the first part of last century in the wall of the All Saints Church, does not exist anymore.

== The mission and the music ==
Pedrini was a missionary in China from 1710 to 1746, the year of his death. His importance in the first half of the 18th century is connected with two main fields:

=== History of the church ===
The doctrinal issues involving the Mission in China in the period between the end of the 17th century and the beginning of the 18th century saw Teodorico Pedrini as one of its main characters.

The so-called Chinese rites controversy concerned the way in which the Christian religious practice was to be considered, especially in connection to the Chinese practice of Confucian origin, which the Jesuits, following Matteo Ricci's teaching, were willing to permit to the converted Christians.

Pedrini was one of the few missionaries who kept to the directives of the Holy See in that regard, which had repeatedly forbidden (first with the Decree Cum Deus Optimus in 1704, then with the bullae Ex Illa Die in 1715, and Ex Quo Singulari in 1742) the mixture of Christian and Confucian practices. His fidelity to the decisions of Rome brought beatings and imprisonment to Pedrini. In the most delicate period of the controversy, Pedrini was the main representative of Propaganda Fide in Beijing; in such a position he held regular epistolary contacts with the Vatican.

As missionary to the Chinese court, Pedrini carried out also another important project: in 1723 he bought a large residence where he opened to the cult the first non-Jesuit church in Beijing: the Church of Our Lady of Mount Carmel (Xitang or the "Western Church"). The church was destroyed twice after his death and was twice rebuilt. It is still standing nowadays, and after a recent restoration, it has been opened again exactly in the same place where Pedrini built it: at n° 130 of Xizhimennei Dajie, one of the largest avenues of the Chinese capital city, on the way between the Forbidden City and the Old Summer Palace, in those times the emperor's residence. Still readable on one of the sidewalls in the church, an inscription reminds the visitors of the name of its founder.

=== History of music and cultural relations between East and West ===
Besides being a priest, Pedrini was also a musician. This competence helped him first to be admitted to the court of the Chinese emperors and then to gain the favour of three successive emperors, ruling during his lifetime – the Kangxi Emperor (1662–1722), the Yongzheng Emperor (1722–1735) and the Qianlong Emperor (1735–1796). As a musician, Pedrini was the teacher of three sons of the Kangxi Emperor, and he constructed musical instruments and mended those present at court.

...he [the Kangxi Emperor] also used to write music notes, and let me review, giving me his own pen, he made me write on his desk, and we often played together the same harpsichord, each with one hand

— Teodorico Pedrini's letter of 1727

In addition, carrying on with the work of his predecessor, the Portuguese Jesuit Tomas Pereira, Pedrini completed the text of the first treatise on Western music theory ever published in China, the LǜlǚZhèngyì-Xùbiān, which was later included in the huge encyclopedic work called Siku Quanshu (1781).

With this work, Pedrini asserted himself as one of the main figures in the introduction of Western music in China.

Furthermore, Pedrini is the author of the only Western Baroque music compositions known in China in the 18th century: the Dodici Sonate a Violino Solo col Basso del Nepridi – Opera Terza whose original manuscript is still preserved in the National Library of Běijīng.

== Works ==
Dodici Sonate a Violino Solo col Basso del Nepridi – Opera Terza, in National Library of China; these scores were recorded in 1996 by the French group XVIII-21 Musique des Lumières directed by Jean-Christophe Frisch, with the title Concert Baroque à la Cité Interdite.

== Discography ==
- Concert baroque à la Cité interdite, Ensemble XVIII-21 Le Baroque Nomade, Jean-Christophe Frisch, audivis astrée
- Complete Violin Sonatas, Nancy Wilson (violin), Joyce Lindorff (harpsichord), paladino music

== Essential bibliography ==
- ALLSOP P.C. – LINDORFF J., Teodorico Pedrini: The Music and Letters of an 18th-century Missionary in China, in Vincentian Heritage, 27:2 (2008)
- ALLSOP P., "Teodorico Pedrini and the Ruin of the Christian Mission to China", Newcastle upon Tyne, 2023
- BAUDOUIN J., Le Mandarin blanc, Paris, 1999 – "Prix du Roman Historique 1999, Rendez-vous de l'histoire de Blois (France)"
- BRIZZI G. P. (edited by), L'Antica Università di Fermo, Fermo, 2001
- DI FIORE G., La Legazione Mezzabarba in Cina (1720–1721), Napoli, 1989
- DUVIGNEAU A.-B. CM, Teodorico Pedrini, Prete della missione, Musico alla corte imperiale di Pechino, Roma, 1946
- GALEFFI F. G. – TARSETTI G., Teodorico Pedrini e la Missione di Cina in La Voce delle Marche, supplement n. 1 January 13, 2006
- GALEFFI F. G. – TARSETTI G., Teodorico Pedrini nei Documenti degli archivi del’Archidiocesi di Fermo, in Quaderni dell'Archivio Storico Arcivescovile di Fermo, XXII, n. 44 (December 2007)
- GILD G., The Introduction of European Musical Theory during the Early Qing Dynasty. The achievements of Thomas Pereira and Theodorico Pedrini, in Monumenta Serica Monograph Series XXXV/2, Sankt Augustin, 1998
- GIMM M., Teodorico Pedrini, in Die Musik in Geschichte und Gegenwart, vol. 13, Kassel, 2005
- LINDORFF J., Teodorico Pedrini, in The New Grove Dictionary of Music and Musicians, London, 2001
- RIPA MATTEO, Giornale (1705–1724), edited by Michele Fatica, Napoli, 1991–1996
- SISTO ROSSO A. OFM, Apostolic Legations to China of the eighteenth century, P. D. and Ione Perkins, South Pasadena, 1948
- TASSI E., Teodorico Pedrini Missionario fermano alla corte imperiale cinese, in Quaderni dell’Archivio Storico Arcivescovile di Fermo , XX, n. 39 (June 2005)
- VIANI S., Istoria delle cose operate nella China da Monsignor Gio. Ambrogio Mezzabarba Patriarca d’Alessandria, Legato Appostolico in quell’Impero, e di presente Vescovo di Lodi, Parigi, 1739
- VON PASTOR L., History of the Popes, voll. XXXIII-XXXIV, St. Louis, 1941

== See also ==
- Chinese rites
- Chinese Religions
- Chinese History
- Roman Catholicism in China
