= Church of Our Lady of Mount Carmel, Beijing =

Church building in Beijing, China

Coordinates: 39°56′19″N 116°21′35″E

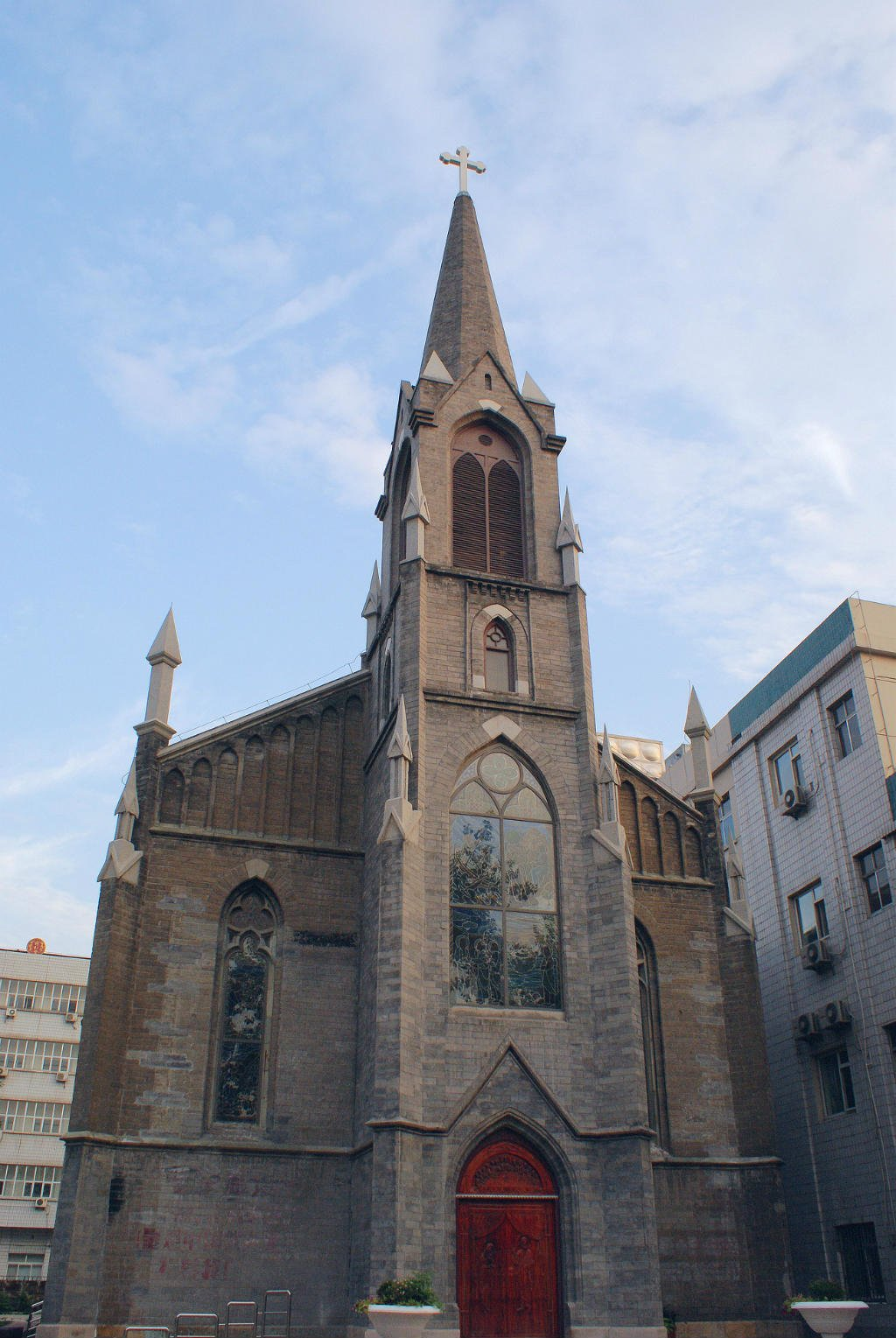
- The church after restoration

Alternative Chinese name
- Chinese: 西堂
- Literal meaning: The West Church
Transcriptions

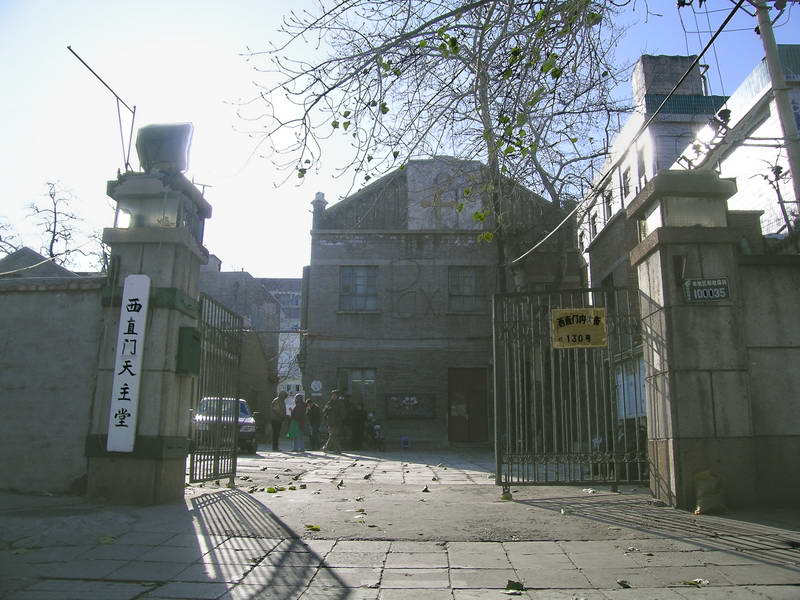
West Church before restoration

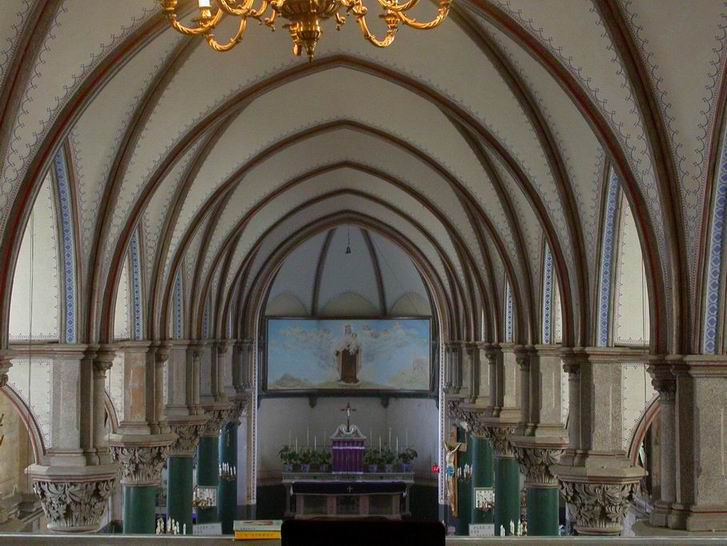
Interior of the church

The Church of Our Lady of Mount Carmel (Chinese: 圣母圣衣堂), more often colloquially referred to as Xizhimen Church (Chinese: 西直门天主堂), is a Roman Catholic church located on the southern side at No. 130 of Xizhimen Neidajie in Beijing. It is commonly referred to as Xitang (西堂, the West Church) to the locals.

== History ==
The church at Xizhimen was the last among the four historic Catholic churches in Beijing. The West Church was first built in 1723 during the Qing dynasty by the Italian Lazarist missionary Teodorico Pedrini: it was the first non-Jesuit church in Beijing. After Pedrini's death the church was run by Carmelites and then Augustinians, who were there when it was destroyed in 1811. The church was rebuilt in 1867. After a second destruction in 1900 during the Boxer Rebellion, it was built again in 1912 as we can see it today. It was then subsequently forced to close by the Chinese Communist authorities before reopening for worship in 1994 under the Chinese Catholic Patriotic Association.

Delicate Corinth pillars and Gothic peaked arches inside the church create a striking impression upon visitors.

There is Communist graffiti written on the church from the time of the Cultural Revolution, which the church deliberately retained as a reminder of the church during the Cultural Revolution. Mass is conducted in French every Sunday at 11 a.m. Attendees are often filmed by the Chinese People's Police and have to go through a metal detector to attend services. This sometimes causes delays for the start of services.

== Stone inscription ==
改建聖母聖衣堂碑記
竊維聖教永存蒼生洪濟數千年軼
廢軼興誠大主之仁慈靈佑在焉遣
使會司鐸德理格於一千七百二十
三年獨輸巨資購置斯基恭建
聖母七苦堂一座一千八百一十一年
適清嘉慶間聖教蒙難全堂被毀迨
至一千八百六十七年主教孟慕理
重為構築宏工鉅製規模一新詎意
一千九百年六月十五日遭拳匪之
禍本堂金司鐸遇害臺宇院落一炬
無遺一千九百十二年仁愛會脩女
博郎西耶氏復捐資新剏更易今名
落成之日北京林主教飭勒石以誌
顛末云爾
西曆一千九百十三年二月 勒石

D. O. M.
TEODORICUS PEDRINI. PRESB. CONGR. MISS., INFAN-
TIUM IMPERATORIS KANGHSI PRÆCEPTOR, AN. DOM. 1723
HUNC FUNDUM PROPRIO ÆRE EMIT, IN EOQUE ECCLESIAM
SUB AUSPICIIS SEPTEM DOLORUM B.M.V. DEO DEDICAVIT,
QUÆ TEMPORE PERSECUTIONIS KIATSING (1811) FUNDI-
TUS EST DESTRUCTA.
POSTEA A.D. 1867, ILL. DD. MOULY, C.M., HIC NOVUM SA-
CRUM ÆDIFICAVIT. QUOD DIE 15 JUNII 1900 BOXORES
FLAMMIS TRADIDERUNT, DUM PAROCHUM ECCLESIÆ
MAURITIUM DORE, C.M. SACERDOTEM CRUDELITER
TRUCIDANT.
TANDEM, ANNO DOMINI 1912 LARGITATE BENEMERITÆ
ROSALIÆ BRANSSIER, SOCIETATIS PUELLARUM CA-
RITATIS, TERTIA HÆC ECCLESIA SUB TITULO B.M. DE
MONTE CARMELO ÆDIFICATA EST.
IN QUORUM MEMORIAM ILL. DD. JARLIN, C.M., VIC. AP.
PEKINESIS, HUNC LAPIDEM EREXIT.

== See also ==
- Wangfujing Cathedral (Dongtang)
- Cathedral of the Immaculate Conception (Nantang)
- Xishiku Cathedral (Beitang)
