= Cathedral of the Immaculate Conception, Beijing =

Catholic cathedral in Beijing, China

Cathedral of the Immaculate Conception
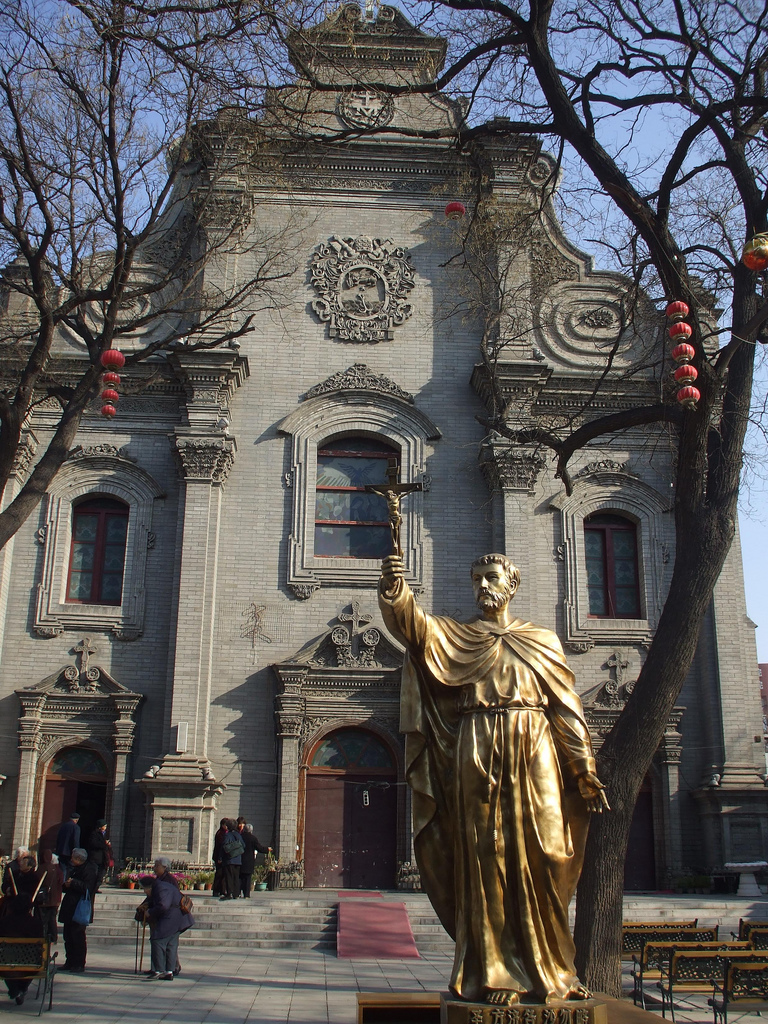
- The west façade

- Location within Beijing Location within China

Religion
- Affiliation: Archdiocese of Beijing

Location
- Location: 141 Qianmen Xidajie, Xuanwumen, Beijing 100031, P.R.China.
- Country: China
- Coordinates: 39.899034°N 116.368902°E

Architecture
- Completed: 1605

Cathedral of the Immaculate Conception, Beijing
- Traditional Chinese: 宣武門聖母無染原罪天主堂
- Simplified Chinese: 宣武门圣母无染原罪天主堂
Transcriptions
Standard Mandarin
- Hanyu Pinyin: Xuānwǔmén Tiān Zhǔtáng
- Wade–Giles: Hsuanwumen T'ien Chutang

Alternative Chinese name
- Chinese: 南堂 (The "South Church")
Transcriptions
Standard Mandarin
- Hanyu Pinyin: Nántáng
- Wade–Giles: Nantang

The Cathedral of the Immaculate Conception (Chinese: 圣母无染原罪堂), colloquially known as the Xuanwumen church (Chinese: 宣武门天主堂; pinyin: Xuānwǔmén Tiānzhǔtáng) or Nantang (Chinese: 南堂; lit. 'the South Church') to the locals, is a historic church and the former Cathedral church for the Archdiocese of Beijing located in the Beijing, China, Xicheng District, near the Beijing Financial Street. While the original foundation of the cathedral was in 1605, making it the oldest Catholic church in Beijing, the current building in Baroque style dates from 1904. The present Archbishop Joseph Li Shan, installed in September 2007, is one of the few Catholic bishops also recognised by the Catholic Patriotic Association.

The Cathedral was closed in December 2018 for renovations and was reopened in July 2022.

== History ==
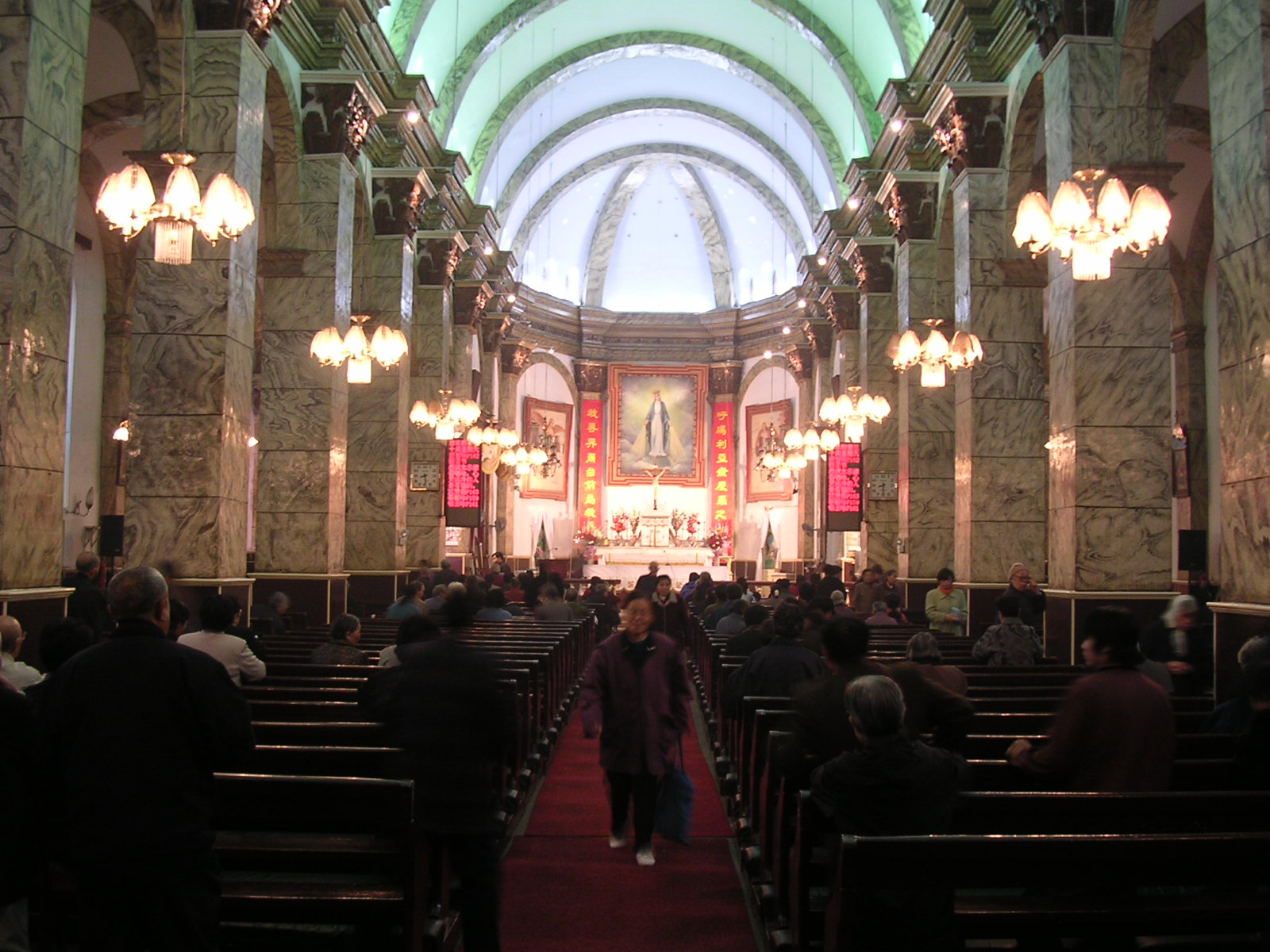
Interior of Nantang Cathedral

The Cathedral of the Immaculate Conception, as a foundation, dates back to 1605, in the 33rd year of the reign of the Wanli Emperor of the Ming dynasty. When the Italian Jesuit Matteo Ricci arrived in Beijing, the Wanli Emperor permitted him a residence slightly to the west of the site of the current cathedral, near Xuanwumen. Attached to this residence was a small chapel, in Chinese style, with only the presence of a cross atop the entrance to distinguish it as a church. This was at the time referred to as the Xuanwumen Chapel (宣武门礼拜堂).

In 1650, in the seventh year of the reign of the Shunzhi Emperor of the Qing dynasty, under the leadership of the German Jesuit Johann Adam Schall von Bell, work on a new church building was begun on the site of the Xuanwumen Chapel. Construction of was complete in two years, and the new church received the honour of a ceremonial gateway with the words 'Respect the Teachings of the Way of Heaven' (钦宗天道).

The Shunzhi Emperor was friendly to Schall and the church, visiting it no less than 24 times, bestowing upon it a stone stela with the words 'built by Imperial Order' (敕建) inscribed upon it.

In 1690, Beijing received its first Catholic bishop in three hundred years, the Franciscan Bernardin della Chiesa, and the church became a cathedral.

In 1703, in the 24th year of the reign of the Kangxi Emperor, the cathedral was enlarged and renovated, and after ten years, a European-style building was complete, the second European-style building in Beijing after the Canchikou Church. This was destroyed in 1720 by an earthquake in Beijing. A new cruciform structure was built in the baroque style, with a length of 86 metres and width of 45 metres. This was again severely damaged by an earthquake in 1730, in the eighth year of the reign of the Yongzheng Emperor, who donated 1,000 taels of silver towards its repair. The repaired cathedral had larger and taller windows, resulting in a brighter and grander interior.

The cathedral was damaged by fire in 1775, the 40th year of the reign of the Qianlong Emperor, who donated 10,000 taels of silver for restoration work, and also bestowed a calligraphed board in his own hand, inscribed with the characters '万有真原' on it, meaning 'The True Origin of All Things'.

In 1838, in the 14th year of the reign of the Daoguang Emperor, due to constant conflicts with the power and influence of the Catholic Church, for the sake of peace, the Qing government decreed a restriction of the activity of the Catholic Church in China. In this decree, the cathedral was confiscated by the government and remained such until the end of the Second Opium War, when the Catholic Church was again permitted to act freely. The cathedral was reopened in 1860 under the leadership of Bishop Joseph Martial Mouly.

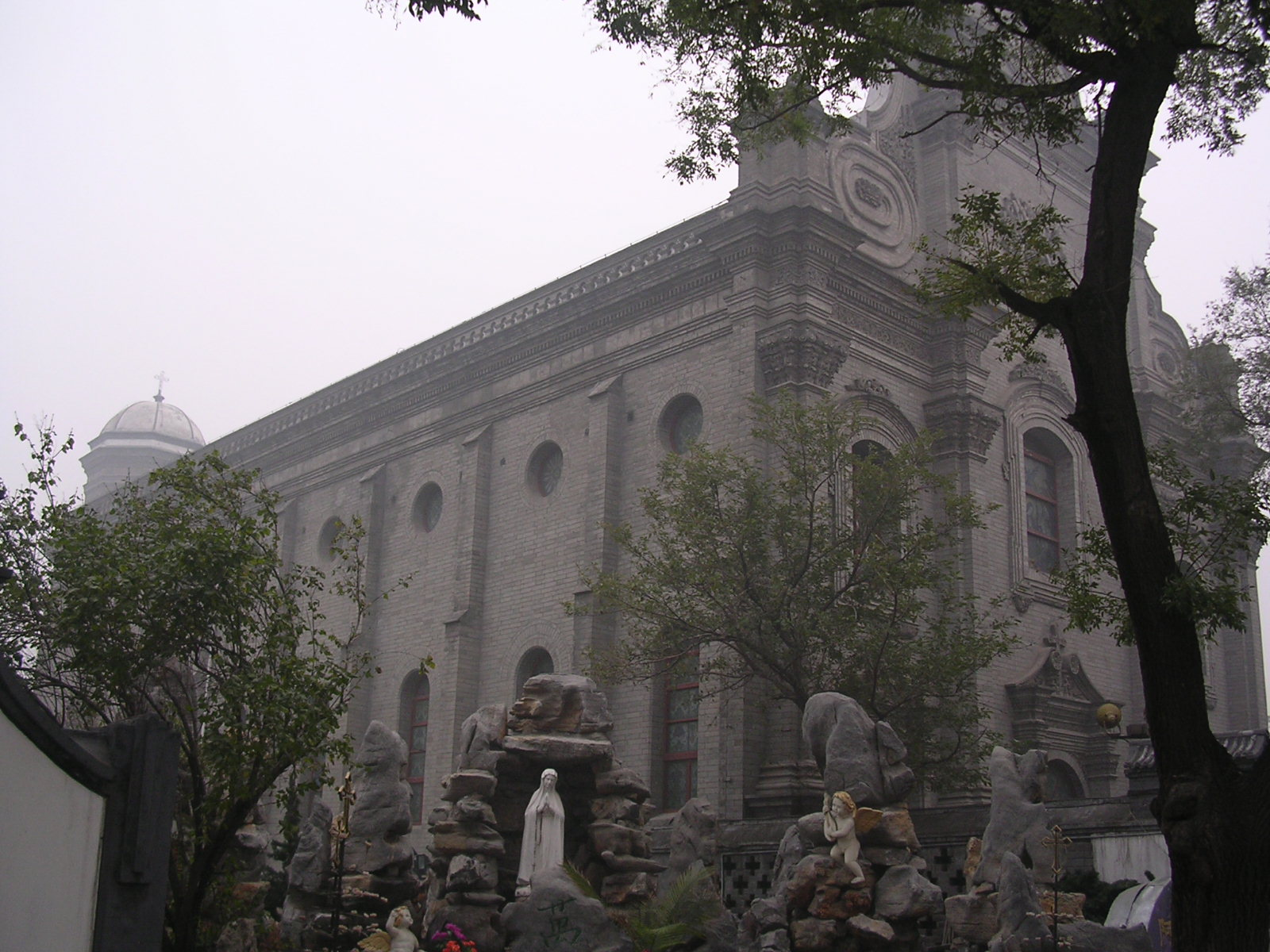
Nantang Cathedral from the northwest courtyard

When the Boxer Rebellion broke out in 1900, all the churches of Beijing were targets of vandalism, and on 14 June 1900, the cathedral was razed to the ground, together with most other churches of Beijing.

In 1904, the present structure, the fourth church on the site, was completed. The new construction included the coat of arms of Pope Pius X (the reigning pope at the time) on the upper middle front facade along with a symbol of the cross and a letter M at the top, representing Christ and the Virgin Mary, all of which are still visible.

On 21 December 1979, Bishop Michael Fu Tieshan was consecrated in the cathedral, the first major event in the life of the Catholic Church in China after the Cultural Revolution.

The cathedral is possibly the best known to foreigners in China, as English-language masses are celebrated there.

== Current masses ==
The cathedral is currently (April 2019) closed for renovation and the English Mass is being held at 14:00 (2 P.M.) in the North Church.

The Italian/Spanish mass is at 10:00 (10 A.M.) in an outbuilding of the South Cathedral.

There is a Chinese Mass at 08:30 (8:30 A.M.).

== Masses before the cathedral was closed for renovation ==
Masses are held in multiple languages. Weekday masses are held Monday to Saturday in Latin at 06:00, and then in Mandarin at 06:30 and 07:15. On Saturday, there is a vigil mass at 18:30 in Mandarin that is a "youth mass". On Sundays, there are mass in Latin at 06:00, and Mandarin at 07:00, 08:30, 16:00, and 18:00. There are masses in English with readings also in French at 10:30, and in Italian with Spanish readings at 12:30.

== See also ==
- Roman Catholic Marian churches
- Matteo Ricci
- Johann Adam Schall von Bell
- Xishiku Cathedral (Beitang)
- Wangfujing Cathedral (Dongtang)
- Xizhimen Church (Xitang)
- List of Catholic cathedrals in China
- List of Jesuit sites
