= Archdiocese of Beijing =

Roman Catholic archdiocese in China

Archdiocese of Beijing Archidioecesis Pechimensis 天主教北京总教区
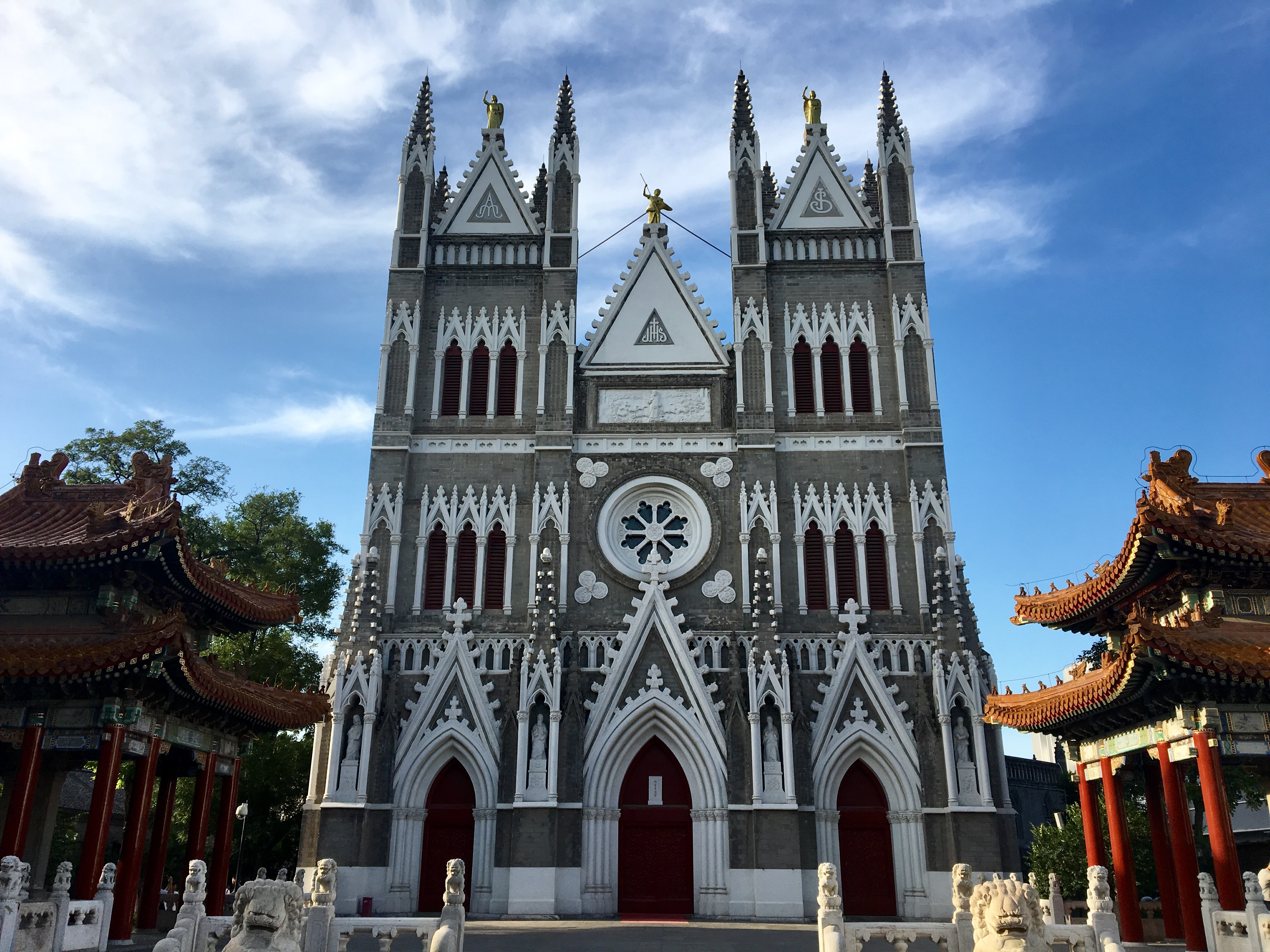
- Xishiku Church, The Cathedral of Beijing

Location
- Country: China
- Ecclesiastical province: Beijing
- Coordinates: 39.900798°N 116.374075°E

Statistics
- Area: 16,000 or 30,000 km^{2} (6,200 or 11,600 sq mi)
- Population: Total: Statistics Missing

Information
- Denomination: Catholic Church
- Sui iuris church: Latin Church
- Rite: Roman Rite
- Established: 1307
- Cathedral: Church of the Saviour, Beijing

Current leadership
- Pope: Leo XIV
- Metropolitan Archbishop: Joseph Li Shan
- Coadjutor: Matthew Zhen Xuebin

Website
- https://www.catholic-bj.cn/

Archdiocese of Beijing
- Chinese: 天主教北京总教区
Transcriptions
Standard Mandarin
- Hanyu Pinyin: tiān zhǔ jiào Běijīng zǒng jiàoqū
- Wade–Giles: T'iēnchǔchiào Pěichīng tsǔngchiàoch'ǘ
- Yale Romanization: tyān jǔ jyàu Běijīng dzǔng jyàuchyū

The Archdiocese of Beijing (Latin: Archidioecesis Pechimensis) is a Metropolitan Latin archdiocese in the People's Republic of China.

== Cathedral ==
Its cathedral was the Cathedral of the Immaculate Conception (South Church), located in the city of Beijing (Peking), which replaced the former cathedral, now the Holy Saviour Church (North Church), also in Beijing. The North Church was made into the archdiocese's cathedral again following the completion of renovations in 2018.

== Boundaries ==
The boundaries that the Chinese government across China has set for dioceses is often different from the historical boundaries for those dioceses previously approved by the Vatican. The current boundaries of the Archdiocese of Beijing according to the boundaries set by the Chinese government include all territory within the present boundaries of the provincial-level city of Beijing. The historic boundaries, however, include significant parts of neighbouring Hebei.

== History ==
- Established in 1307 as the Archdiocese of Khanbaliq under John of Montecorvino by Pope Clement V. See Catholic Church in China § Yuan dynasty (1271–1368).
- Lost territory twice: in 1313 to establish the Roman Catholic Diocese of Citong (刺桐) and in 1320 to establish the Roman Catholic Diocese of Ili-baluc.
- 1375: Suppressed
- Restored on April 10, 1690, as Diocese of Beijing, on territory split off from the Apostolic Vicariate of Nanjing
- Lost territory repeatedly: on September 9, 1831, to establish the Apostolic Vicariate of Korea, in 1838 to establish the Apostolic Vicariate of Liaotung (遼東), on September 3, 1839, to establish the Apostolic Vicariate of Shantung (山東) and on April 2, 1856, to establish the Apostolic Vicariate of Southwestern Chi-Li (直隸西南)
- May 30, 1856: Demoted to an exempt missionary pre-diocesan jurisdiction as Apostolic Vicariate of Northern Chi-Li
- Lost territory repeatedly again: on December 23, 1899, to establish the Apostolic Vicariate of Eastern Chi-Li (直隸東境), on February 14, 1910, to establish the Apostolic Vicariate of Central Chi-Li )直隸中境) and on April 27, 1912, to establish the Apostolic Vicariate of Coastal Chi-Li (直隸海濱)
- December 3, 1924: Renamed as Apostolic Vicariate of Beijing
- Lost territory on May 10, 1926: to establish the Apostolic Vicariate of Xuanhuafu (宣化府( and 1929.05.25 to establish the Mission sui juris of Yixian (易縣)
- April 11, 1946: Promoted as Metropolitan Archdiocese of Beijing.

== Ordinaries ==
- Metropolitan Archbishops of Beijing 北京
  - Archbishop Joseph Li Shan, (李山), (September 21, 2007 – present)
  - Archbishop Matthias Pei Shang-de, C.D.D. (June 29, 1989 – December 24, 2001)
  - Cardinal Thomas Tien Ken-sin, S.V.D. (田耕莘) (April 11, 1946 – July 24, 1967)
- Apostolic Vicars of Beijing 北京
  - Bishop Paul Leon Cornelius Montaigne, C.M. (满德胎) (January 27, 1933 – April 1946)
  - Bishop Stanislas Jarlin, C.M. (林懋德) (December 3, 1924 – January 27, 1933)
- Apostolic Vicars of Northern Chi-Li 直隸北境
  - Bishop Stanislas Jarlin, C.M. (林懋德) (April 5, 1905 – December 3, 1924)
  - Bishop Pierre-Marie-Alphonse Favier, C.M. (樊國樑) (April 13, 1899 – April 4, 1905)
  - Bishop Jean-Baptiste-Hippolyte Sarthou, C.M. (郁世良 / 都士良) (June 6, 1890 – April 13, 1899)
  - Bishop François-Ferdinand Tagliabue, C.M. (戴世濟 / 戴濟世) (August 5, 1884 – March 13, 1890)
  - Bishop Louis-Gabriel Delaplace, C.M. (田嘉璧 / 田類斯) (January 21, 1870 – May 24, 1884)
  - Bishop Edmond-François Guierry, C.M. (蘇鳳文 / 蘇發旺) (December 4, 1868 – January 21, 1870)
  - Bishop Joseph-Martial Mouly, C.M. (孟振生) (May 30, 1856 – December 4, 1868)
- Suffragan Bishops of Beijing 北京 (Latin Church)
  - Bishop Jean-Damascène Sallusti (1778 – 1781)
  - Bishop Joseph-Martial Mouly, C.M. (孟振生) (January 3, 1856 – May 30, 1856)
  - Bishop Joseph-Martial Mouly, C.M. (孟振生) (Apostolic Administrator April 28, 1846 – January 3, 1856)
  - Bishop Cayetano Pires Pireira, C.M. (畢學源) (Apostolic Administrator August 1827 – November 2, 1838)
  - Bishop Joaquim da Souza Saraiva, C.M. (July 6, 1808 – February 18, 1818)
  - Bishop Alexandre de Gouvea (Gouveia), T.O.R. (16 Dec 1782 – 6 Jul 1808)
  - Bishop Flaviano Giacomo Stefano Salustri, O.A.D. (20 Jul 1778 – 24 Sep 1781)
  - Bishop Polycarpo de Sousa (Souza), S.J. (19 Dec 1740 – 26 May 1757)
  - Bishop Francisco da Purificação da Rocha Froes, O.E.S.A. (21 Feb 1725 – 31 Jul 1731)
  - Bishop Bernardino (Antonio) della Chiesa, O.F.M. Ref. (10 Apr 1690 – 21 Dec 1721)
- Archbishops of Khanbalik 汗八里
  - Archbishop Nicolas da Botras, O.S.F. (尼古拉) (1333 – 1338)
  - Patriarch Giovanni da Montecorvino, O.F.M. (若望‧孟高维诺) (July 23, 1307 – 1328)
    - Auxiliary bishop Andrew of Perugia (1307 – 1318), named Bishop of Citing
    - Auxiliary bishop Andreuccio da Assisi, O.F.M. (1307 – died en route in India)
    - Auxiliary bishop Gerardo Albuini (1307 – 1313), named Bishop of Citing
    - Auxiliary bishop Nicolò da Banzia, O.F.M. (1307 – died en route in India)
    - Auxiliary bishop Peregrino da Castello (1307 – 1320), named Bishop of Citing
    - Auxiliary bishop Ulrico da Seyfridsdorf, O.F.M. (1307 – died en route in India)
    - Auxiliary bishop Guglielmo da Villanova (French: Guillaume de Villeneuve) (1307 – ?), named Bishop of Sagone in 1323)
    - Auxiliary bishop Tomaso (1310 – ?), one of three bishops appointed to replace the three bishops who died in India
    - Auxiliary bishop Pietro da Firenze (1310 – ?), one of three bishops appointed to replace the three bishops who died in India
    - Auxiliary bishop Girolamo Catalano (1311 – ?), one of three bishops appointed to replace the three bishops who died in India

== Province ==
Its ecclesiastical province comprises the Metropolitan's own archdiocese and the following Suffragan dioceses:

- Anguo 安國
- Baoding 保定
- Chengde 承德
- Daming 大名
- Jingxian 景縣
- Shunde 順得
- Tianjin 天津
- Xianxian 獻縣
- Xuanhua 宣化
- Yongnian 永年
- Yongping 永平
- Zhaoxian 趙縣
- Zhengding 正定

== See also ==
- Cathedral of the Immaculate Conception in Beijing
- Christianity in China
- Catholicism in China
- List of Roman Catholic dioceses in China
- List of Roman Catholic dioceses (structured_view)-Episcopal Conference of China
- Michael Fu Tieshan

== Sources and external links ==
- GCatholic.org
- Catholic Hierarchy
