= Joseph Li Shan =

Catholic bishop

The Most Reverend Joseph Li Shan
- Archbishop of Beijing
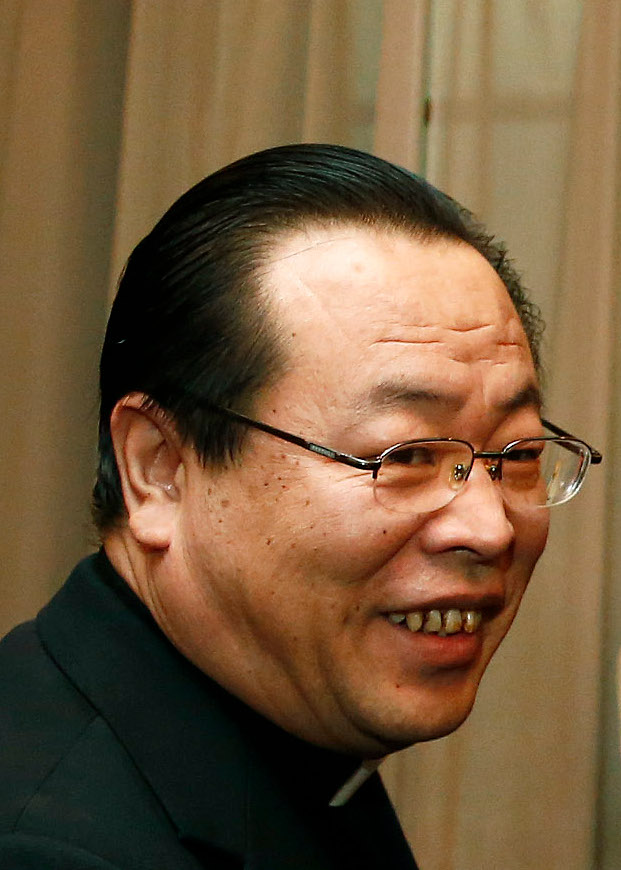
- Li in 2014
- Church: Catholic Church
- Archdiocese: Beijing
- Province: Hebei
- See: Beijing
- Predecessor: Matthias Pei Shangde
- Other post: Parish priest at St. Joseph's Church

Orders
- Consecration: 21 September 2007
- Rank: Archbishop

Personal details
- Born: March 1965 (age 61)
- Denomination: Catholic
- Motto: Omnia Omnibus (English: All things to all men) (Chinese: 对一切人，就成为一切; duì yī qiè rén， jiù chéng wéi yī qiè)
- Coat of arms: Joseph Li Shan's coat of arms

Joseph Li Shan (Chinese: 李山; pinyin: Lǐ Shān; born March 1965 in Daxing District, Beijing) is a Chinese Catholic prelate who serves as Archbishop of Beijing. He was consecrated a bishop on 21 September 2007, at age 42 at a ceremony at Nan Tang (South Cathedral) in Xuanwumen. His main consecrator to become bishop was John Fang Xingyao. Before becoming archbishop he served as parish priest of Saint Joseph's Church in Wangfujing.

Bishop Li Shan also serves as the President of the Chinese Catholic Patriotic Association.

== Biography ==
Li Shan was born in March 1965 in Daxing District, Beijing. His appointment as Archbishop of Beijing was tacitly approved by the Vatican. This approval was granted before his ordination, as happened for several other in the early years of the 21st century, unlike others, of an earlier period, of whom Pope Benedict XVI wrote that they, "under the pressure of particular circumstances, have consented to receive episcopal ordination without the pontifical mandate, but have subsequently asked to be received into communion with the Successor of Peter and with their other brothers in the episcopate. The Pope, considering the sincerity of their sentiments and the complexity of the situation, and taking into account the opinion of neighbouring Bishops, by virtue of his proper responsibility as universal Pastor of the Church, has granted them the full and legitimate exercise of episcopal jurisdiction."

He became a vice-president of the state-controlled Chinese Bishops' Conference and the Chinese Catholic Patriotic Association along with 16 other bishops who were assigned the same role in 2016. He became a representative on the Ethnic and Religious Affairs Committee for the 13th Chinese People's Political Consultative Conference in 2018. He became President of the Patriotic Association in 2022.

== Views ==
Li Shan has spoken publicly in support of the Chinese government's push for "Sinicization of religion" (宗教中国化) in China, including support for the church in China selecting bishops on its own. In 2019 he made an address at the Beijing Catholic Forum for Sinicization of Theology further illustrating these views. On the occasion, he said: "Catholicism tells us that love for one's country is the fourth commandment of the decalogue...Be subject to every human institution for the Lord's sake...Supporting the leadership of the Communist Party and fervently loving our socialist motherland is the basic premise for upholding our country's direction to Sinicize religion." He spoke favourably of the efforts made thus far to "sinicize" the church in China as well as the history of the church in China since the episcopal reforms in the late 1950s.

In April 2026, Li Shan gave the opening address at a national training session for the 'Sinicization of Catholicism'. He spoke of the need to deepen ideological understanding, including thorough studying of Xi Jinping's discourses on religion, adhering to core socialist principles, strengthening the rule of law and adherence to laws, seeking greater immersion of the church in Chinese culture and to promote Chinese characteristics within doctrines, rules and other things related to the church.

In August 2022, at the 10th National Congress on Catholicism in China, Li Shan was elected President of the Chinese Patriotic Catholic Association (CPCA), The congress issued a statement reaffirming its commitment to "Sinicization of Catholicism" (天主教中国化), independence of the church, and increasing patriotism.

In 2007, Pope Benedict XVI said the CPCA was at odds with the role of the international Catholic Church, though the two have since reconciled with a formal agreement that the CPCA select bishops, which are approved or vetoed by the Holy See.

The CPCA is closely aligned with the pro-"Sinicization" policies of General Secretary of the Chinese Communist Party Xi Jinping, promoting the "one direction, one road and one flag" position of the Chinese Communist Party.

Bishop Li Shan has done public prayer asking for diplomatic relations to be established between the Holy See and China.

On his 2023 visit to Hong Kong, he spoke of the importance of building unity between mainland Catholics and Catholics in Hong Kong, through evangelization efforts in line with "sinicization".

== Activities ==
2011

In 2011, Bishop Li Shan was co-consecrator along with six other bishops in a canonically illicit episcopal ordination for the bishop of Leshan. This act carried a possible penalty of excommunication for all involved, if they are considered imputable within the framework of canon law. The offence would not be imputable in canon law if the bishops who engaged in the act were coerced or under fear of coercion.

2021

On July 1, 2021, for celebrating the centenary celebrations of the founding of the Chinese Communist Party (CCP), Bishop Li Shan organized a watch party of CCP general secretary Xi Jinping's speech at the bishop's residence in Beijing.

In September 2021, he served as co-consecrator for Cui Qingqi's appointment as the new bishop of Wuhan. The appointment was done within the framework of the Sino-Vatican agreement.

On Christmas 2021, Bishop Li Shan announced a year for the 'Son of God', which followed 2021's 'Year of God'. The parishes in Beijing, which had suffered many closures due to Covid restrictions, reportedly developed their own pastoral programs to put into practice for celebrating this special year.

2022

For Lent 2022, while churches in Beijing remained closed due to Covid restrictions, Bishop Li Shan issued a pastoral letter for Lent encouraging the faithful to engage in "abstinence from speech, eyes, ears, internet, bad temper and negative temperament". He also said to overcome the pandemic and its challenges "we need even more the power of faith". He also made a commitment to "accompany catechumens to live a life of holiness, incarnating the image of Jesus Christ".

On July 16, 2022, Bishop Li Shan held a mass at the North Cathedral where more than 100 people were initiated into the church. This was the first day that the church had been re-opened after having been closed since January of that year due to COVID restrictions.

On July 24, 2022, to celebrate the World Day of Grandparents and the Elderly, Bishop Li Shan held a special mass and did group photos as well as gave small symbolic gifts.

On August 15, 2022, the solemnity of the Assumption of the Virgin Mary, he gave mass at the North Cathedral in Beijing and said on the occasion: "We must imitate the fidelity and humility of Our Lady in our daily life and always pray according to her example".

In August 2022, he attended the 10th National Congress on Catholicism in China, where he was elected as President of the Patriotic Association. The congress issued a statement reaffirming its commitment to several principles including the "Sinicization of Catholicism" in China, independence of the church, increasing patriotism, as well as implementing the plans for the church made at the congress and to assimilate the spirit of the Central United Front Work Conference and the National Religious Work Conference, which had taken place in December of the previous year.

At the end of December 2022, the Beijing archdiocese announced that churches were going to be reopened on January 1. They had been previously shut down due to COVID restrictions. Bishop Li Shan gave a dispensation to the elderly, the seriously ill and people infected with Covid from Sunday Mass.

2023

In February 2023, it was reported that Bishop Li Shan had given mandate to 11 extraordinary ministers of communion in Beijing to distribute communion to the homes of sick and elderly.

Bishop Stephen Chow of the diocese of Hong Kong came to Beijing in April 2023 at Bishop Li Shan's invitation. This was the first time a Hong Kong bishop had visited the mainland for decades. Bishop Chow also said that he had invited Li Shan to come to visit Hong Kong.

In April 2023, Bishop Li Shan attended the installation of the new bishop of Shanghai and gave the address. The installation was not conducted with the Holy See's approval.

For the Day of Vocations 2023, Li Shan asked priests to put calls to the priesthood and religious life at the centre of their homilies.

On the feast of Saint Mark in 2023, Bishop Li Shan ordained a man to the priesthood. On the occasion he called on the newly ordained "to follow the example of Christ, the eternal High Priest, and to fulfill his duties as a minister and the task of sanctification with joy and love, to serve the faithful and work for the salvation of souls, following in the footsteps of the Good Shepherd by devoting himself to the edification of the family of the Church".

For the Feast of the Sacred Heart in 2023, he visited a parish in Yongning that was celebrating its 150th year anniversary. On the occasion he called on people 'to dedicate themselves, their families and their parishes to the Sacred Heart of Jesus'

On July 16, 2023, Bishop Li visited the Xizhimen Church and held a special mass in celebration of the parish's 300-year anniversary.

At the end of July 2023, Bishop Li Shan and other bishops held a meeting in Pingliang regarding the compilation of "unified teaching materials". The meeting was reportedly arranged by the Seminary Department of the CCPA and the Chinese Catholic Bishops’ Conference (BCCCC).

In August 2023, Bishop Li welcome four new postulants into the Beijing-based religious order, the Sisters of Saint Joseph. The bishop spoke that only in joy can the baptized accept their mission.

In November 2023, Bishop Li visited Hong Kong as a reciprocal visit after Hong Kong's Bishop Chow visited Beijing earlier in the year.

On December 30, 2023, Bishop Li Shan inaugurated a new church dedicated to St John in Beijing's Economic-Technological Development Area.

2024

On January 31, 2024, Bishop Li Shan served as the principal consecrator of Bishop Wu Yishun when the latter became bishop of the Apostolic Prefecture of Shaowu.

On February 5, 2024, Bishop Li Shan attended and spoke at a meeting of Chinese religious leaders organized by the United Front Work Department and chaired by Wang Huning. The meeting discussed goals for Chinese religious organizations, including the implementation of the Five Identifications within the organizations.

In June 2024, Bishop Li Shan hosted Belgian Cardinal Jozef De Kesel and a delegation of others in Beijing, where they met with him and other Chinese bishops. The meeting followed the visit of several Chinese bishops to Europe in 2023.

In July 2024, Bishop Li Shan and Bishop Stephen Xu Hongwei of Hangzhou concelebrated a mass at the Beijing seminary on the occasion of the graduation of 20 students.

In September 2024, Bishop Li Shan and Shanghai Bishop Joseph Shen Bin requested for the Chinese Catholic charity 'Jinde' to carry out relief efforts following the devastation of Typhoon Yagi in Hainan.

In October 2024, Bishop Li Shan and four other bishops ordained Matthew Zhen Xuebin as coadjutor bishop for Beijing. No official explanation was provided for the need for a coadjutor, since Bishop Li Shan was only 59 years old at the time (bishops normally retire at the age of 75). According to some sources, Bishop Li Shan requested the appointment himself and suggested Fr Zhen Xuebin, who had long been his closest aide in administering the diocese.

In December 2024, Bishop Li Shan and Bishop Matthew Zhen Xuebin presided over the mass to inaugurate the jubilee year at the North Cathedral in Beijing.

2025

In March 2025, shortly following the end of the "Two Sessions" annual government meeting in Beijing, the National Religious Groups Joint Conference took place in Beijing. Many religious leaders, including Bishop Li Shan attended. The Conference ordered for religious bodies in China to coordinate their preaching and studying around the texts and spirit of the Two Sessions. Bishop Li Shan gave a speech at the event.

In May 2025, Bishop Li Shan visited Housangyu village (后桑峪天主堂) and presided over a mass there in honour of the Virgin Mary for the month of May.

In May 2025, Bishop Li Shan attended a week-long training hosted by the United Front Work Department aimed at getting Chinese religious leaders to spread "traditional Chinese culture" and the state-sponsored Sinicization policy. Bishop Li Shan was one of the speakers at the event.

In July 2025, Bishop Li Shan conferred the missionary mandate seminarians at the Major Seminary of Beijing archdiocese. On the occasion he said "the Seminary is the heart of the diocese. It is a place for the formation of outstanding vocations for the Church".

In September 2025, Bishop Li Shan led the ordination service for Joseph Wang Zhengui of the newly-recognized Diocese of Zhangjiakou.

In September 2025, Bishop Li Shan opened the Beijing seminary for the academic year and called on seminarians to ask for the gifts of the Holy Spirit.

Bishop Li Shan sponsored a 'synodal half marathon' along the banks of the Wenyu River in October 2025.

For All Souls Day 2025, Bishop Li Shan celebrated a special mass at a Catholic cemetery in Beijing.

In December 2025, Bishop Li Shan consecrated Francis Li Jianlin as the new bishop of Xinxiang.

2026

In July 2026, Bishop Li Shan spoke at a diocesan retreat for priests in which he called for priests to carry out evangelization with dedication.

In July 2026, Bishop Li Shan gave an address at a meeting of 36 superior generals of Chinese female religious organizations that was held at the National Seminary of Catholic Church in China. During his remarks, he quoted Christ's words about being the salt of the earth and the light of the world.

In July 2026, Jinde Charities, on behalf of Bishop Li Shan, engaged in humanitarian relief in Hubei and Jiangxi following weather-related natural disasters.

== See also ==
- Joseph Ma Yinglin
- Joseph Liu Xinhong
- Zhan Silu

Catholic Church titles
Preceded by Michael Fu Tieshan	Archbishop of Beijing; 2007–present	Incumbent
