= Christianity in Jilin =

Christianity is a minority religion in Jilin, a province of China. St. Theresa's Cathedral and Changchun Christian Church exist in Changchun. Kim-Jong-il visited a Catholic church in the province in 2010. There were raids against many house churches of Jilin in 2005. At least 600 were arrested. The province has hundreds of thousands of Protestants. The number of Protestants decidedly exceeds that of the Catholics. Several churches in Yanbian Korean Autonomous Prefecture have been reportedly shut down. Jilin City has a Catholic church built after Gothic models.

== List of Roman Catholic dioceses with seat in Jilin ==
- Roman Catholic Diocese of Jilin
- Roman Catholic Diocese of Sipingjie
- Roman Catholic Diocese of Yanji

== See also ==
- Christianity in Jilin's neighbouring provinces
  - Christianity in Heilongjiang
  - Christianity in Inner Mongolia
  - Christianity in Liaoning
