= Joseph Julian Oste =

- Bishop of the Roman Catholic Diocese of Jehol
- Archdiocese: Roman Catholic Archdiocese of Shenyang
- Diocese: Roman Catholic Diocese of Jehol
- Installed: April 9, 1948
- Term ended: January 19, 1971
- Predecessor: Louis Janssens
- Successor: Position revoked

Orders
- Ordination: November 21, 1920

Personal details
- Born: March 28, 1893 Zele, Flemish Region, Belgium
- Died: January 19, 1971 (aged 77) Belgium
- Denomination: Roman Catholic

Joseph Julian Oste (Chinese: 德化隆; pinyin: Dé Huàlóng; March 28, 1893 – January 19, 1971) was a Belgian Catholic priest, missionary, and Bishop of the Roman Catholic Diocese of Jehol between 1948 and 1971.

== Biography ==
Joseph Julian Oste was born in Zele, Flemish Region, Belgium, on March 28, 1893. He joined the CICM Missionaries in 1912. He was ordained a priest on November 21, 1920. He came to China to preach in 1921. After Louis Janssens's resignation, he was appointed Bishop of the Roman Catholic Diocese of Jehol. He was consecrated on October 28.

In December 1953, the Communist government expelled him from China, he arrived in British Hong Kong by a cruise ship from Tianjin and preached there for 17 years. He returned to Belgium in 1970.

On January 19, 1971, he died of leukemia, aged 77.

Catholic Church titles
Preceded by Louis Janssens	Bishop of the Roman Catholic Diocese of Jehol; 1948–1971	Succeeded by Position revoked
