= Christianity in Liaoning =

Christianity is a minority religion in Liaoning, a province of the People's Republic of China. Multimillionaire Leung Moon-Lam intended to build a theme park on the Bible there. The number of Christians in the province has increased dramatically since the Cultural Revolution, having been at about 60,000 in 1965. A significant minority are of Korean origin. The number of registered churches and meeting points exceeds 1000. The number of Protestants exceeds half a million. The number of Christians in Shenyang was estimated to be 200,000 as of 2000. An estimate for 1996 was 70,000. Shenyang has North East Theological Seminary. Liaoning has a far lower number of arrests of Christians than other provinces. Dalian had about 1% Christians in 2003. Fuxin has a Christian population estimated at below 1%.

== Roman Catholic dioceses with seat in Liaoning ==
- Roman Catholic Archdiocese of Shenyang
- Roman Catholic Diocese of Fushun
- Roman Catholic Diocese of Yingkou

== See also ==
- Christianity in Liaoning's neighbouring provinces
  - Christianity in Hebei
  - Christianity in Inner Mongolia
  - Christianity in Jilin
