= Conrad Abels =

20th-century Dutch Catholic bishop in China

- Vicar Apostolic of Jehol
- Archdiocese: Archdiocese of Shenyang
- Diocese: Diocese of Jehol
- Installed: July 5, 1897
- Term ended: February 4, 1942
- Predecessor: Théodore-Herman Rutjes
- Successor: Louis Janssens

Orders
- Ordination: March 29, 1879

Personal details
- Born: January 31, 1851 Netherlands
- Died: February 4, 1942 (aged 91) Republic of China
- Denomination: Roman Catholic

Conrad Abels (simplified Chinese: 叶步司; traditional Chinese: 葉步司; pinyin: Yè Bùsī; January 31, 1856 – February 4, 1942) was a Dutch priest, missionary, and Vicar Apostolic of Jehol. He was a member of the CICM Missionaries.

== Biography ==
Conrad Abels was born in the Netherlands, on January 31, 1856. He was ordained a priest on March 29, 1879. He came to preach in Inner Mongolia in March 1881. On July 5, 1897, he was appointed Vicar Apostolic of Jehol by the Holy See. In 1900, Conrad Abels and his believers successfully defended the line against repeated Boxer assaults.

On February 4, 1942, he died at the cathedral, aged 91.

Catholic Church titles
Preceded by Théodore-Herman Rutjes	Vicar Apostolic of Jehol; 1897–1942	Succeeded by Louis Janssens
