= Andrew Han Jingtao =

Chinese bishop (1921–2020)

- Bishop of the Roman Catholic Diocese of Sipingjie
- Archdiocese: Roman Catholic Archdiocese of Shenyang
- Diocese: Roman Catholic Diocese of Sipingjie
- Installed: 1982
- Predecessor: Paul Zhang

Orders
- Ordination: December 14, 1947
- Consecration: 1986

Personal details
- Born: July 26, 1921 Jilin, Republic of China
- Died: December 30, 2020 (aged 99) China
- Denomination: Roman Catholic

Andrew Han Jingtao (simplified Chinese: 韩井涛; traditional Chinese: 韓井濤; pinyin: Hán Jǐngtāo; born 26 July 1921 – 30 December 2020) was a Chinese Catholic clandestine Bishop of the Roman Catholic Diocese of Sipingjie since 1982 until his death in 2020.

== Biography ==
Han was born in Jilin on July 26, 1921. Some documents record his birth year as 1919 or 1923. After studying, he was ordained a priest on December 14, 1947.

During the rule of Mao Zedong, he was arrested by the Communist government and sent to labor in labor camps. It was not until 1980, after Deng Xiaoping took power and became more open to religion, and he was released. He became a professor of Latin and Greek culture at Northeastern University in Changchun until he retired in 1987.

In 1982, he was secretly appointed as the Bishop of the Roman Catholic Diocese of Sipingjie. Four years later, his ordination was also silently held on May 6, 1986. He was a supporter of the Legions of Mary and founder of the Women's Congregation of Mount Calvary.

He was an underground bishop, but he repeatedly expressed his support for spiritual reconciliation between "underground church" and "open church" Catholics.

Catholic Church titles
Previous: Paul Zhang	Bishop of the Roman Catholic Diocese of Sipingjie; 1982–2020	Vacant
