= Christianity in Inner Mongolia =

Christians are a minority in the Inner Mongolia region of the People's Republic of China. There are Eastern Orthodox Churches in Labdarin, Manzhou, and Hailar. The Shouters are active in Inner Mongolia. About 100,000 Chinese Christians were in the region in 1993. The region has few Mongolian Christians. Numerous house church leaders were detained in Xilinhot in 2008. Inner Mongolia is an area of rapid growth of Protestantism. Religious Affairs Bureau staff have declared a Christmas gathering in Duolun County illegal in 2006. Inner Mongolia Bible School (formerly Inner Mongolia Training Class) was founded in 1987. Inner Mongolia has more than 170,000 Protestants and over 1,000 official churches. Tongsun Street Church was started with the help of Swedish missionaries around 1900. According to Tjalling Halbertsma, Christians used to live in Inner Mongolia before 1206. Hohhot used to have or has a very large house church with more than 1500 church members. Protestantism entered the region in the late 19th century. Due to the Dungan Revolt (1895–96), the western Inner Mongolian Han Chinese Catholic village Xiaoqiaopan had defensive procedures instituted by the Belgian Priests in charge. Missionaries were killed during the Boxer Rebellion in 1900. The French Catholic vicar apostolic, Msgr. Alfons Bermyn, wanted foreign troops garrisoned in inner Mongolia, but the Governor refused. Bermyn petitioned the Manchu Enming to send troops to Hetao where Prince Duan's Mongol troops and General Dong Fuxiang's Muslim troops allegedly threatened Catholics. It turned out that Bermyn had created the incident as a hoax. In Fengzhen, a church was founded as early as 1892. Most Christians in Inner Mongolia are Han Chinese.

== Catholicism ==
The area is served by the Archdiocese of Suiyuan, the Diocese of Chifeng, and the Diocese of Jining, with four bishops appointed by the Chinese Patriotic Catholic Association.

Inner Mongolia has some Catholic villages and an underground Catholic seminary. Several priests of the underground Catholic Church had been arrested in 2007.

There are more than 200,000 Catholics in Inner Mongolia, and at least 32 Catholic churches and 100 home meetings. The Catholic Church there has a history of over 120 years. During the Boxer Rebellion, more than 2000 Catholics were murdered in Inner Mongolia.

Priests who tried to prevent the demolition of the only Catholic church of Ordos were arrested.

== See also ==
- Christianity in Mongolia
- Christianity among the Mongols
- Christianity in Inner Mongolia's neighbouring provinces
  - Christianity in Hebei
  - Christianity in Heilongjiang
  - Christianity in Jilin
  - Christianity in Liaoning
  - Christianity in Shaanxi
