= Jehol =

Jehol, an irregular romanization of Chinese (熱河兒), Mongolian, or Manchu, may refer to:

- Jehol Province
- Jehol (city), a former name of the city now known as Chengde
- Jehol Mountains, now usually known as the Yin Mountains
- Jehol Biota, a fossilized Early Cretaceous ecosystem
- Roman Catholic Diocese of Jehol
