= Théodore-Herman Rutjes =

- Vicar Apostolic of Eastern Mongolia
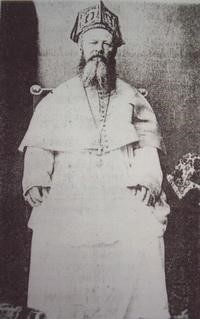
- Archdiocese: Roman Catholic Archdiocese of Shenyang
- Diocese: Roman Catholic Diocese of Jehol
- Installed: December 11, 1883
- Term ended: August 4, 1896
- Predecessor: New title
- Successor: Conrad Abels

Orders
- Ordination: December 22, 1866

Personal details
- Born: December 11, 1833 Netherlands
- Died: August 4, 1896 (aged 62) Rehe Province, Qing China
- Denomination: Roman Catholic

Théodore-Herman Rutjes (simplified Chinese: 吕继贤; traditional Chinese: 呂繼賢; pinyin: Lǚ Jìxián; December 11, 1833 – August 4, 1896) was a Dutch priest, missionary, and Vicar Apostolic of Eastern Mongolia.

== Biography ==
Théodore-Herman Rutjes was born in the Netherlands, on December 11, 1833. He was ordained a priest on December 22, 1866. He joined the CICM Missionaries in his early years, and later was sent to preach in Inner Mongolia. On December 11, 1883, the Apostolic Vicariate of Eastern Mongolia was founded and he was appointed Vicar Apostolic.

On August 4, 1896, he died at the Cathedral, aged 62.

Catholic Church titles
New title	Vicar Apostolic of Eastern Mongolia; 1883–1896	Succeeded by Conrad Abels
