= Basile De Loose =

Belgian painter (1809–1885)

Basile De Loose (17 December 1809 – 24 December 1885) was a Belgian painter.

He was born in Zele, East Flanders, First French Empire, on 17 December 1809, to Johannes Josephus de Loose. Also his father was a painter. Twelve paintings by his father hang in the church of Zele, where also one painting by Basile De Loose is located (The Way of the Cross). He was trained in Antwerp and by 1835 was active in Paris. De Loose was trained by his father, and was also a pupil of Mattheus Ignatius van Bree.

He died in Brussels on 24 December 1885.

== Gallery ==
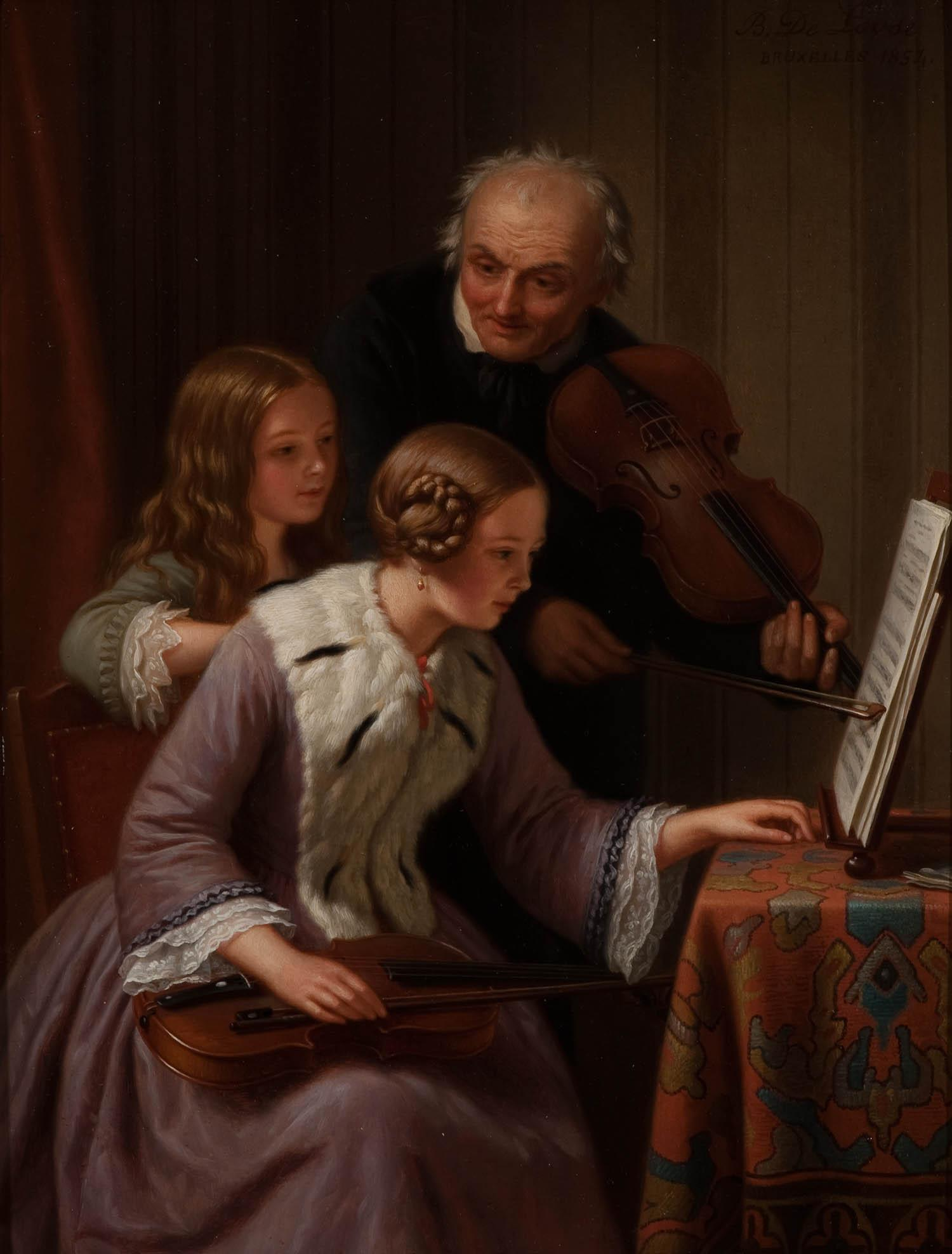
The Music Lesson, oil on panel, 1854

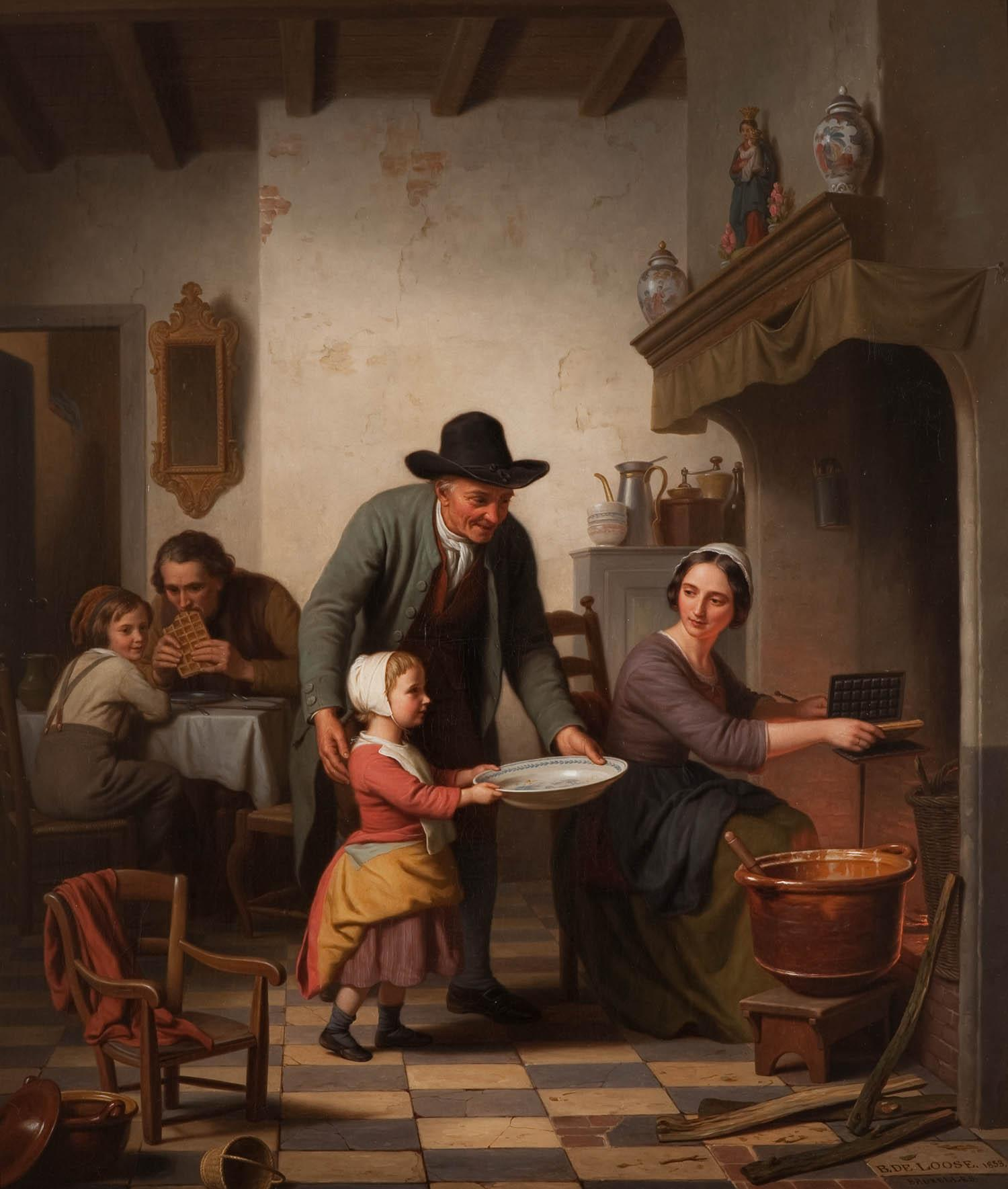
Making Waffles, oil on canvas, 1853

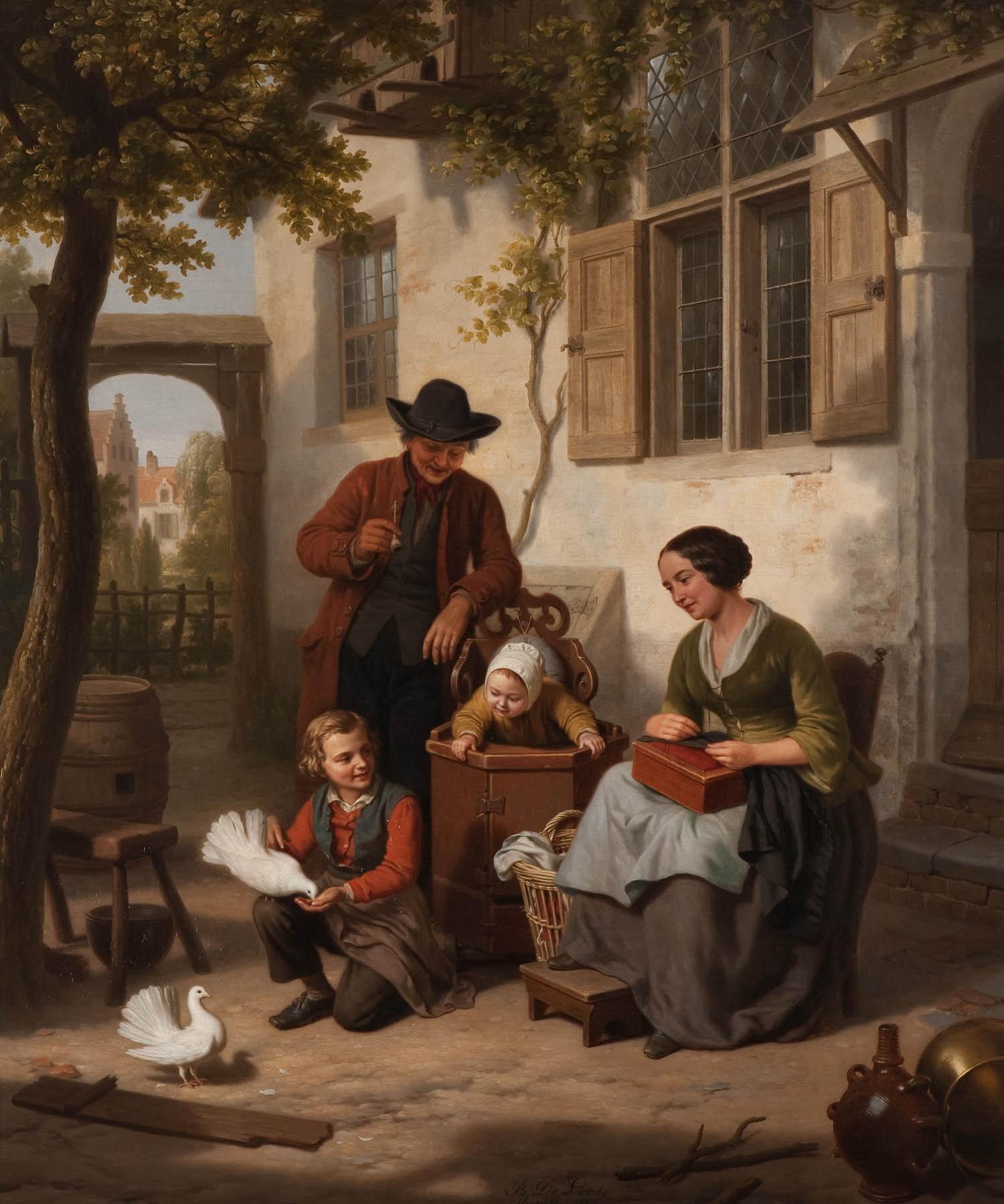
The Happy Family, oil on canvas, 1856

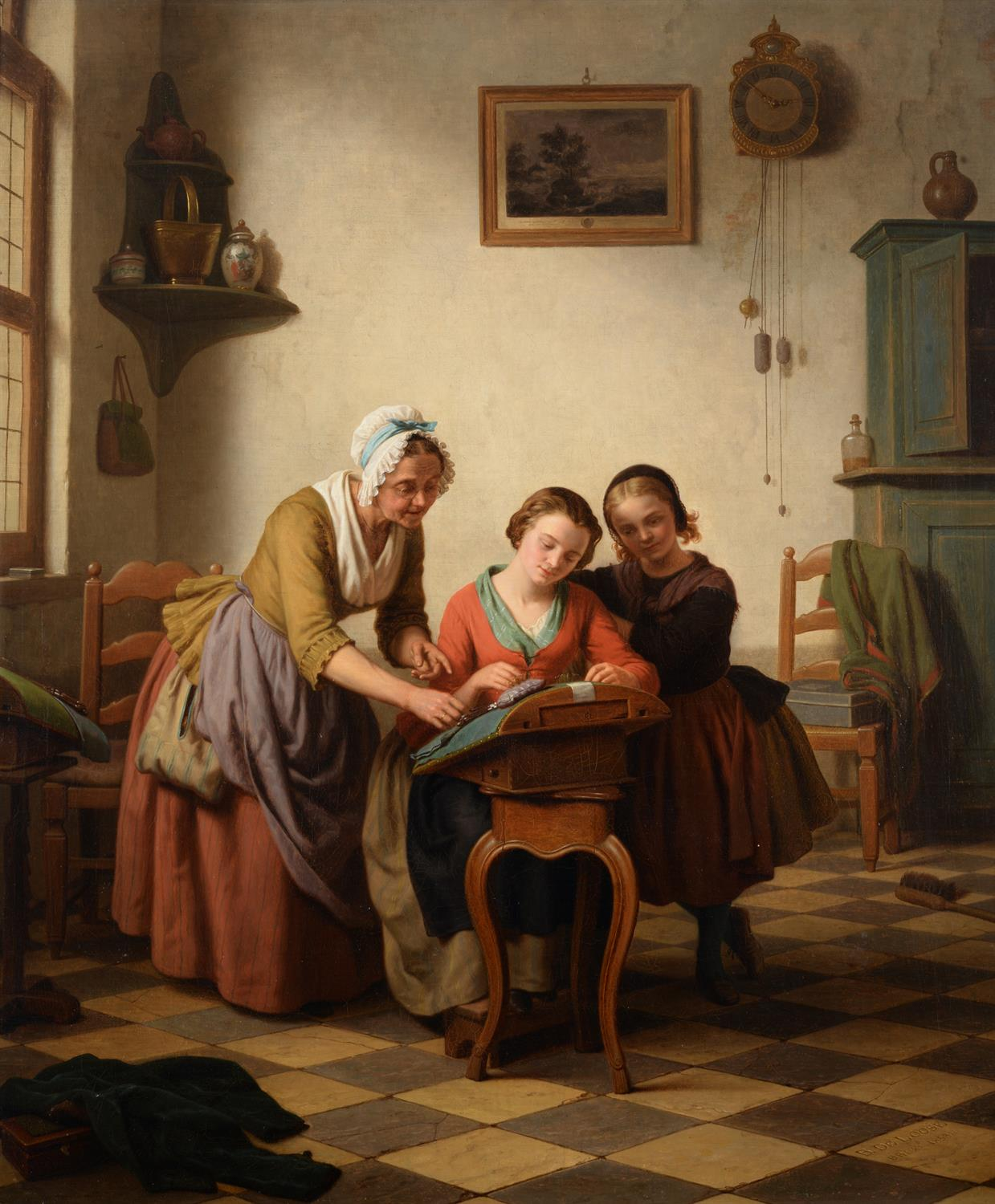
The Sewing Lesson, oil on canvas, 1858

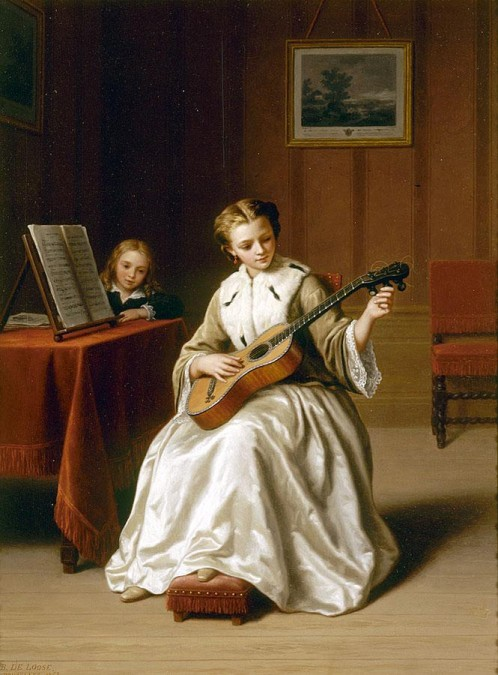
Tuning the Guitar, oil on panel, 1863

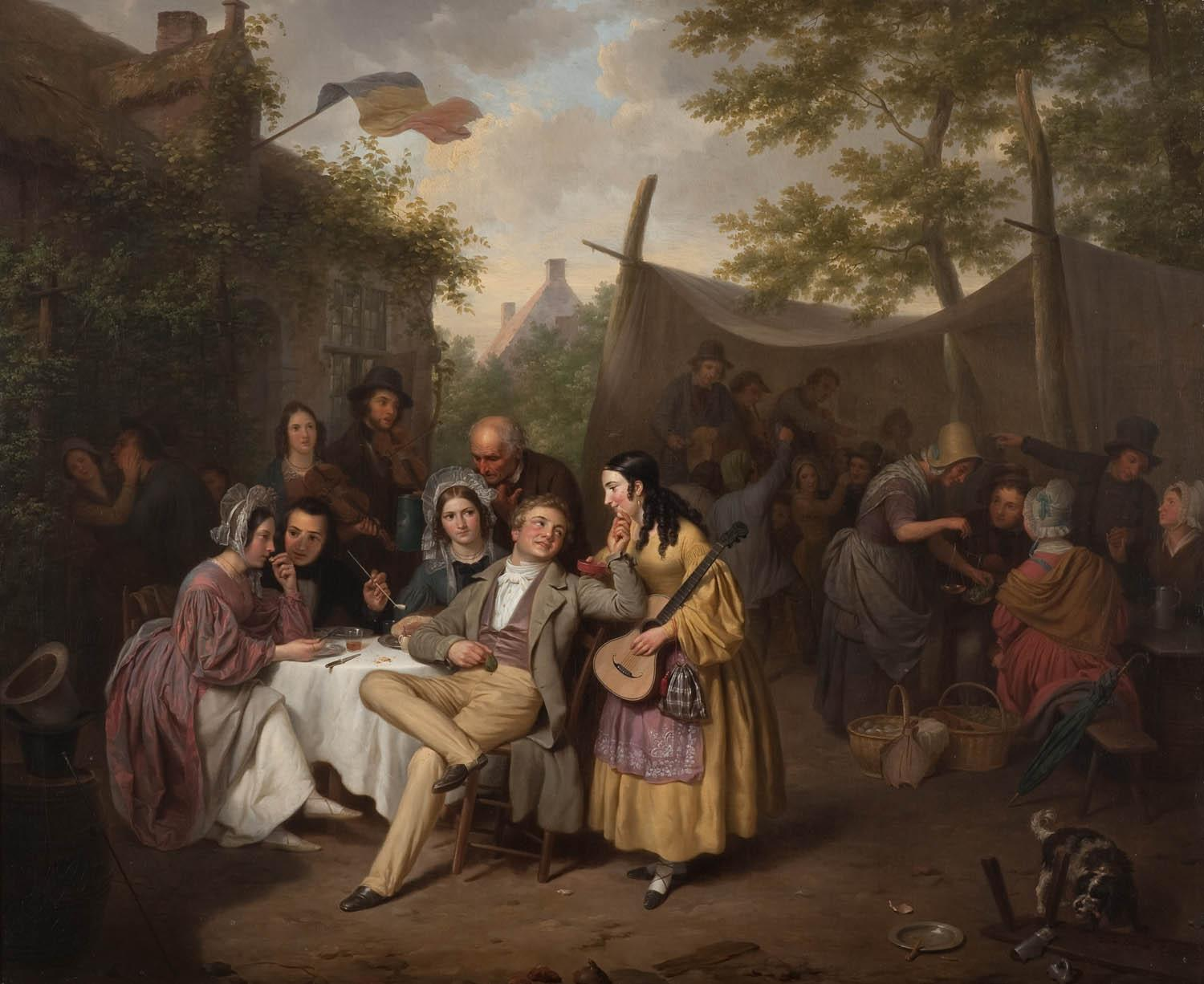
Village Fair, oil on canvas, 1838
