= Christianity in Hebei =

Christianity is a minority religion in the Hebei province of China. According to Asia Harvest, estimates from 2020 suggest that of the entire population (77,188,054) about 5.66% is Christian (4,367,917), among which Catholics accounted for 55.25% (2,413,541).

== Overview ==
The Shouters are present in the province. China has persecution of Christians. A significant minority of the Catholics of China is in Hebei. Bishop Leon Yao Liang was from Hebei. Joseph Guo Jincai has been made a bishop of Chengde in Hebei without consent of the pope. Underground Bishop Julius Jia Zhiguo was arrested in 2008. Bishops James Su Zhi-min and Cosmas Shi Enxiang from Hebei have been sent to prison by 2010. Beifang Jinde is a charitable Catholic institution in Shijiazhuang.

== Roman Catholic dioceses with seat in Hebei ==
- Roman Catholic Diocese of Anguo
- Roman Catholic Diocese of Baoding
- Roman Catholic Diocese of Chengde
- Roman Catholic Diocese of Daming
- Roman Catholic Diocese of Jingxian
- Roman Catholic Diocese of Xianxian
- Roman Catholic Diocese of Xuanhua
- Roman Catholic Diocese of Yongnian
- Roman Catholic Diocese of Zhaoxian
- Roman Catholic Diocese of Zhengding

== See also ==
- Mentuhui
- Spirit Church
- Christianity in Hebei's neighbouring provinces
  - Christianity in Henan
  - Christianity in Inner Mongolia
  - Christianity in Liaoning
  - Christianity in Shandong
