= John William Comber =

The Most Reverend John W. Comber, M.M.
- Superior General of the Catholic Foreign Mission Society of America
- Church: Catholic Church
- See: Titular See of Foratiana
- Appointed: January 23, 1959
- In office: April 9, 1959 - January 12, 1976

Orders
- Ordination: February 1, 1931
- Consecration: April 9, 1959 by Francis Spellman

Personal details
- Born: March 12, 1906 Lawrence, Massachusetts
- Died: March 27, 1998 (aged 92) Ossining, New York

John William Comber, M.M. (March 12, 1906 – March 27, 1998) was an American Catholic missionary who served as the superior general of the Maryknoll Society in the United States from 1956 to 1966. He was named the titular bishop of Foratiana in 1959

== Biography ==
=== Early life and education ===
John Comber was born on March 12, 1906, in Lawrence, Massachusetts, to Thomas F. and Nora (Higgins) Comber. He had three sisters, two of whom became nuns, and five brothers. He was educated at St. Mary’s Grade School in Lawrence and St. John’s Preparatory School in Danvers, Massachusetts.

After graduating from high school, Comber in 1923 entered Boston College in Boston, Massachusetts. He left college in 1925 to study for the priesthood at Maryknoll Seminary in Ossining, New York. Comber earned a Bachelor of Sacred Theology degree in 1930 at the Catholic University of America in Washington, D.C.

=== Priesthood ===
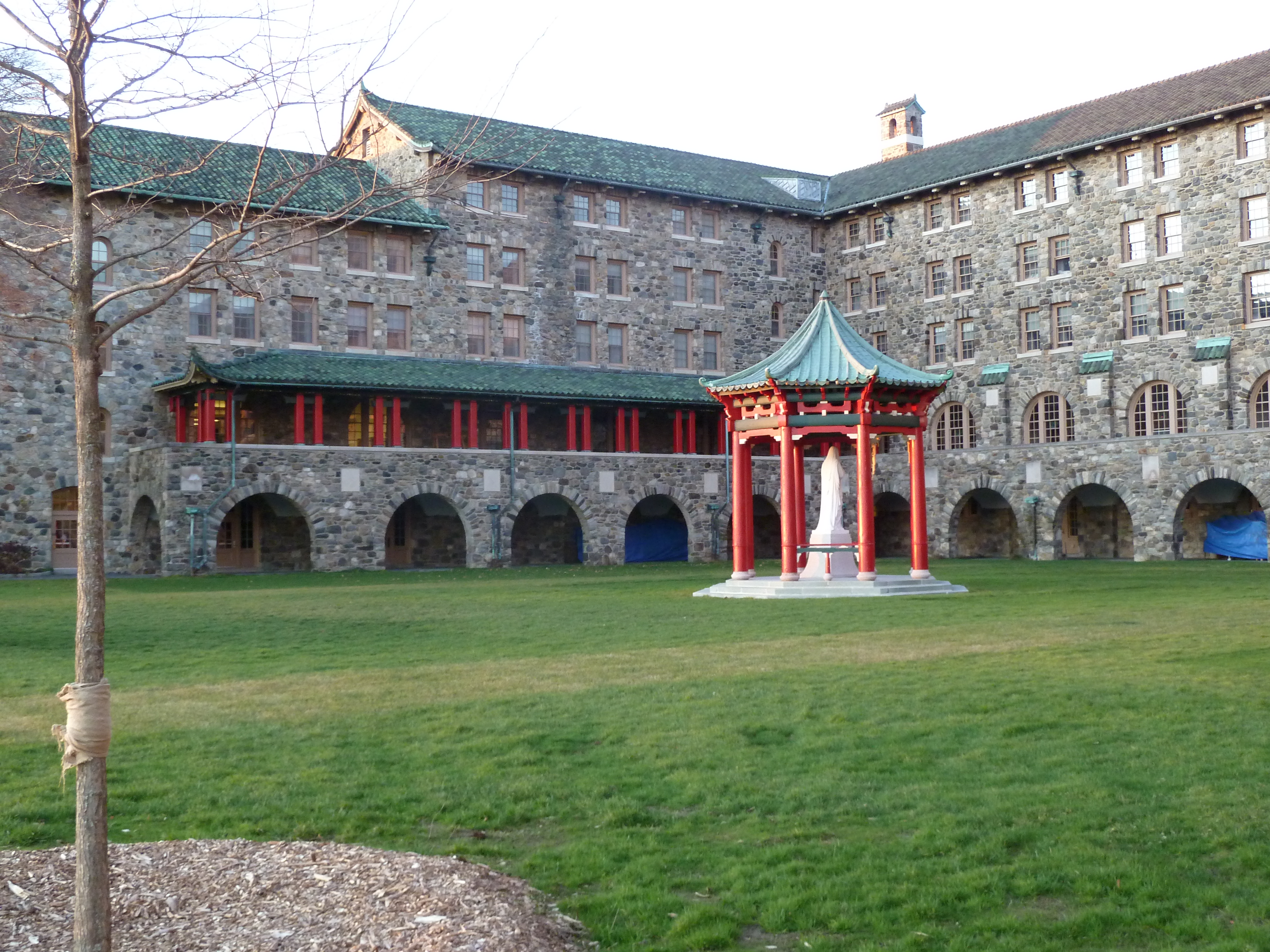
Maryknoll Seminary, Ossining, New York

Comber was ordained a priest for the Maryknoll Society on February 1, 1931.

After his 1931 ordination, the Society sent Comber to China to serve as a missionary at their mission in Fushun, Manchuria. He initially served as pastor of the Er-Pa-Tan mission, then was transferred in 1933 to be pastor of the Tonghua mission

During his 11 years in Manchuria, he learned to speak and write Mandarin fluently. At one point, Comber was kidnapped by bandits, but was able to escape them. After the Japanese attack on Pearl Harbor in 1941, Comber was interned in Manchukuo by the Japanese occupation forces. He was repatriated to the United States in December 1943.

In January 1944, Comber returned to Maryknoll Seminary to teach Mission Sociology; in June 1944, the Society named him as rector of the seminary. During his time as rector, 416 seminarian were ordained priests.

In 1953, the Society assigned Comber to a mission in Peru, where he learned Spanish. He was appointed group superior in 1954 for the new Maryknoll Mission in Chile.

Comber was chosen as a delegate to the Fourth General Chapter of Maryknoll. On August 6, 1956, he was elected as the fourth superior general of the Society. During his ten years in office, Maryknoll experienced a period of rapid growth. They realized their largest number of members and mission commitments.

=== Titular Bishop of Foratiana ===
Pope John XXIII appointed Comber as the titular bishop of Foratiana on January 23, 1959.He was consecrated on April 9, 1959, in Queen of Apostles Chapel at Maryknoll Seminary by Cardinal Francis Spellman,. The principal co-consecrators were Bishops Raymond Lane and Martin McNamara.

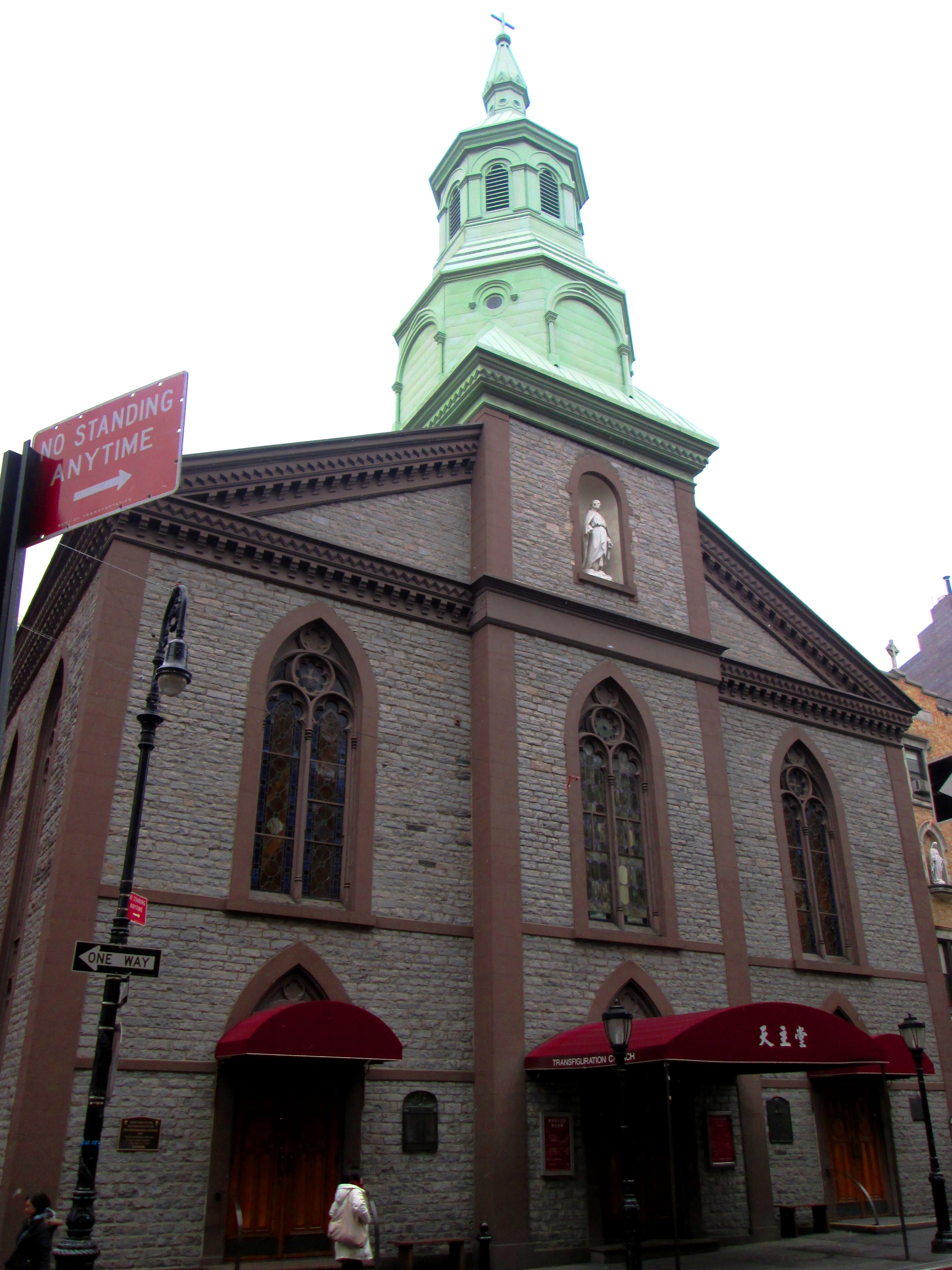
Church of the Transfiguration, Manhattan

Comber attended all four sessions of the Second Vatican Council in Rome from 1962 to 1965. After the Council, the Vatican appointed him to the Post-Conciliar Commission on Missions. In 1966, Comber completed his term as superior general. Spellman appointed him as pastor of the Transfiguration Parish, a parish in Chinatown in Lower Manhattan in 1967.

Comber retired as pastor of Transfiguration in 1969 and moved to the Maryknoll Development House in Manhattan. Later that year, he relocated to the rectory at St. Agnes Parish in Midtown Manhattan.

=== Later life and death ===
As his health declined, Comber moved to the St. Teresa Residence in Ossining, where he remained until his death. He died on March 27, 1998, at the age of 92. His funeral mass was celebrated in the Queen of Apostles Chapel on April 1, 1998, by Auxiliary Bishop Patrick Sheridan. Comber was buried in the Maryknoll Center Cemetery in Ossining.

== Awards ==
- Doctor of Humane Letters of Boston College (1966)
- Knight of the Grand Cross of the Equestrian Order of the Holy Sepulcher in Jerusalem
