= Désiré Piryns =

Belgian painter

- Born: 1889; Zele, Belgium
- Died: 23 April 1948 (aged 58–59); Anderlecht, Belgium
- Occupation: Painter

Désiré Piryns (1889, Zele – 23 April 1948, Anderlecht) was a Belgian painter. His work was part of the painting event in the art competition at the 1936 Summer Olympics.
