= Diocese of Yingkou =

Roman Catholic diocese in China

Coordinates: 40.6667°N 122.2330°E

Diocese of Yingkou Dioecesis Imcheuvensis 天主教营口教区

Location
- Country: China
- Ecclesiastical province: Shenyang
- Metropolitan: Shenyang

Information
- Rite: Latin Rite

Current leadership
- Pope: Leo XIV
- Bishop: Sede Vacante
- Metropolitan Archbishop: Paul Pei Junmin

The Roman Catholic Diocese of Yingkou/Yingkow (Latin: Imcheuven(sis), Chinese: 營口) is a diocese located in the city of Yingkou (Liaoning) in the ecclesiastical province of Shenyang 瀋陽 in China.

== History ==
- July 14, 1949: Established as Diocese of Yingkou 營口 from Metropolitan Archdiocese of Shenyang 瀋陽

== Leadership ==
- Bishops of Yingkou (Roman rite)
  - Bishop André-Jean Vérineux, M.E.P. (費聲遠) (July 14, 1949 – January 10, 1983)
