= Raymond Aloysius Lane =

American Catholic bishop (1894–1974)

The Most Reverend Raymond Aloysius Lane MM
- Bishop of Fushun
- In office: 1946

Orders
- Ordination: February 8, 1920
- Consecration: June 11, 1940

Personal details
- Born: January 2, 1894 Lawrence, Massachusetts, United States
- Died: July 31, 1974 (aged 80) Mountain View, California, United States
- Denomination: Roman Catholic
- Coat of arms

Raymond Aloysius Lane, M.M. (January 2, 1894—July 31, 1974) was an American Roman Catholic missionary. He served as Bishop of Fushun (1946) and Superior General of Maryknoll Fathers (1946-1956).

== Biography ==
Raymond Lane was born in Lawrence, Massachusetts, to Michael and Anastasia (née Doyle) Lane. After graduating from St. John's Preparatory School in Danvers, he declined a chance to enter West Point and turned away from business (with the Rexall drug chain) to become a priest. He then entered Maryknoll Preparatory Seminary in Scranton, Pennsylvania, making his profession in 1913. He was later ordained to the priesthood on February 8, 1920.

Lane served as general procurator of the Maryknoll Fathers for some years before being assigned to Hong Kong in 1923. From 1925 to 1929, he was the first superior of the Maryknoll mission in Manchuria. He served as rector of the Maryknoll Seminary in New York (1929-1932) before returning to China as Prefect Apostolic of Fushun on April 14, 1932. On February 13, 1940, Lane was appointed Vicar Apostolic of Fushun and Titular Bishop of Hypaepa by Pope Pius XII. He received his episcopal consecration on the following June 11 from Bishop James Edward Walsh, M.M., with Bishops Joseph Edward McCarthy and Richard Cushing serving as co-consecrators. After Pearl Harbor attack in 1941, he was interned by the Japanese authorities in Fushun.

When his vicariate was elevated to the rank of a diocese, Lane was named the first Bishop of Fushun on April 11, 1946. Shortly afterwards, he was elected Superior General of the Maryknoll Fathers on August 7 of that year. His tenure led to the greatest expansion at home and abroad for Maryknoll. In 1953 he earned the peace award from the Catholic Association for International Peace. After ten years as superior general, he resigned on August 6, 1956.

Lane later died at St. Mary's Hospital in San Francisco, California, aged 80.

Catholic Church titles
Preceded by none	Bishop of Fushun; 1946	Succeeded by vacant
Preceded by James Edward Walsh	Superior General of Maryknoll Fathers; 1946—1956	Succeeded by John William Comber
