= Zele =

- Municipality
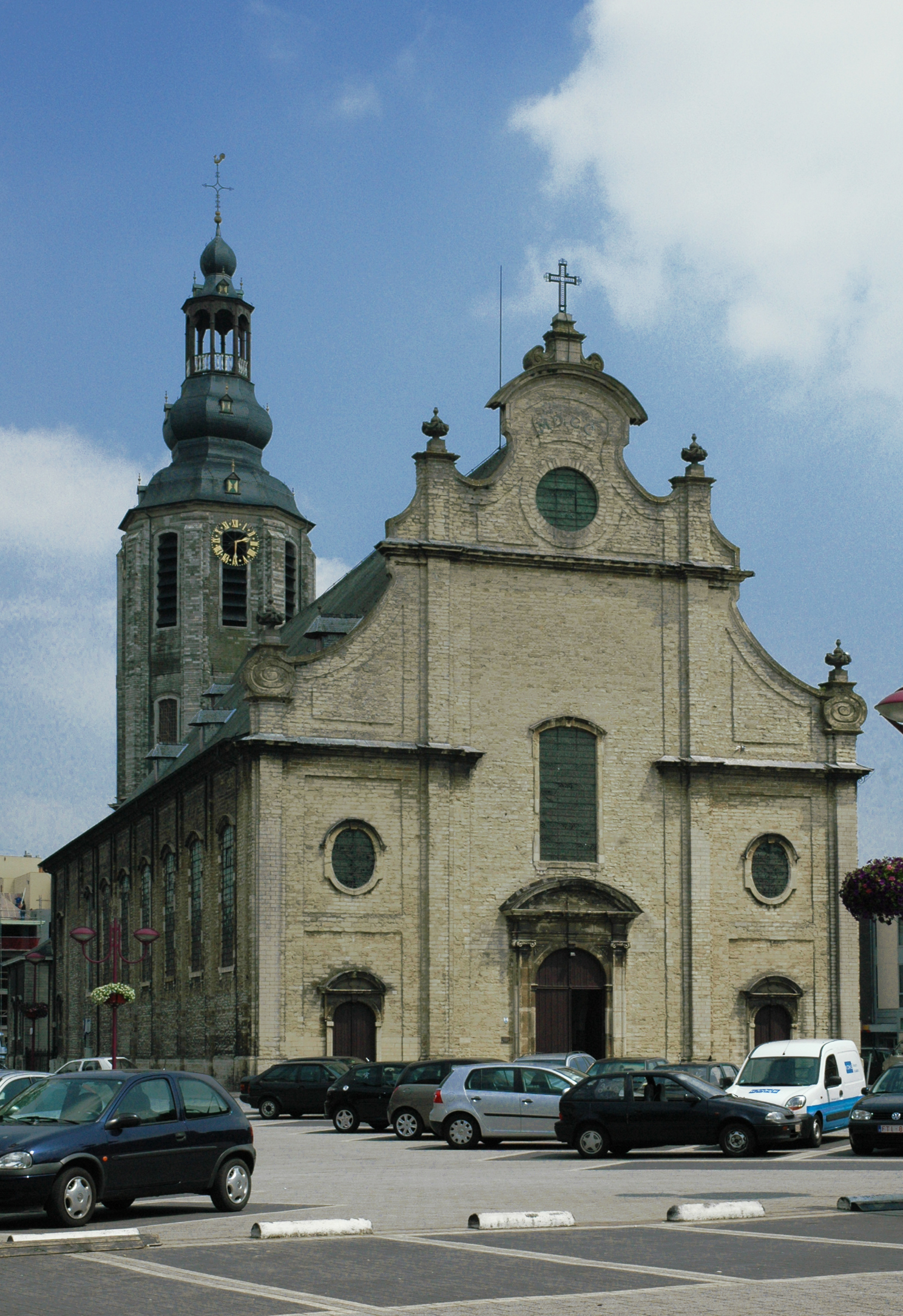
- Sint-Ludgerus church

- Flag Coat of arms

- Location of Zele in East Flanders
- Interactive map of Zele
- Location in Belgium
- Coordinates: 51°04′N 04°02′E
- Country: Belgium
- Community: Flemish Community
- Region: Flemish Region
- Province: East Flanders
- Arrondissement: Dendermonde

Government
  - Mayor: Hans Knop (CD&V)
  - Governing parties: CD&V, Leefbaarder Zele

Area
  - Total: 33.28 km^{2} (12.85 sq mi)

Population (2018-01-01)
  - Total: 20,976
  - Density: 630.3/km^{2} (1,632/sq mi)
- Postal codes: 9240
- NIS code: 42028
- Area codes: 052
- Website: www.zele.be

Zele (Dutch pronunciation: [ˈzeːlə]) is a municipality located in the Belgian province of East Flanders, around 20 kilometers east of Ghent. The municipality only comprises the town of Zele proper. In 2023, Zele had a total population of 21,374. The total area is 33 km^{2} which gives a population density of 641.6 people per km^{2}.

== Toponym ==
The name of the municipality is derived from the Old Dutch or Old Saxon word "seli", which means "(main) building" or "settlement". Examples in the region with that toponym are Brussels, Herzele and Belsele.

== Notable inhabitants ==
- Hans Christiaens, footballer (b. 1964)
- Aloïs de Beule, sculptor (1861–1935)
- Pierre de Decker, former Prime Minister of Belgium (1855–1857) (1812–1891)
- Andreas De Leenheer, academic and biologist (1941-2022)
- Basile De Loose, painter (1809–1885)
- Filip De Wilde, professional football player (b. 1964)
- Michel D'Hooghe, racing cyclist (1912-1940)
- Dirk Heirweg, racing cyclist (b. 1955)
- Christophe Impens, Belgian record holder 1500 m run, semi-finalist at Atlanta Olympics (b. 1969)
- Caroline Maes, professional tennis player (b. 1982)
- Lieven Maesschalck, physiotherapist (b. 1964)
- Joseph Julian Oste, priest, missionary, and Bishop (1893-1971)
- Désiré Piryns, painter (1889-1948)
- William Tackaert, racing cyclist (b. 1956)
- Vanessa Van Cartier, drag queen (b. 1979)
- Miranda Van Eetvelde, politician (b. 1959)
- Sven Verdonck, darts player (b. 1963)
- Frederik De Waele, gymnast (1919-2001)
