= Diocese of Jehol =

Roman Catholic diocese in China

Diocese of Jehol Dioecesis Geholensis 天主教热河教区

Location
- Country: China
- Ecclesiastical province: Shenyang
- Metropolitan: Shenyang

Statistics
- Population: Total; Catholics: (as of 1950); 5,235,341; 31,845 (0.6%)

Information
- Rite: Latin Rite

Current leadership
- Pope: Leo XIV
- Bishop: Sede Vacante
- Metropolitan Archbishop: Paul Pei Junmin

Diocese of Jehol
- Simplified Chinese: 天主教热河教区
Transcriptions
Standard Mandarin
- Hanyu Pinyin: Tiānzhǔjiào Rèhé Jiàoqū
- Wade–Giles: T'ien-chu-chiao Jê-ho Chiao-ch'ü
Yue: Cantonese
- Jyutping: Tin^{1} zyu^{2} gaau^{3} Jit^{6} ho^{4} Gaau^{3} keoi^{1}

Alternative Chinese name
- Traditional Chinese: 熱河
- Simplified Chinese: 热河
Transcriptions
Standard Mandarin
- Hanyu Pinyin: Rèhé
- Wade–Giles: Jê-ho

Second alternative Chinese name
- Traditional Chinese: 晉州
- Simplified Chinese: 晋州
Transcriptions
Standard Mandarin
- Hanyu Pinyin: Jìnzhōu
- Wade–Giles: Chin-chou

The Roman Catholic Diocese of Jehol (Latin: dioecesis Geholensis), also known in Chinese as Rehe or Jinzhou, is a diocese in the ecclesiastical province of Shenyang in China, covering part of the former Rehe Province. Both Jehol and Rehe are forms of the former Chinese name of the city of Chengde; Jinzhou refers to the State of Jin that formerly occupied part of the diocese.

The diocese lost an important part of its territory in 2018, when the entire city of Chengde was taken out to form the Diocese of Chengde, a suffragan of the Archdiocese of Beijing. Now, only the Liaoning part of the diocese remains, along with a very small part of Hebei.

== History ==
- December 21, 1883: Established as Apostolic Vicariate of Eastern Mongolia 東蒙古 from the Apostolic Vicariate of Mongolia 蒙古
- December 3, 1924: Renamed as Apostolic Vicariate of Jehol 熱河
- April 11, 1946: Promoted as Diocese of Jehol 熱河

== Leadership ==
- Bishops of Jehol 熱河 (Roman rite)
  - Bishop Joseph Julian Oste, C.I.C.M. (April 9, 1948 – January 19, 1971)
  - Bishop Louis Janssens, C.I.C.M. (April 11, 1946 – January 9, 1948)
- Vicars Apostolic of Jehol 熱河 (Roman rite)
  - Bishop Louis Janssens, C.I.C.M. (February 4, 1942 – April 11, 1946)
  - Bishop Conrad Abels, C.I.C.M. (July 5, 1897 – 1942)
- Vicars Apostolic of Eastern Mongolia 東蒙古
  - Bishop Théodore-Herman Rutjes, C.I.C.M. (December 11, 1883 – August 4, 1896 [died])
