= Joseph Chang Yanfeng =

Chinese Roman Catholic bishop (born 1984)

His Excellency, The Most Reverend Joseph Chang Yanfeng
- Bishop of Chifeng
- Native name: 常彥峰
- Church: Catholic Church
- Diocese: Chifeng
- Appointed: 15 June 2026
- Predecessor: Vacant
- Previous post: Administrator of Chifeng (2021–2026)

Orders
- Ordination: 18 November 2010
- Consecration: 22 July 2026 by Paul Meng Qinglu

Personal details
- Born: 4 April 1984 (age 42) Beizhen, Liaoning, China (Note: According to the Chinese Catholic Patriotic Association, Joseph Chang Yanfeng was born in Weichang, Hebei.)

Joseph Chang Yanfeng (simplified Chinese: 常彦峰; traditional Chinese: 常彥峰; pinyin: Cháng Yànfēng; born 4 April 1984) is a Chinese Roman Catholic prelate who has served as Bishop of Chifeng since 2026.

He was appointed bishop by Pope Leo XIV on 15 June 2026 within the framework of the Provisional Agreement between the Holy See and the People's Republic of China, and received episcopal consecration on 22 July 2026.

== Early life and priesthood ==
Chang was born on 4 April 1984 in Beizhen, Liaoning, China. He studied philosophy and theology at the National Seminary in Shenyang from 2002 to 2006 and later, from 2007 to 2010 he studied at Daejeon Catholic University, South Korea, where he earned a degree in Biblical Theology and was ordained to the priesthood on 18 November 2010 for the Diocese of Chifeng.

Following his ordination, he served in pastoral ministry in Chifeng. From 2013 to 2019 he was parish priest of the Cathedral of the Sacred Heart. In 2016 he was appointed diocesan chancellor. Since 2021 he had served as diocesan administrator during the prolonged vacancy of the see.

== Episcopate ==
On 15 June 2026, Pope Leo XIV appointed Chang as Bishop of Chifeng. The appointment was announced by the Holy See on 22 July 2026, the day of his episcopal ordination, stating that it had been made within the framework of the Provisional Agreement between the Holy See and the People's Republic of China.

Chang received episcopal consecration on 22 July 2026. The principal consecrator was Bishop Paul Meng Qinglu, assisted by Bishops Anthony Yao Shun and Joseph Pei Junmin

His appointment filled a diocesan vacancy that had lasted several years and represented one of the episcopal appointments made under the Holy See–China agreement during the pontificate of Pope Leo XIV.
