= Diocese of Jilin =

Roman Catholic diocese in China

Diocese of Jilin Dioecesis Chilinensis 天主教吉林教区

Location
- Country: China
- Ecclesiastical province: Shenyang
- Metropolitan: Shenyang

Statistics
- Area: 163,000 km^{2} (63,000 sq mi)
- Population: Total; Catholics: (as of 1949); 9,000,000; 35,000 (0.4%)

Information
- Rite: Latin Rite
- Cathedral: Cathedral of the Sacred Heart of Jesus in Jilin City, Jilin
- Patron saint: Our Lady of Lourdes; Saint Peter; Holy Guardian Angels

Current leadership
- Pope: Leo XIV
- Bishop: Sede Vacante
- Metropolitan Archbishop: Paul Pei Junmin

Map
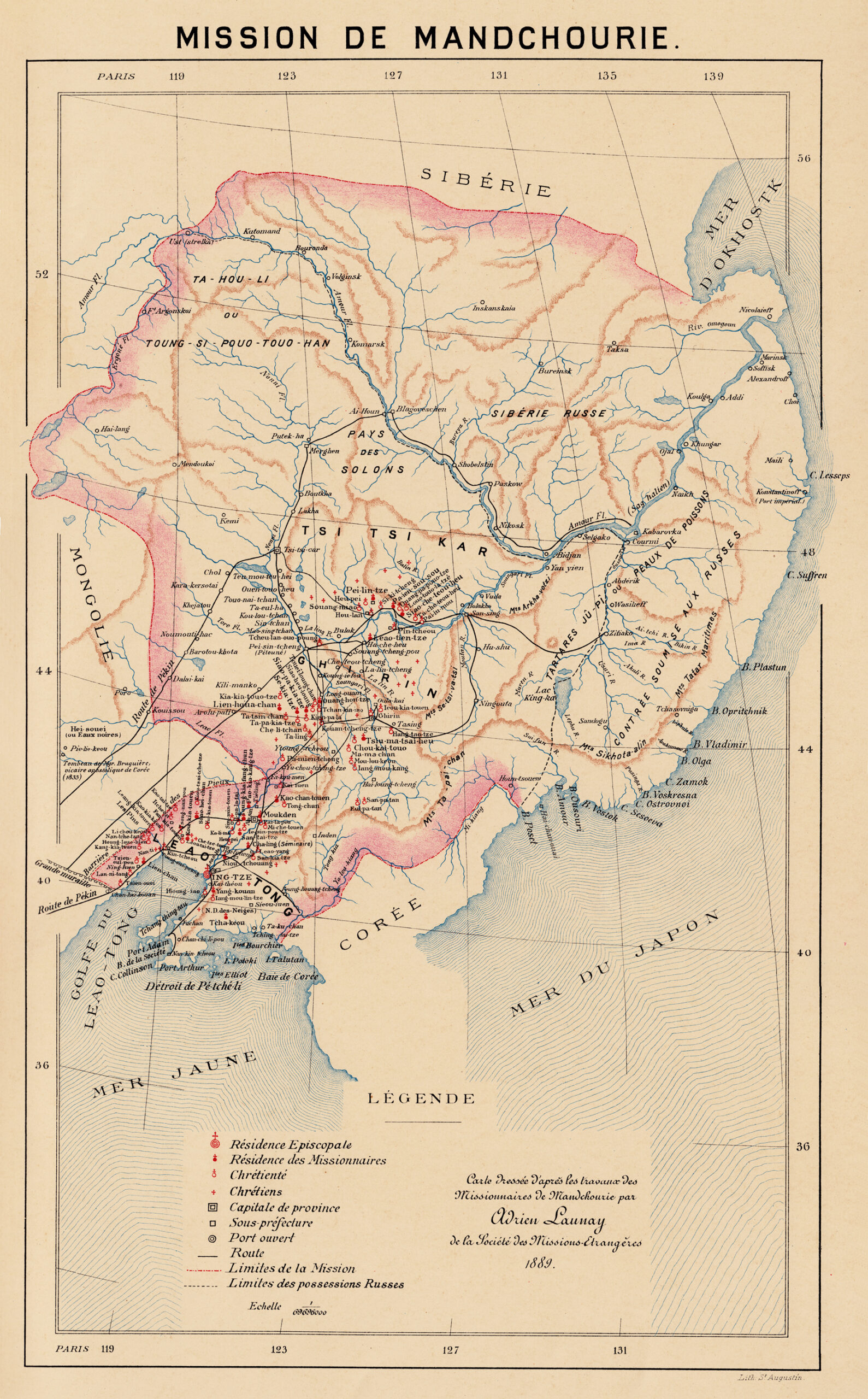
- Map of Manchurian Mission, prepared by Adrien Launay, 1889.

The Roman Catholic Diocese of Jilin/Kírín (Latin: Chilinen(sis), Chinese: 吉林) is a Latin diocese in Manchuria, northeast China.

It is a suffragan in the ecclesiastical province of the Metropolitan of Shenyang 瀋陽, yet depends on the missionary Roman Congregation for the Evangelization of Peoples.

It is vacant (again) since 2009.

Its cathedral episcopal see is the Cathedral of St. Theresa, in Changchun 长春, while the former cathedral is now the Church of the Sacred Heart of Jesus, in Jilin City.

== History ==
Established on May 10, 1898 as Apostolic Vicariate of Northern Manchuria 北滿, on territory split off from the Apostolic Vicariate of Liaotung and Manuchria 遼東滿州

Renamed on December 3, 1924 as Apostolic Vicariate of Jilin 吉林 after its see

On 1928.07.09, it lost territory to establish the then Mission sui juris of Qiqihar 齊齊哈爾 (now an Apostolic prefecture)

Promoted on April 11, 1946 as Diocese of Jilin 吉林

Vacant from 1952 to 1999 and again since 2009?

From 1959 to 1994, the hostile PRC established a rival national church lie of pretenders without papal mandate, now also vacant.

== Episcopal ordinaries ==
(all Roman Rite)

Apostolic Vicars of Northern Manchuria 北滿

- Pierre-Marie-François Lalouyer, Paris Foreign Missions Society (M.E.P.) (May 16, 1898 – death February 17, 1923), Titular Bishop of Raphaneæ (1897.07.24 – 1923.02.17), previously Coadjutor Apostolic Vicar of Southern Manchuria 南滿 (China) (1897.07.24 – 1898.05.16)
- Auguste-Ernest-Désiré-Marie Gaspais, M.E.P. (高德惠) (February 17, 1923 – December 3, 1924), Titular Bishop of Canopus (1920.12.16 – 1946.04.11 see below), succeeding as former Coadjutor Vicar Apostolic of Northern Manchuria (1920.12.20 – 1923.02.17)

Apostolic Vicar of Jilin 吉林

- Bishop Auguste-Ernest-Désiré-Marie Gaspais, M.E.P. (高德惠) (see above December 3, 1924 – April 11, 1946 see below)
  - Coadjutor Vicar Apostolic: Charles-Joseph Lemaire (惠化民), M.E.P. (1939.07.11 – 1945.11.16), Titular Bishop of Otrus (1939.07.11 – death 1995.04.22), no previous office

Suffragan Bishops of Jilin 吉林

- Auguste-Ernest-Désiré-Marie Gaspais, M.E.P. (高德惠) (see above April 11, 1946 – death October 21, 1952)
- uncanonical Wang Wei-min (王維民) (1959 – 1981) (consecrated Bishop 1959.05.31 without papal mandate)
- uncanonical Roch Liu Dian-xi (劉殿墀) (1982 – death 1985.04.04) (consecrated Bishop 1982.10.10 without papal mandate)
- uncanonical John Li Xue-song (李雪松) (1985 – 1994.05.20) (consecrated Bishop 1985.09.22 without papal mandate)
- Damasus Zhang Han-min (張翰民) (1999 – death 2009.07.19)
- vacancy

== See also ==
- Christianity in Jilin

== External links and sources ==
- GCatholic.org, with incumbent biography links, Google map and satellite photo
- Catholic Hierarchy
