= Diocese of Fushun =

Roman Catholic diocese in China

Coordinates: 41.4167°N 123.9000°E

Diocese of Fushun Dioecesis Fuscioenensis 天主教抚顺教区

Location
- Country: China
- Ecclesiastical province: Shenyang
- Metropolitan: Shenyang

Statistics
- Area: 75,204 km^{2} (29,036 sq mi)
- Population: Total; Catholics: (as of 1949); 6,250,000; 10,000 (0.2%)

Information
- Rite: Latin Rite
- Cathedral: Cathedral of St Joseph in Fushun, Liaoning

Current leadership
- Pope: Leo XIV
- Bishop: Sede Vacante
- Metropolitan Archbishop: Paul Pei Junmin

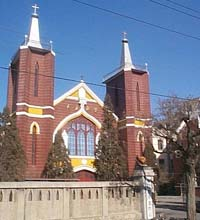
Dalian catholic Church, Dalian, China

The Roman Catholic Diocese of Fushun (Latin: Fuscioenen(sis), Chinese: 撫順) is a suffragan Latin diocese in the ecclesiastical province of the metropolitan of Shenyang 瀋陽 in PR China.

Its cathedral episcopal see is a Cathedral of St. Joseph, located in the city of Fushun.

== History ==
- Established on February 4, 1932 as the Apostolic Prefecture of Fushun 撫順, on territory split off from the Apostolic Vicariate of Shenyang 瀋陽
- Promoted on February 13, 1940 as Apostolic Vicariate of Fushun 撫順
- April 11, 1946: Promoted as Diocese of Fushun 撫順, ending its missionary exempt, pre-diocesan status, yet it still depends on the missionary Roman Congregation for the Evangelization of Peoples.

== Ordinaries ==
(all Roman Rite)

Apostolic Prefect of Fushun 撫順

- Fr. Raymond Aloysius Lane, M.M. (April 14, 1932 – February 13, 1940 see below)

Apostolic Vicar of Fushun 撫順

- Raymond Aloysius Lane, M.M. (see above February 13, 1940 – April 11, 1946 see below), Titular Bishop of Hypæpa (1940.02.13 – 1946.04.11)

Suffragan Bishops of Fushun 撫順

- Raymond Aloysius Lane, M.M. (see above April 11, 1946 – August 7, 1946); later Superior General of Catholic Foreign Mission Society of America (Maryknoll Fathers) (1946.08.07 – retired 1956.08.06)
- Vacant since 7 August 1946, without Apostolic Administrator.

== Sources and external links ==
- GCatholic.org, with titular incumbent biography links
- Catholic Hierarchy
