= Diocese of Chifeng =

Roman Catholic diocese in China

Coordinates: 42.28024°N 118.96511°E

Diocese of Chifeng Dioecesis Cefomensis 天主教赤峰教区

Location
- Country: China
- Ecclesiastical province: Shenyang
- Metropolitan: Shenyang

Statistics
- Area: 75,087 km^{2} (28,991 sq mi)
- Population: Total; Catholics: (as of 1950); 798,000; 29,582 (3.7%)

Information
- Rite: Latin Rite
- Cathedral: Cathedral in Chifeng

Current leadership
- Pope: Leo XIV
- Bishop: Joseph Chang Yanfeng
- Metropolitan Archbishop: Paul Pei Junmin

The Roman Catholic Diocese of Chifeng/Chihfeng (Latin: Cefomen(sis), Chinese: 赤峰) is a diocese located in the city of Chifeng (Inner Mongolia) in the ecclesiastical province of Shenyang in China.

== History ==
- 1922: Established as the Apostolic Prefecture of Chifeng 赤峰 from the Apostolic Vicariate of Eastern Mongolia 東蒙古
- January 21, 1932: Promoted as Apostolic Vicariate of Chifeng 赤峰
- April 21, 1949: Promoted as Diocese of Chifeng 赤峰

== Leadership ==
- Bishops of Chifeng (Roman rite)
  - Fr. Luke Zhao Qing-hua (趙慶化) (January 11, 1932 – 1949)
- Joseph Chang Yanfeng (since June 15, 2026)
