= St. Theresa's Cathedral, Changchun =

Church in Changchun, China

Coordinates: 43°53′27″N 125°20′49″E

St. Theresa's Cathedral of Changchun (in Chinese: 长春圣德肋撒教堂) is a Roman Catholic cathedral in Changchun, Jilin Province, China. It is also called Changchun City Catholic Church or St. Theresa's Diocesan Cathedral (Chinese: 圣德肋撒主教座堂) in Changchun because the bishop of Jilin Diocese moved here in 1994, from Sacred Heart of Jesus Cathedral of Jilin City.

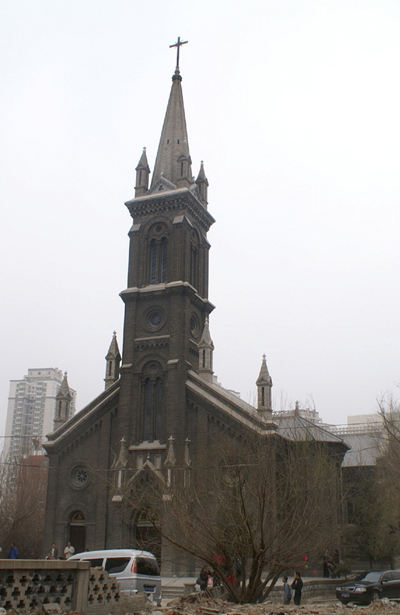
St. Theresa's Cathedral of Changchun (2009)

== History ==
In 1895, French missionaries arrived in the Changchun area, and in 1898, the first Catholic church was built on the site of the present Cathedral. In 1912, a school attached to the church was built, which is now Changchun City's Middle School No. 104. Construction on the present building began in 1930 and was completed two years later. While the architect of the building is unknown, its gothic revival design bears a striking resemblance to the designs of Fr. Henri Lamasse, who built cathedrals at Shenyang and Jilin.

In 1969, all religious activity at the cathedral was stopped as the Cultural Revolution swept through the region. The cathedral was converted into a book depository, and in 1979, the cathedral fell victim to a major fire that left only the west front standing. The damage was later repaired. In 1994, the seat of the Diocese of Jilin was moved to the cathedral, and rebuilding efforts were completed in 2008. Rededication ceremonies were held in December.

== See also ==
- Roman Catholicism in China
- Chinese Patriotic Catholic Association
- List of Catholic cathedrals in China
