= Lieven Maesschalck =

Lieven Maesschalck (2021)

Lieven Maesschalck (born 1964 in Zele) is a Belgian physiotherapist who worked among others with the Belgium national football team. As a physiotherapist he also treats multiple sportsmen.

== Biography ==
In 1987 he took over the private practice of his father in Lebbeke. In 1996 he was hired by the cycling team Mapei. In the same year he went to the Atlanta Summer Olympics with the national judo and swimming federations. In 1998 he opened a second practice in Antwerp.

In 2001 Maesschalck started the concept "Move To Cure" and in the same year he was hired by the national football team of Belgium (the Red Devils). In 2006 also the Italian team AC Milan asked for his services. From 2010 on he became the head of the medical staff of the Belgium national football team. In 2013 Maesschalck received a doctorate honoris causa from Hasselt University.

He treated many top sporters among which racecar drivers, jockeys, cyclists, athletes, football players, tennis players and golfers. These include Luc Van Lierde, Christophe Impens, Johan Museeuw, Justine Henin, Marc Wilmots, Gella Vandecaveye, Nicolas Colsaerts, Xavier Malisse, Yanina Wickmayer and Frank Vandenbroucke.
