= Diocese of Yanji =

Roman Catholic diocese in China

Coordinates: 42.9000°N 129.5000°E

Diocese of Yanji Dioecesis Ienchivensis 天主教延吉教区

Location
- Country: China
- Ecclesiastical province: Shenyang
- Metropolitan: Shenyang

Information
- Rite: Latin Rite
- Cathedral: Cathedral in Yanji

Current leadership
- Pope: Leo XIV
- Bishop: Sede Vacante
- Metropolitan Archbishop: Paul Pei Junmin

The Roman Catholic Diocese of Yanji/Yenki (Latin: Ienchiven(sis), Chinese: 延吉) is a diocese located in the city of Yanji (Jilin) in the ecclesiastical province of Shenyang 瀋陽 in China.

== History ==
- July 19, 1928: Established as the Apostolic Prefecture of Yanji 延吉 from the Apostolic Vicariate of Wonsan
- April 13, 1937: Promoted as Apostolic Vicariate of Yanji 延吉
- April 11, 1946: Promoted as Diocese of Yanji 延吉

== Leadership ==
- Bishops of Yanji 延吉 (Roman rite)
  - Fr. Timotheus Bitterli, O.S.B. (이 디모테오) (Apostolic Administrator April 9, 1954 – October 4, 1985)
  - Bishop Theodor Breher, O.S.B. (April 11, 1946 – November 2, 1950)
- Prefects Apostolic of Yanji 延吉 (Roman Rite)
  - Fr. Theodor Breher, O.S.B. (later Bishop) (February 5, 1929 – April 13, 1937)
