= Diocese of Sipingjie =

Roman Catholic diocese in China

Diocese of Sipingjie Dioecesis Sepimchiaevensis 天主教四平街教区

Location
- Country: China
- Ecclesiastical province: Shenyang
- Metropolitan: Shenyang

Information
- Rite: Latin Rite
- Cathedral: Sacred Heart Cathedral, Jilin

Current leadership
- Pope: Leo XIV
- Metropolitan Archbishop: Paul Pei Junmin

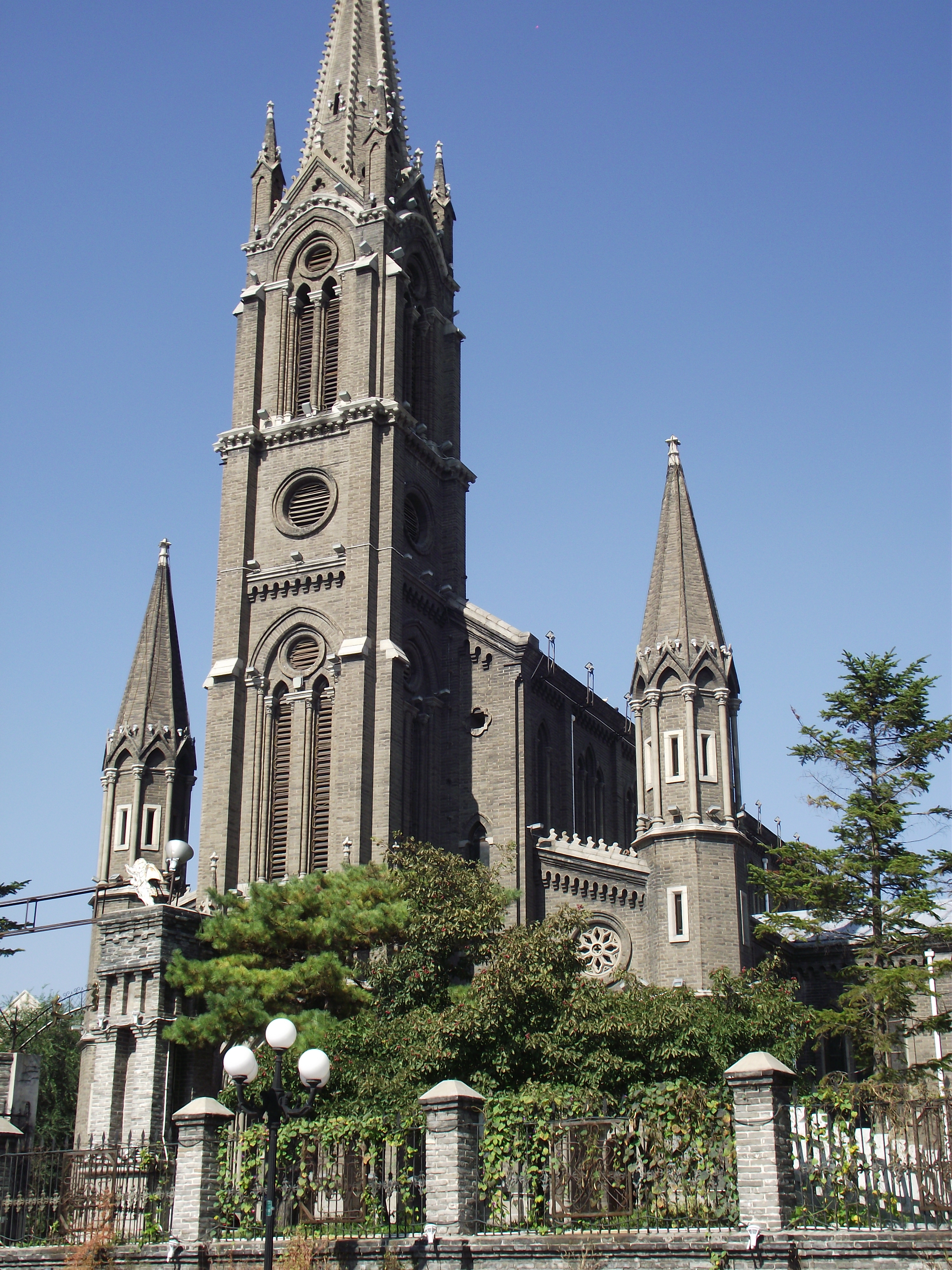
Sacred Heart Cathedral

The Roman Catholic Diocese of Sipingjie/Siping/Szepíngkai (Latin: Sepimchiaeven(sis), Chinese: 四平街 / 四平; pinyin: Sìpíngjiē / Sìpíng) is a Latin suffragan diocese in the ecclesiastical province of the Metropolitan of Shenyang.

Its episcopal seat is at Sacred Heart Cathedral located in the city of Sipingjie (Siping, Jiling or Szepíngkai) in Jilin province.

== History ==
- Established on August 2, 1929 as the Apostolic Prefecture of Szepingkai (四平街), on territories split off from the then Apostolic Vicariate of Shenyang (瀋陽) and the Apostolic Vicariate of Rehe (熱河)
- June 1, 1932: Promoted as Apostolic Vicariate of Szepingkai (四平街)
- Lost territory on 18 May 1937 to establish the Apostolic Prefecture of Lindong (林東)
- April 11, 1946: Promoted and renamed as Diocese of Siping(jie) alias Szepíngkai (四平街), ending its missionary, pre-diocesan and exempt status

== Ordinaries ==
(all Roman rite, mostly missionary members of a Latin congregation)

Apostolic Prefects of Szepingkai

- Fr. Joseph Louis Adhémar Lapierre, Société des Missions-Étrangères du Québec (Society of Foreign Missions; P.M.E.) (February 19, 1930–May 24, 1932 see below)

Apostolic Vicar of Szepingkai

- Joseph Louis Adhémar Lapierre, P.M.E. (see above May 24, 1932–April 11, 1946 see below), Titular Bishop of Cardicium (1932.05.24–1946.04.11)

Suffragan Bishops of Sipingjie

- Joseph Louis Adhémar Lapierre, P.M.E. (see above April 11, 1946–death December 1, 1952)
- Apostolic Administrator (1954.04.02–2004) Paul Zhang
- Andrew Han Jingtao (1982–2020.12.30)

== Sources and external links ==
- GCatholic.org
- Catholic Hierarchy
