= Christianity in Heilongjiang =

Christianity is a minority in Heilongjiang, a province of China. There are millions of Christians, however. It is an area of rapid growth of Christianity. The Shouters are present in the province. Heilongjiang has persecution of Christians. Harbin has Heilongjiang Provincial Protestant Bible School. Churches of Christianity in Harbin include Harbin Nangang Christian Church, Church of the Intercession in Harbin, Sacred Heart Cathedral of Harbin. Heilongjiang used to have more than 100,000 Orthodox Christians. Saint Sophia Cathedral in Harbin is a former Russian Orthodox Church. The current church, Pokrov Church has been reopened in 1984 and has services in Chinese. Huangshan has an orthodox churchyard.

== See also ==
- Christianity in Heilongjiang's neighbouring provinces
  - Christianity in Inner Mongolia
  - Christianity in Jilin
