= Sacred Heart of Jesus Cathedral, Shenyang =

Cathedral of the Sacred Heart of Jesus
- 耶稣圣心大教堂 (Chinese)
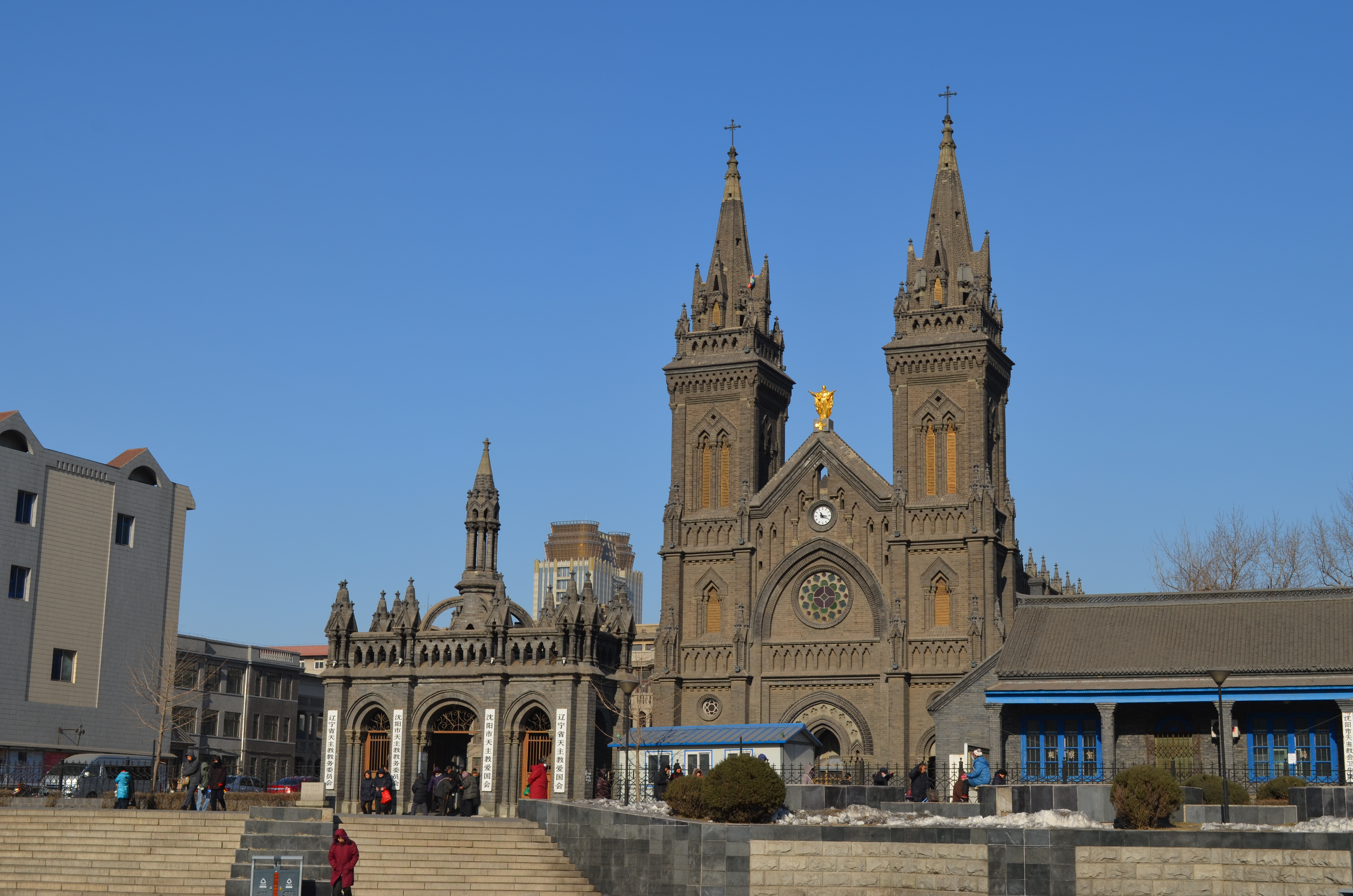
- Sacred Heart Cathedral of Shenyang
- Cathedral of the Sacred Heart of Jesus
- 41.7881°N 123.4464°E
- Location: Nanlejiao Road 40, Shenhe District, Shenyang
- Denomination: Roman Catholic

History
- Status: Cathedral, minor basilica

Architecture
- Functional status: Active
- Architect: Henri Lamasse
- Style: Gothic
- Completed: 1912

Specifications
- Length: 66 metres (217 ft)
- Width: 17 metres (56 ft)
- Height: 40 metres (130 ft)

The Cathedral of the Sacred Heart of Jesus in Shenyang (Chinese: 沈阳耶稣圣心主教座堂) is a Roman Catholic cathedral in Shenyang, Liaoning Province, China. It is the seat of the Diocese of Shenyang. It is commonly called Nanguan Catholic Church (Chinese: 南关天主教堂) and Xiaonan Catholic Church (Chinese: 小南天主教堂). In 2006 the Vatican agreed to Paul Pei (Pei Jun Min) being installed as the Bishop of Shenyang. He was appointed Metropolitan Archbishop in 2008.

== History ==
In June 1858, when the Second Opium War ended, China signed the Treaty of Tientsin with Britain and France respectively, which stipulated that Niu Zhang was to be opened as a trading port and that Christians and Catholics could preach freely and had the right to purchase land for any purpose.

The Good News was brought to the Shenyang area by Jean Chenin (in Chinese: 神南诺望), a French missionary, who came in 1861 by way of Yingkou and rented a private house for the mission.

The current building was designed by Henri Lamasse. Lamasse arrived in China in 1894, founding a mission at Tieling before being forced to flee in the wake of the Boxer Rebellion. He arrived in Shenyang three month after the Boxers had been defeated, and immediately began building the city's cathedral using indemnity money paid by the Qing government to the foreign powers which had defeated the Boxers. It was completed in 1912. Lamasse presided over the building of several other cathedrals and churches, including St. Theresa's Cathedral, Changchun.

== See also ==
- Roman Catholicism in China
- Chinese Patriotic Catholic Association
- List of Catholic cathedrals in China
