= Louis Janssens =

- Bishop of the Roman Catholic Diocese of Jehol
- Province: Roman Catholic Archdiocese of Shenyang
- Diocese: Roman Catholic Diocese of Jehol
- Installed: 4 February 1942
- Term ended: 9 January 1948
- Predecessor: Conrad Abels
- Successor: Joseph Julian Oste

Orders
- Ordination: 14 July 1901

Personal details
- Born: 24 October 1876 Belgium
- Died: 14 April 1950 (aged 73) Antwerp, Flemish Region, Belgium
- Denomination: Roman Catholic

Louis Janssens (Chinese: 南阜民; pinyin: Nán Fùmín; 24 October 1876 – 14 April 1950) was a Belgian Catholic priest, missionary, and Bishop of the Roman Catholic Diocese of Jehol between 1942 and 1948.

== Biography ==
Louis Janssens was born in Belgium, on 24 October 1876. He was ordained a priest on 14 July 1901. He went to Mongolia to preach in October 1903. On 24 February 1939 he became Vicar Apostolic of Jehol. When the People's Liberation Army controlled the area, he took refuge in Beiping. On 9 January 1948 he returned to Belgium after resignation.

On 14 April 1950 he died in Antwerp, Flemish Region, aged 73.

Catholic Church titles
Preceded by Conrad Abels	Bishop of the Roman Catholic Diocese of Jehol; 1942–1948	Succeeded by Joseph Julian Oste
