= Archdiocese of Shenyang =

Catholic archdiocese in China

Coordinates: 41.7883°N 123.4470°E

Archdiocese of Shenyang Archidioecesis Fomtienensis 天主教奉天总教区
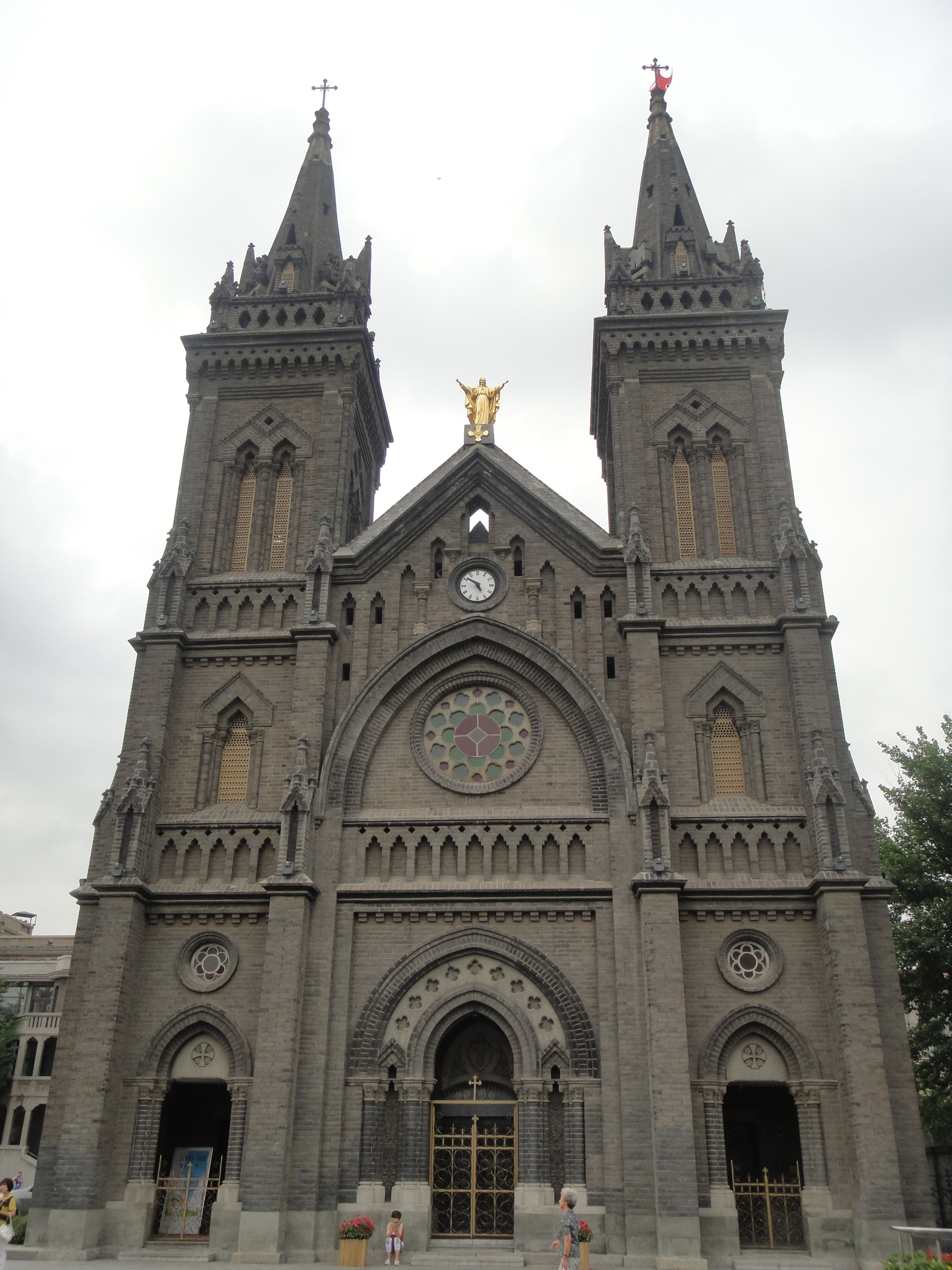
- Sacred Heart Cathedral of Shenyang

Location
- Country: China
- Ecclesiastical province: Shenyang

Statistics
- Population: Total; Catholics: (as of 1950); 5,040,154; 11,767 (0.2%)

Information
- Denomination: Roman Catholic
- Rite: Latin Rite
- Cathedral: Sacred Heart Cathedral of Shenyang

Current leadership
- Pope: Leo XIV
- Metropolitan Archbishop: Paul Pei Junmin

Map
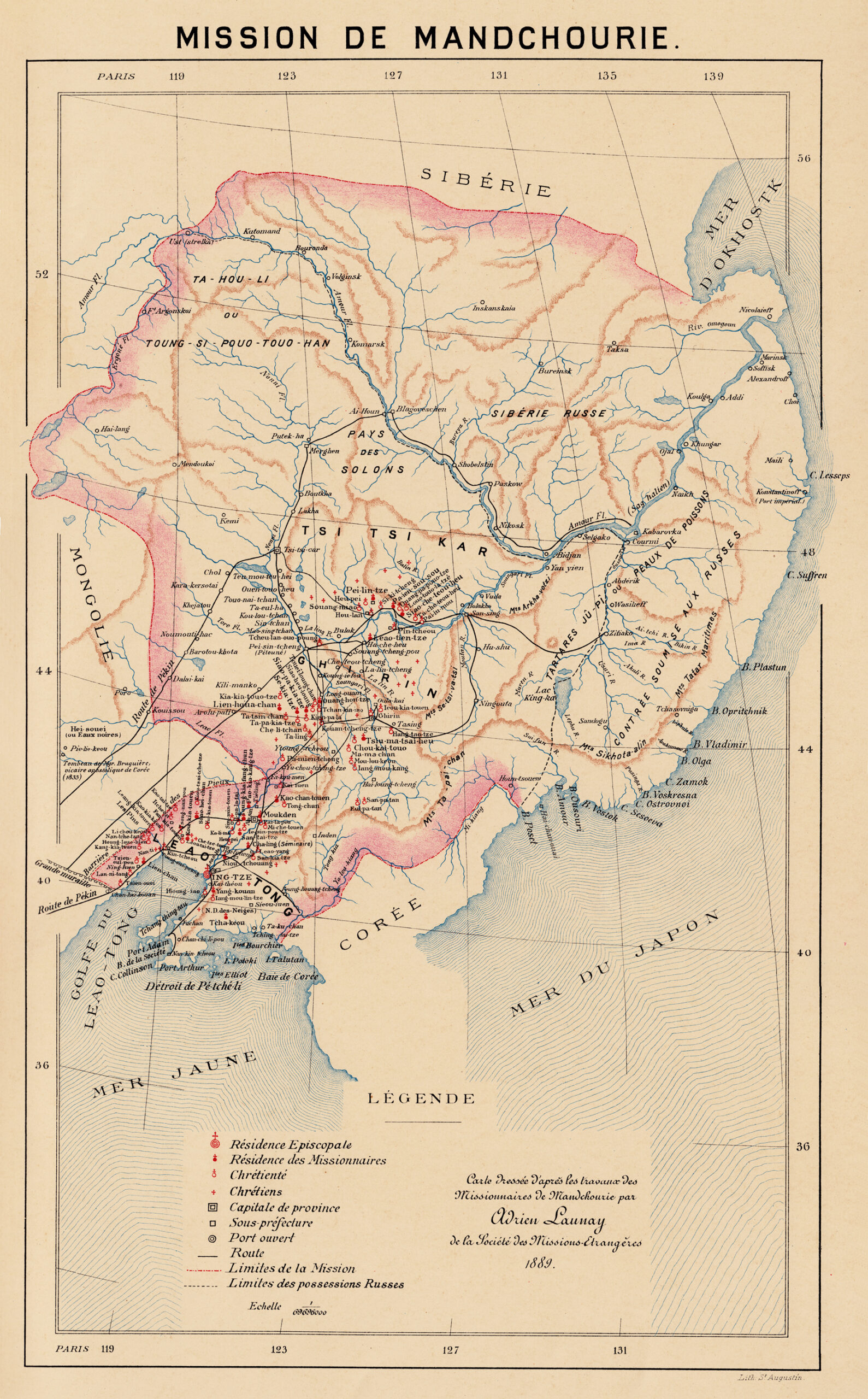
- Map of Manchurian Mission, prepared by Adrien Launay, 1889.

The Archdiocese of Shenyang (Latin: Fomtienen(sis), Chinese: 瀋陽, 奉天) is a Latin Metropolitan archdiocese in northeastern PR China.

Its cathedral episcopal see is a Cathedral of the Sacred Heart of Jesus, in the city of Shenyang, capital of Liaoning Province.

== History ==
- The Apostolic Vicariate of Liaotung 遼東, alias of Manchuria and Mongolia 滿蒙, was established by Pope Gregory XVI in 1838, taking the "vast Tartar province called Leao-Tung" from the existing Roman Catholic Diocese of Beijing 北京.
- August 20, 1840: Renamed as Apostolic Vicariate of (Liaotung and) Manchuria 遼東滿州, having ceded territory to establish the Apostolic Vicariate of Mongolia 蒙古)
- May 10, 1898: Renamed as Apostolic Vicariate of Southern Manchuria 南滿, having ceded territory to establish the Apostolic Vicariate of Northern Manchuria 北滿)
- December 3, 1924: Renamed as Apostolic Vicariate of Shenyang 瀋陽 alias Fengtian 奉天 alias Moukden
- Ceded territory on 1929-08-02 to establish the Apostolic Prefecture of Szepingkai 四平街 and again on 1932-02-04 to establish the Apostolic Prefecture of Fushun 撫順 (now a suffragan)
- Promoted on April 11, 1946 as Metropolitan Archdiocese of Shenyang 瀋陽, ending its missionary, exempt pre-diocesan status
- Ceded territory on 1949-07-14 to establish the Diocese of Yingkou 營口 (as a suffragan)

== Episcopal ordinaries ==
(all Roman Rite)

Apostolic Vicar of Liaotung (Manchuria and Mongolia) 遼東

- Emmanuel-Jean-François Verrolles, Paris Foreign Missions Society (M.E.P.) (方若望) (December 11, 1838 – August 20, 1840 see below), Titular Bishop of Columbica (1838-12-11 – 1878-04-29)

Apostolic of Vicars (Liaotung and) Manchuria 遼東滿州

- Emmanuel-Jean-François Verrolles, M.E.P. (方若望) (see above August 20, 1840 – death April 29, 1878)
- Constant Dubail, M.E.P. (杜公斯) (May 23, 1879 – death December 7, 1887), Titular Bishop of Bolina (1879-05-23 – 1887-12-07)
  - Coadjutor Vicar Apostolic (never succeeded) Joseph-André Boyer (包), M.E.P. (1886-04-13 – death 1887-03-08), Titular Bishop of Myrina (1886-04-13 – 1887-03-08)
- Louis-Hippolyte-Aristide Raguit, M.E.P. (祁類思) (March 23, 1888 – death May 17, 1889), Titular Bishop of Traianopolis (in Phrygia) (1888-03-23 – 1889-05-17)
- Laurent Guillon, M.E.P. (紀隆) (December 28, 1889 – May 10, 1898 see below), Titular Bishop of Eumenia (1889-12-28 – 1900-07-02 see below)
  - Coadjutor Vicar Apostolic (never succeeded) Pierre-Marie-François Lalouyer (藍祿葉), M.E.P. (1897-07-24 – 1898-05-16), Titular Bishop of Raphaneæ (1897-07-24 – death 1923-02-17), later Apostolic Vicar of Northern Manchuria 北滿 (China) (1898-05-16 – 1923-02-17)

Apostolic Vicars of Southern Manchuria 南滿

- Laurent Guillon, M.E.P. (紀隆) (see above May 10, 1898 – death July 2, 1900)
- Marie-Félix Choulet, M.E.P. (蘇裴理斯) (February 21, 1901 – July 1, 1920), Titular Bishop of Zela (February 21, 1901 – death July 31, 1923)
  - Coadjutor Vicar Apostolic (never succeeded) Vincent-François-Joseph Sage (善味增爵), M.E.P. (1914-07-20 – death 1917-09-20, Titular Bishop of Cusæ (1914-07-20 – 1917-09-20)
- Jean-Marie-Michel Blois, M.E.P. (衛忠藩) (December 19, 1921 – December 3, 1924 see below), previously Apostolic Vicar of Southern Manchuria 南滿 (China) (1921-12-19 – 1924-12-03) & Titular Bishop of Lambæsis (1921-12-29 – 1946-04-11)

Apostolic Vicar of Shenyang 瀋陽

- Jean-Marie-Michel Blois, M.E.P. (衛忠藩) (see above December 3, 1924 – April 11, 1946 see below)

Metropolitan Archbishops of Shenyang 瀋陽

- Jean-Marie-Michel Blois, M.E.P. (衛忠藩) (see above April 11, 1946 – death May 18, 1946)
- Ignatius Pi Shu-shi (皮漱石) (July 26, 1949 – death May 16, 1978)
- uncanonical Paul Xu Zhen-jiang (徐振江) (1981 – death 1984-06-22) (consecrated Bishop without papal mandate 1981-07-24)
- Lawrence Zhang Huai-liang (張化良) (1988 – death April 1989) (consecrated Bishop 1988-10-16)
- Pius Jin Pei-xian (金沛獻) (1989 – 2008-0-29 death 2008-11-04) (consecrated Bishop 1989-05-21)
- Paul Pei Junmin (June 29, 2008 – ...); succeeded as former Coadjutor Archbishop of Shenyang (2006-05-07 – 2008-06-29)

== Province ==
Its ecclesiastical province comprises the Metropolitan's own Archdiocese and the following suffragan bishoprics:

- Roman Catholic Diocese of Chifeng 赤峰
- Roman Catholic Diocese of Fushun 撫順
- Roman Catholic Diocese of Jilin 吉林
- Roman Catholic Diocese of Jehol 熱河 in Chengde
- Roman Catholic Diocese of Sipingjie 四平街
- Roman Catholic Diocese of Yanji 延吉
- Roman Catholic Diocese of Yingkou 營口

== Sources and external links ==
- GCatholic.org, with incumbent biography links
- Catholic Hierarchy
- UCAN Diocese Profile
