= Paul Pei Junmin =

- Metropolitan Archbishop of Shenyang
- Church: Sacred Heart of Jesus Cathedral, Shenyang
- Archdiocese: Roman Catholic Archdiocese of Shenyang
- Province: Liaoning
- Installed: 2008
- Predecessor: Pius Jin Pei-xian

Orders
- Ordination: 1992
- Consecration: 2006

Personal details
- Born: 2 February 1969 (age 57) Harqin Zuoyi Mongol Autonomous County, Liaoning, China
- Denomination: Roman Catholic
- Education: Shenyang Catholic Seminary; St. Charles Borromeo Seminary

Chinese name
- Traditional Chinese: 裴軍民
- Simplified Chinese: 裴军民
Transcriptions
Standard Mandarin
- Hanyu Pinyin: Péi Jūnmín

Paul Pei Junmin (Chinese: 裴军民; born 2 February 1969) is a Chinese Catholic prelate and Metropolitan Archbishop of Shenyang since 2008.

== Biography ==
Pei was born in Harqin Zuoyi Mongol Autonomous County, Liaoning in 1969, to a Catholic family. After graduating from Shenyang Catholic Seminary in 1990, he worked in the Sacred Heart of Jesus Cathedral, Shenyang.

He was ordained a priest on May 31, 1992. In 1993, he went to study at the St. Charles Borromeo Seminary.

He returned to China at the end of 1996 and that same year taught at Shenyang Catholic Seminary. On January 12, 2006, he was appointed coadjutor bishop of Liaoning (Shenyang) archdiocese by the Holy See and was honored pastoral post on May 7, 2006. On June 29, 2008, Bishop Pius Jin Pei-xian retired and Coadjutor Bishop Pei Junmin succeeded his position. In December 2010, he was elected vice-chairman of the Bishops Conference of Catholic Church in China (BCCCC) at the Eighth National Conference of Catholic Representatives in China.

Catholic Church titles
Previous: Pius Jin Pei-xian	Metropolitan Archbishops of Shenyang; 2008	Incumbent
