= Thomas Withers (Royal Navy officer) =

British Royal Navy captain

Captain Thomas Withers
- Born: baptised 17 September 1769; Knapton, Norfolk, England, Great Britain
- Died: 4 July 1843 (age 74); North Walsham, Norfolk
- Burial place: St Nicholas Church, North Walsham, Norfolk
- Alma mater: Christ's Hospital
- Military career
- Allegiance: Great Britain
- Branch: Royal Navy
- Commands: HMS Tartarus
- Other work: Agent (Transport Board)

Thomas Withers (baptised 17 September 1769–4 July 1843) was a British Royal Navy captain.

== Early years ==
Thomas Withers was the son of Thomas and Priscilla Withers. He was baptised 17 September 1769 in the church of St. Peter & St. Paul at Knapton, near North Walsham, in the English county of Norfolk.

On 4 June 1779 Thomas was admitted as a nautical scholar at Christ's Hospital, Newgate, London. He was educated at the school for six years, except for an apparent break between 14 July 1781 and 31 January 1784, during which he was the personal servant of an uncle, Joseph Withers, the purser on the sixth-rate post ship HMS Grana.

== Naval career ==
On 1 December 1785 Withers left Christ's Hospital to become the apprentice of Richard Harding, the captain of the East India Company ship HSC Kent, for seven years.

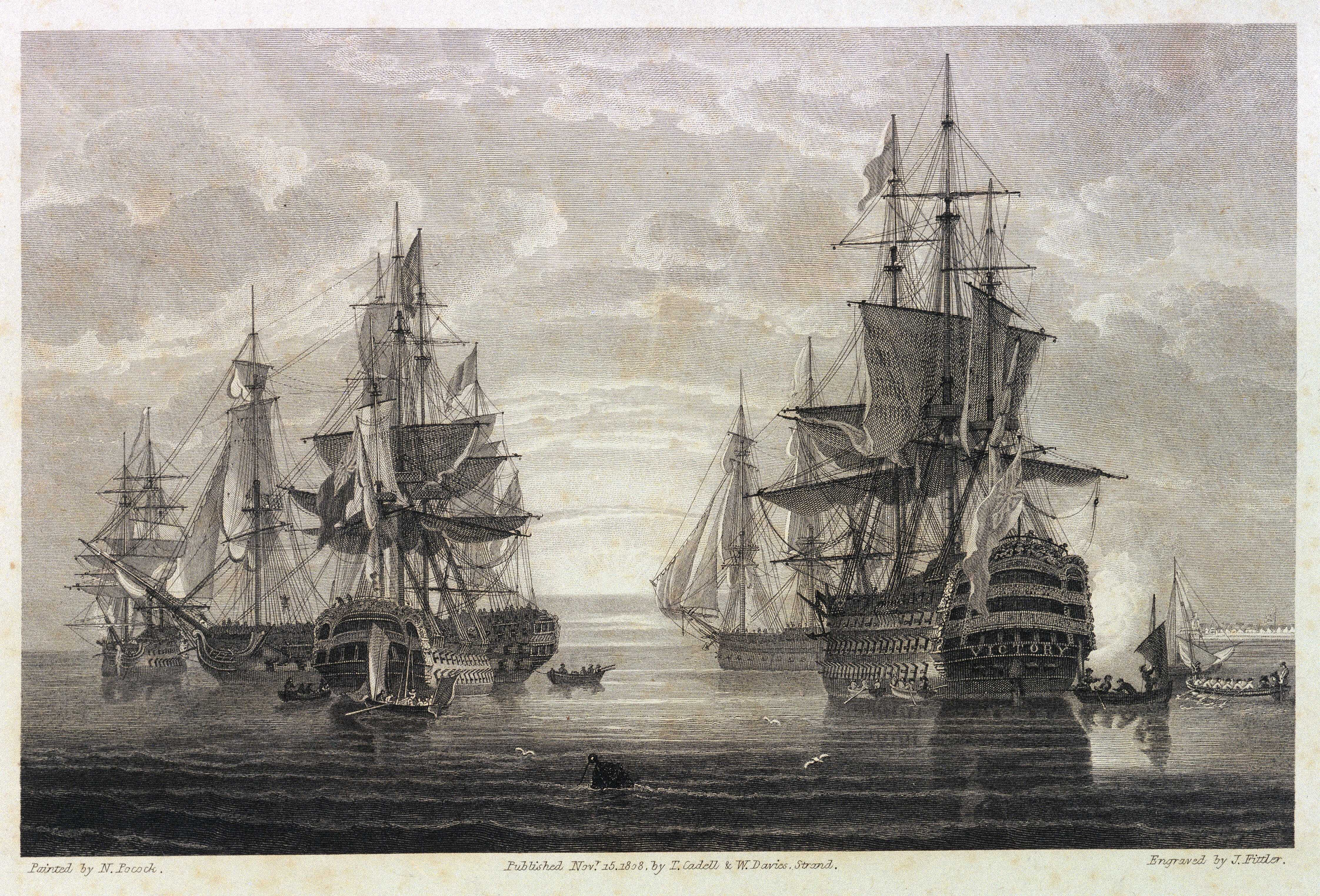
HMS Victory, Captain, Agamemnon, Vanguard, and Elephant in 1808. Withers served aboard the Captain and the Agamemnon under Nelson. (National Maritime Museum, London)

In May 1793 Withers reported to the HMS Agamemnon, which was newly-commissioned by Captain Horatio Nelson. Withers may have had a connection with his captain; as a boy, Nelson had attended the grammar school at North Walsham, a few miles from the village where Withers was born. Withers served on the Agamemnon as a midshipman, the ship's schoolmaster, and the master's mate up until July 1796, when he was transferred with Nelson to the HMS Captain. Withers' time on the Agamemnon coincided with the Mediterranean campaign of 1793–1796. He was landed on Corsica at Bastia and Calvi, and was wounded at Oneglia on 29 August 1795. In November of that year, he was captured at Vado Ligure.

On 15 February 1797, one day after the Battle of Cape St. Vincent, Withers was promoted to the rank of lieutenant into the prize-ship Salvador del Mundo, an appointment that was confirmed a month later on 22 March. From February 1798 to December 1800 he served with Sir Richard Hussey Bickerton on HMS Terrible in the English Channel. He later served with Bickerton on HMS Kent in the Mediterranean and along the coast of Egypt. In August 1802, he was made acting commander of the Egyptian expedition, a commission that was confirmed on 11 April 1803.

For a few months in the end of 1804, Withers commanded a sloop-of-war, HMS Tartarus, operating in the English Channel. The ship was wrecked on a sandbank off Margate on 20 December 1804; the crew was rescued.

In 1805 he was appointed as a transport agent for the Elbe and Weser rivers in Germany. He continued as an agent for 11 years, serving in Sicily, the Ionian Islands, Alexandria, Halifax, and Martinique. Between 1810 and 1816 he was the principal agent for Italy and Spain in the Mediterranean. He was made a post-captain on 13 May 1809.

== Personal life ==
On 1st May 1822, Thomas Withers RN married Melissa Kemp from Swafield at St Nicholas Church, North Walsham.

After the defeat of Napoleon and the end of the war, Withers retired from serving in the Royal Navy, and lived with his family in North Walsham. He died there on 4 July 1843.

== Sources ==
- James, William (1902) [1824]. Naval History Of Great Britain. London: Macmillan.
- Laughton, John Knox (1900). "Withers, Thomas". In Lee, Sidney (ed.). Dictionary of National Biography. Vol. 62. London: Smith, Elder & Co.
- Mackie, Charles (1901). Norfolk Annals: A Chronological Record of Remarkable Events in the Nineteenth Century. Norwich, UK: Norfolk Chronicle.
