= William Suffolk =

British murderer (died 1797)

- Died: 24 March 1797; Norwich Castle Hill
- Cause of death: Hanging
- Resting place: Gibbetted at North Walsham, later buried
- Known for: Murder of Mary Beck
- Criminal charges: Murder
- Criminal penalty: Execution

William Suffolk was a murderer who killed Mary Beck, who had ended her affair with him, in the parish of North Walsham in Norfolk, England. He was sentenced to death and was hanged at Castle Hill in Norwich on 24 March 1797, gaining the nickname Bloody Will. After no surgeon claimed his body, his gibbeting was ordered on the outskirts of North Walsham. The gibbet remained with his bones inside until the enclosure of the land. His remains were buried and the gibbet's wood was used for housing.

== Early life ==
William Suffolk was born in the village of Swafield, near North Walsham. By 1797 he was 46 and married with four children, was living with his long-widowed father, and was working his family smallholding.

== Murder of Mary Beck ==
At this time Suffolk had a relationship out of wedlock with his neighbour Mary Beck, resulting in her becoming pregnant; they went to "the grass counties", and she gave birth to the child in secret, before both were "confederate" in the killing of the child. The pair later returned to their respective households.

Beck had one more night with Suffolk before ending their affair, a matter pressured by her brother. The next day, Suffolk spoke to Beck near Witton Heath as she returned from selling three bushels of wheat, claiming that the profits she had obtained were his. Beck stated that she owed her brother the money and as such the money was not hers to give. The argument escalated and Beck stated that she no longer wished to be in Suffolk's company. He then struck her with a cudgel he was carrying, and after she had fallen he struck her three further times, cracking her skull. Suffolk then dragged her body to the cart track and left her head in the rut in an attempt to make her death look like an accident.

Suffolk returned home but was spotted by a group of locals who challenged him as to why he was spattered with blood, and they found that his answers did not add up. Beck was then discovered and the parish constable was summoned; she was able to state that Suffolk had struck her before her death.

== Execution and gibbeting ==
Suffolk was tried at the Norfolk Lent Assizes at Thetford, where he told the justice that he "had two more to murder... my wife and Mary's brother." He was convicted for the murder of Mary Beck, and sentenced to death on 17 March 1797. On 24 March, Suffolk was executed on Castle Hill in Norwich, before a large crowd. In broadsheets and ballads, he was portrayed as 'Bloody Will' Suffolk, and he was additionally the subject of church sermons around the county.

Following his execution, no surgeon came forward to claim the body, so the court ordered instead that it be hung in chains "near as may be where the said felony was perpetrated", on common land on the outskirts of North Walsham. This was a 15-mile journey. For gibbeting, Suffolk's body was parboiled and tarred. The full execution and gibbeting cost £39, 16s, 9d. It is not clear where this gibbet exactly resided; one source stated that it was on a hill between the between the town and Royston Bridge, and another stated that it stood by Gibbett Loke which led from Hamlet House (TG28713100) to Melbourn House.

Suffolk's gibbet was taken down the same year that the parish was enclosed. The remains of Suffolk, largely having been depleted by souvenir hunters, were buried without ceremony in June 1803. The gibbet post was cut up and used for building cottages at Knapton, with one of the beams being preserved at Royston House until it was given to "a distant museum".
