= Our Lady of Seven Sorrows Cathedral, Suzhou =

Catholic church in Jiangsu, China

Coordinates: 31.3004°N 120.5774°E

Our Lady of Seven Sorrows Cathedral
- Yangjiaqiao Catholic Church
- 杨家桥天主堂
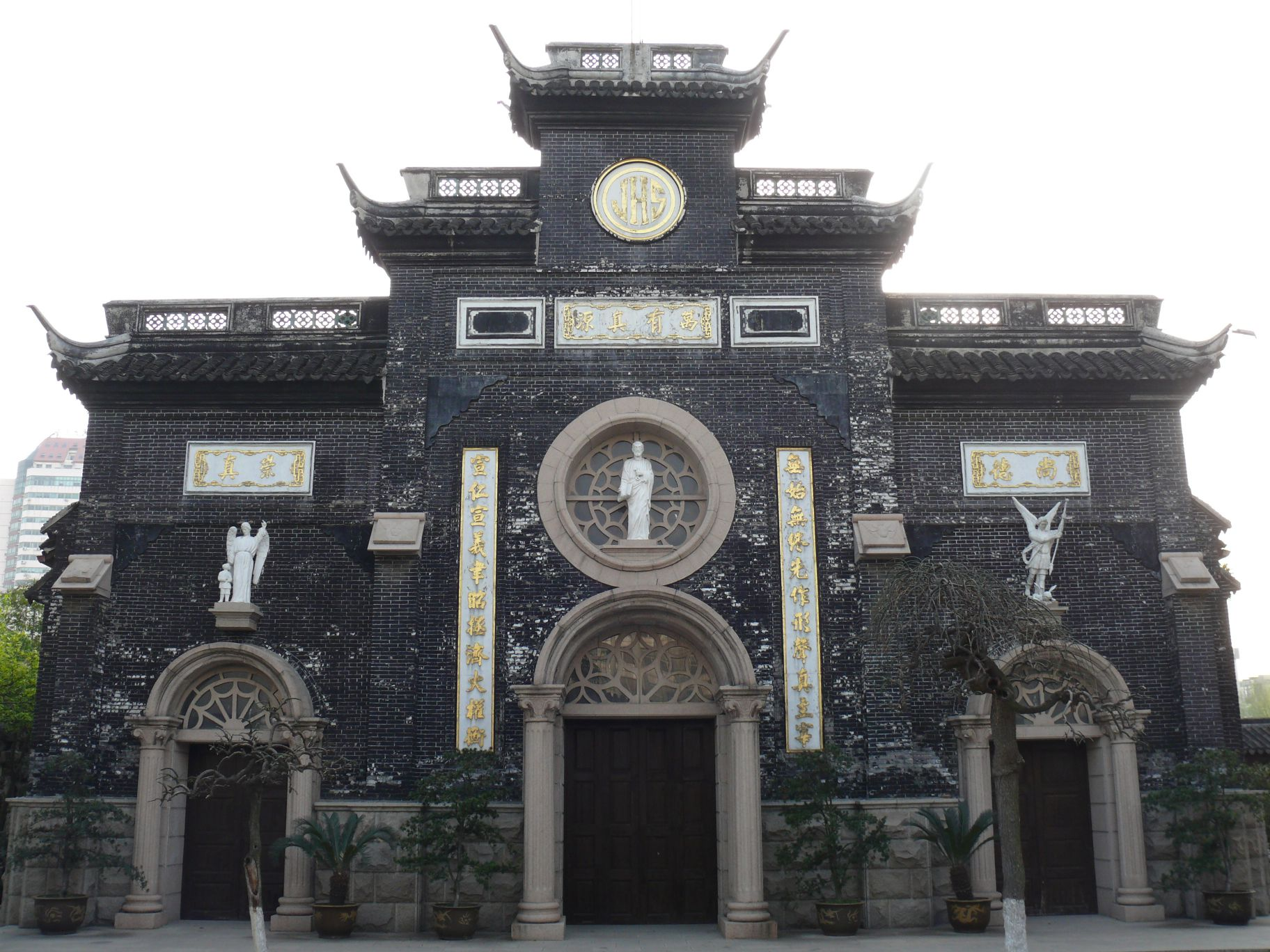

- Location within Jiangsu Location within China
- Location: Suzhou, Jiangsu
- Address: 1162 Sanxiang Road, Suzhou, Jiangsu, China
- Country: China
- Language: Chinese
- Denomination: Catholic

History
- Dedication: Our Lady of Sorrows

Administration
- Province: Nanjing
- Diocese: Diocese of Suzhou

Clergy
- Bishop: Joseph Xu Honggen

Our Lady of Seven Sorrows Cathedral, Suzhou
- Traditional Chinese: 聖母七苦堂
- Simplified Chinese: 圣母七苦堂
- Literal meaning: Holy Mother seven sufferings church
Transcriptions
Standard Mandarin
- Hanyu Pinyin: Shèngmǔ qī kǔ táng

The Cathedral of Our Lady of Seven Sorrows (Note: Chinese: 圣母七苦堂), also known as the Yangjiaqiao Catholic Church (杨家桥天主堂)) is a Catholic cathedral in Suzhou, Jiangsu, China. (Note: The Suzhou Municipal Government assigns the name "cathedral" to both this church and the church at the Suzhou Industrial Park, where the Bishop's Office is located. The second occurrence is likely a misinterpretation of the Chinese word "大教堂", i.e. "big church".) It is known for its architectural hybridity between Chinese and western styles. The cathedral is located at 1162 Sanxiang Road, Suzhou.

== History ==
According to the Suzhou Government, the local parish started as the residence of a Catholic merchant and a gathering place for local Catholics in the Qianlong Era of the Qing Dynasty. There used to be a previous church building on the same site built in 1866 informally called "Hall of the Fishing Boats" (网船公所). The current church building began its construction in 1893 under the leadership of the French priest Joseph Deffond. In 1949, the Roman Catholic Diocese of Suzhou was established, and the church became the cathedral of the diocese.

In 1958, the cathedral was appropriated as a school for socialist education. It was used for other purposes in the 1960s before being returned to the Catholic Church in 1981. The cathedral suffered a flood in 1991 and became listed as a culturally protected site (文物保护单位) of Suzhou that year. In 2000, a traditional gallery and greeneries were added.

== Architecture ==
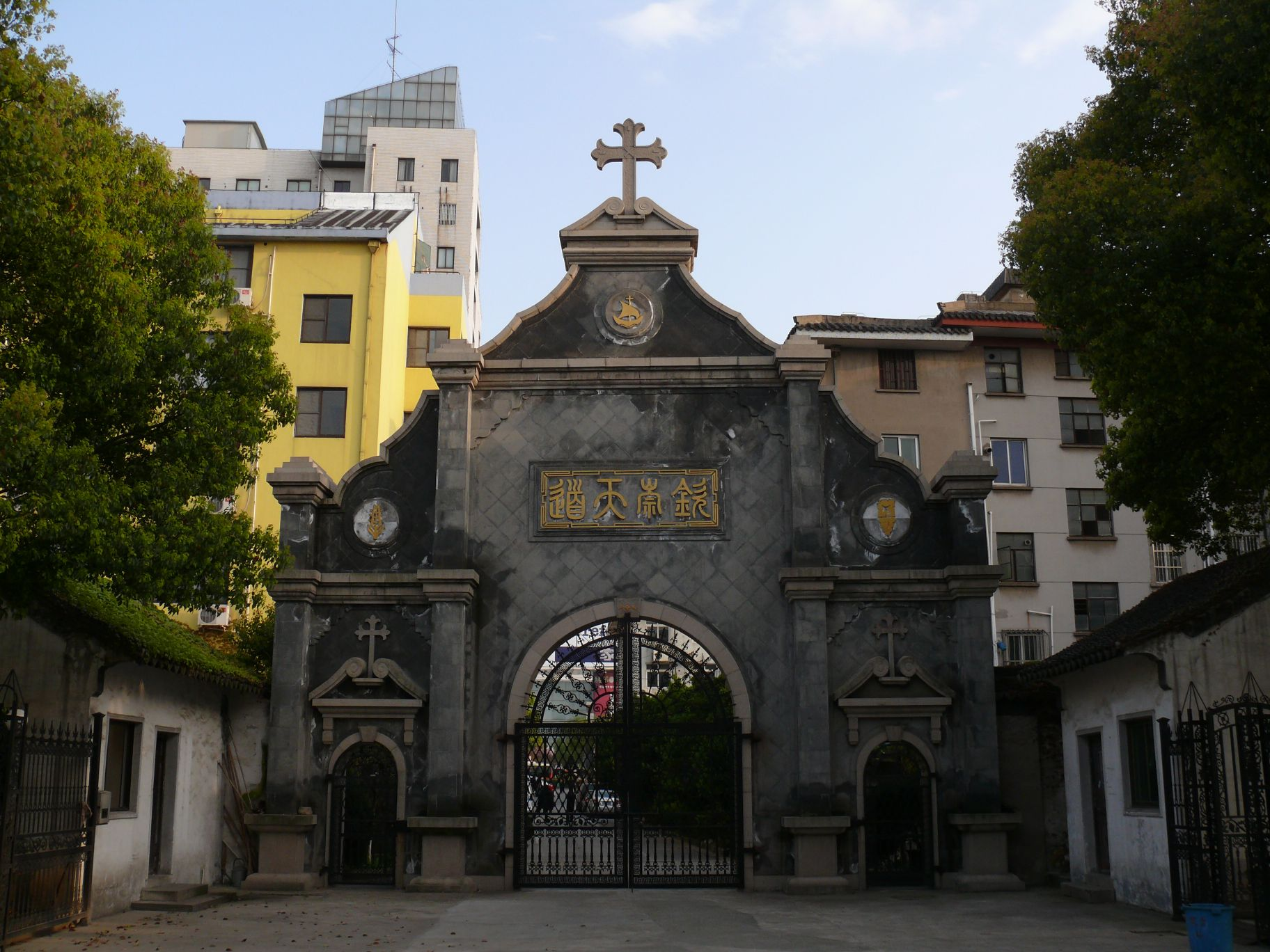
The gates of the cathedral

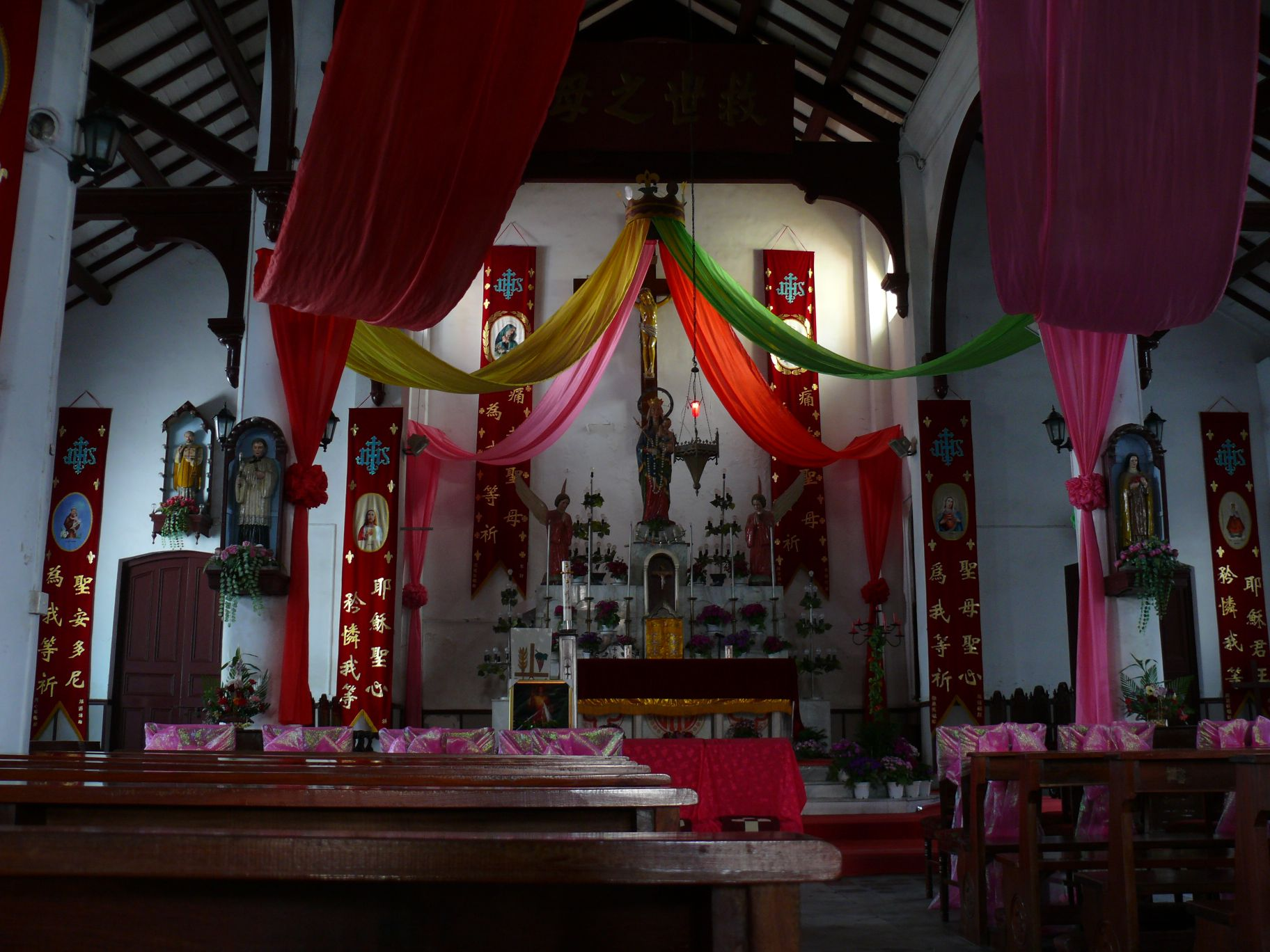
The interior of the cathedral

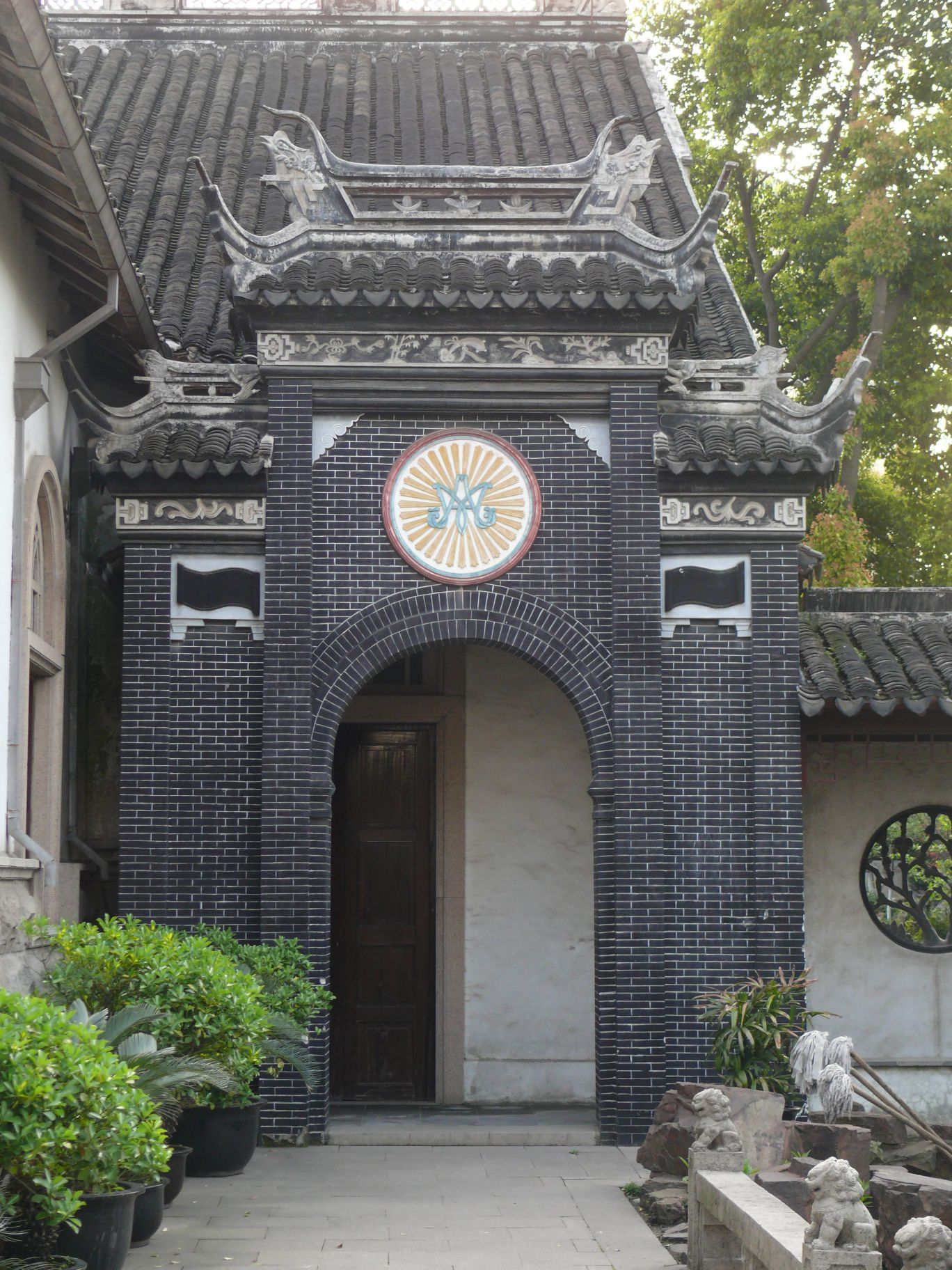
The cathedral employs Chinese architecture and western symbols

The cathedral building is 44.9 meters long and 29.3 meters wide. The roof ridge has a height of 10.9 meters. According to Pan et al., the cathedral employs a "hybridity" of architectural styles. The cathedral used Suzhou traditional building methods, and has a westwork in the style of a paifang. However, it has a European open timber roof structure, very similar to the one of St Nicholas Church, North Walsham. Its pillars are wooden on the inside but made of bricks on the outside.

In 1982 and 2000, the cathedral underwent renovations, in which the IHS Christogram, stained glass, icons, Corinthian capitals and stone arches were added.

== See also ==
- List of cathedrals in China
- Roman Catholic Diocese of Suzhou
- Catholicism in China
- Our Lady of Sorrows
