= Thomas Withers (disambiguation) =

Thomas Withers may refer to:

- Thomas Withers (1886–1953), American navy officer
- Thomas Withers (Royal Navy officer) (1769–1843), British navy captain
- Thomas Jefferson Withers (1804–1865), American politician
