= Bradfield, Norfolk =

Village in Norfolk, England

Coordinates: 52.849°N 1.371°E

Bradfield
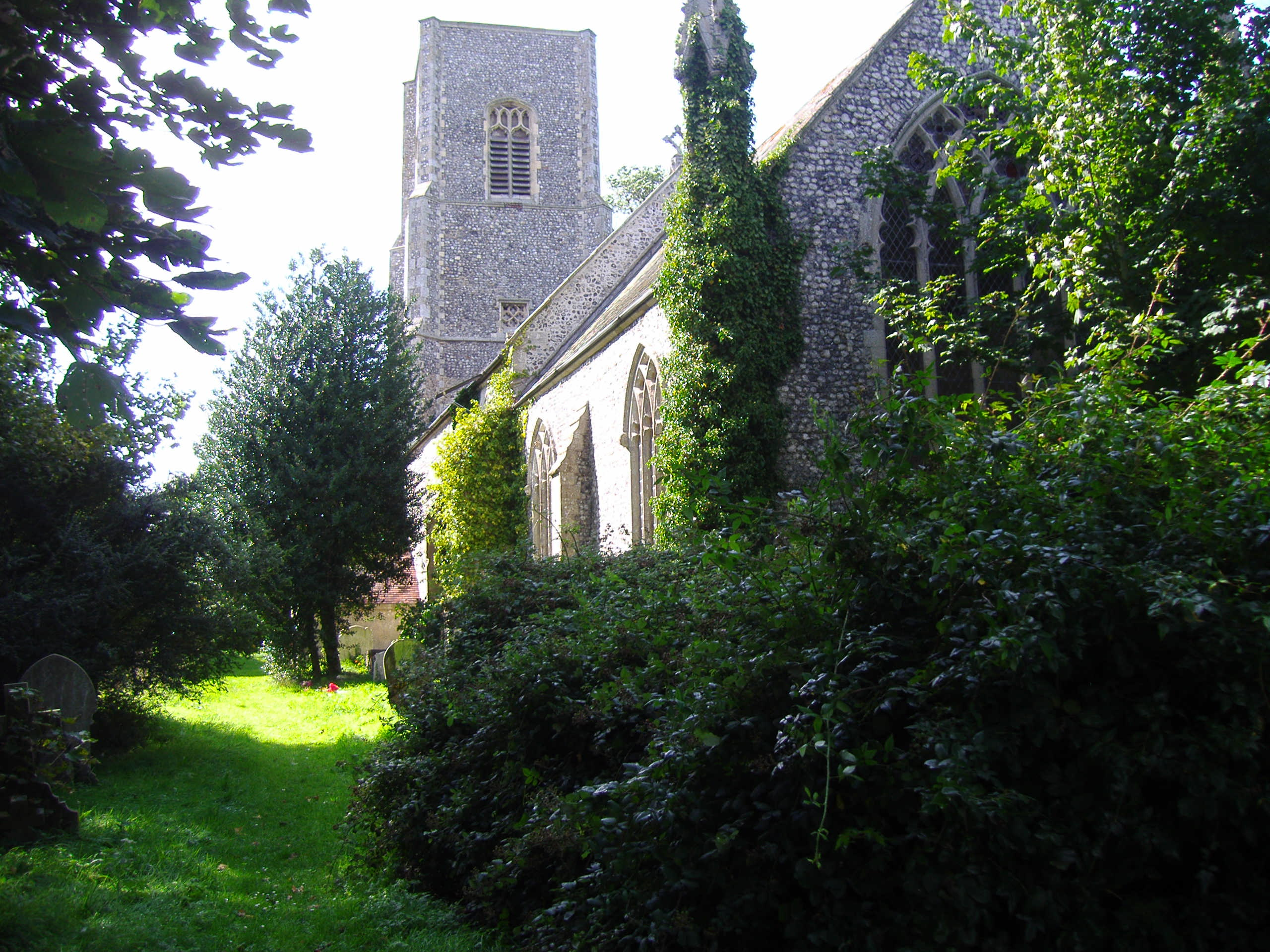
- Saint Giles Parish Church, Bradfield

- Location within Norfolk
- OS grid reference: TG2733
  - London: 135 miles (217 km)
- Civil parish: Swafield
- District: North Norfolk
- Shire county: Norfolk
- Region: East
- Country: England
- Sovereign state: United Kingdom
- Post town: NORTH WALSHAM
- Postcode district: NR28
- Dialling code: 01263
- Police: Norfolk
- Fire: Norfolk
- Ambulance: East of England

Bradfield is a village and former civil parish, now in the parish of Swafield, in the North Norfolk district of the English county of Norfolk. It is 7.6 miles (12.2 km) south-south-east of Cromer, 18.1 miles (29.1 km) north-north-east of Norwich and 135 miles (217 km) north-east of London. The nearest town, North Walsham, is 3 miles (4.8 km) south of the village.

== History ==
Bradfield's name is of Anglo-Saxon origin, although the village is not mentioned in the Domesday Book of 1086.

In 1931 the parish had a population of 136. On 1 April 1935 the parish was abolished and merged with Swafield.

== Governance ==
Bradfield is part of the electoral ward of Trunch for local elections and is part of the district of North Norfolk. It is part of the North Norfolk parliamentary constituency.

== St. Giles' Church ==
Bradfield's parish church is dedicated to Saint Giles and is a large church for what is now a small community. The bukilding was, however, once bigger. There is evidence of this both inside and out, because the north and south arcades were filled in when the aisles were demolished. The pillars and arches can still be seen, set in the walls, the early 14th century capitals revealing the age of the church.

The porch is dated 1786, along with the churchwardens' names, which is probably shortly after the aisles were demolished. At the east end of the church there is a decorated window and pentagonal buttresses with stone pinnacles added in 1864 when some restoration work was carried out on the church. Above the chancel arch there is a wall painting of Christ in Judgment. He sits on a rainbow showing his wounds. The wall painting dates from the 15th century.

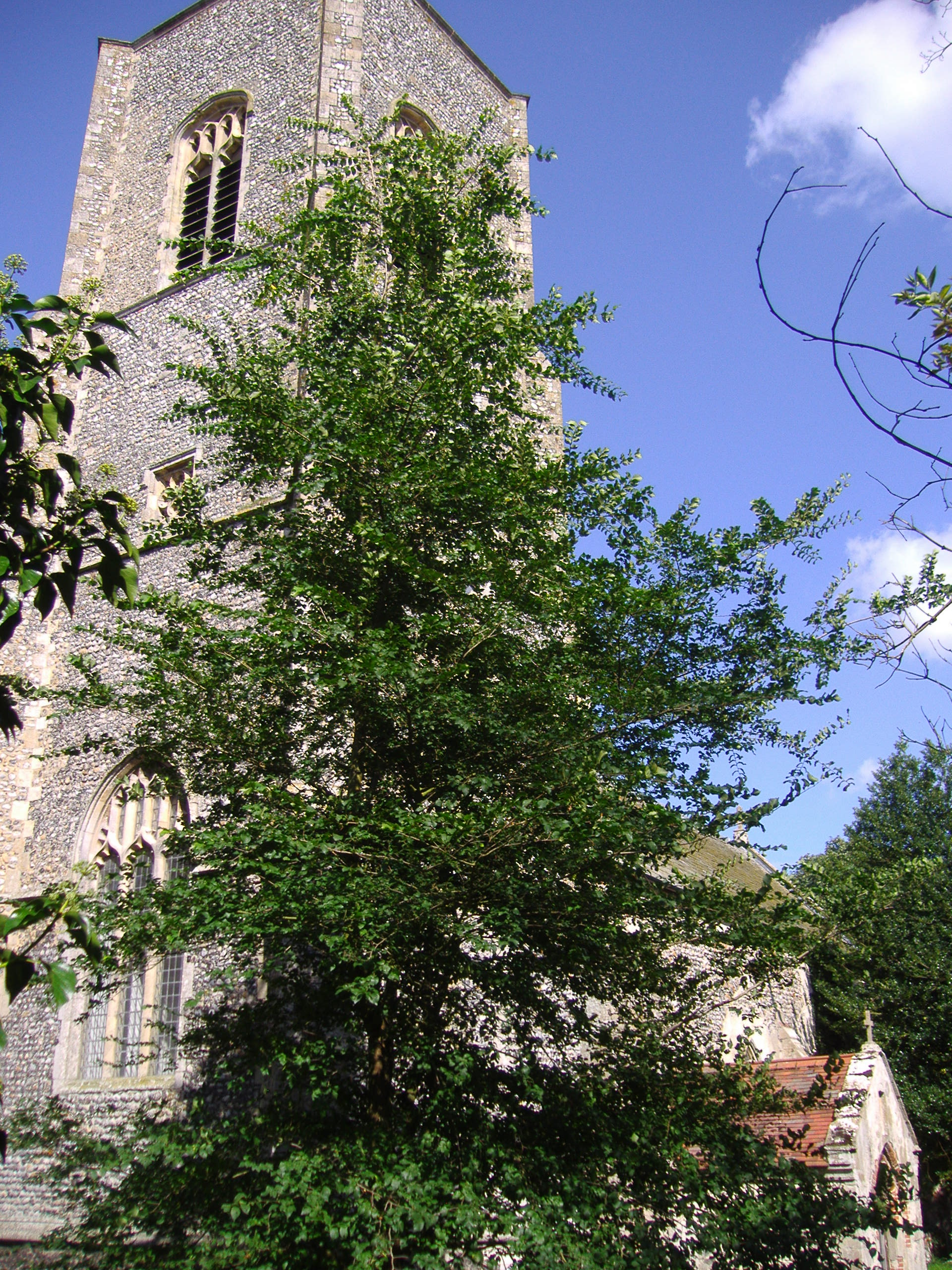
The church tower

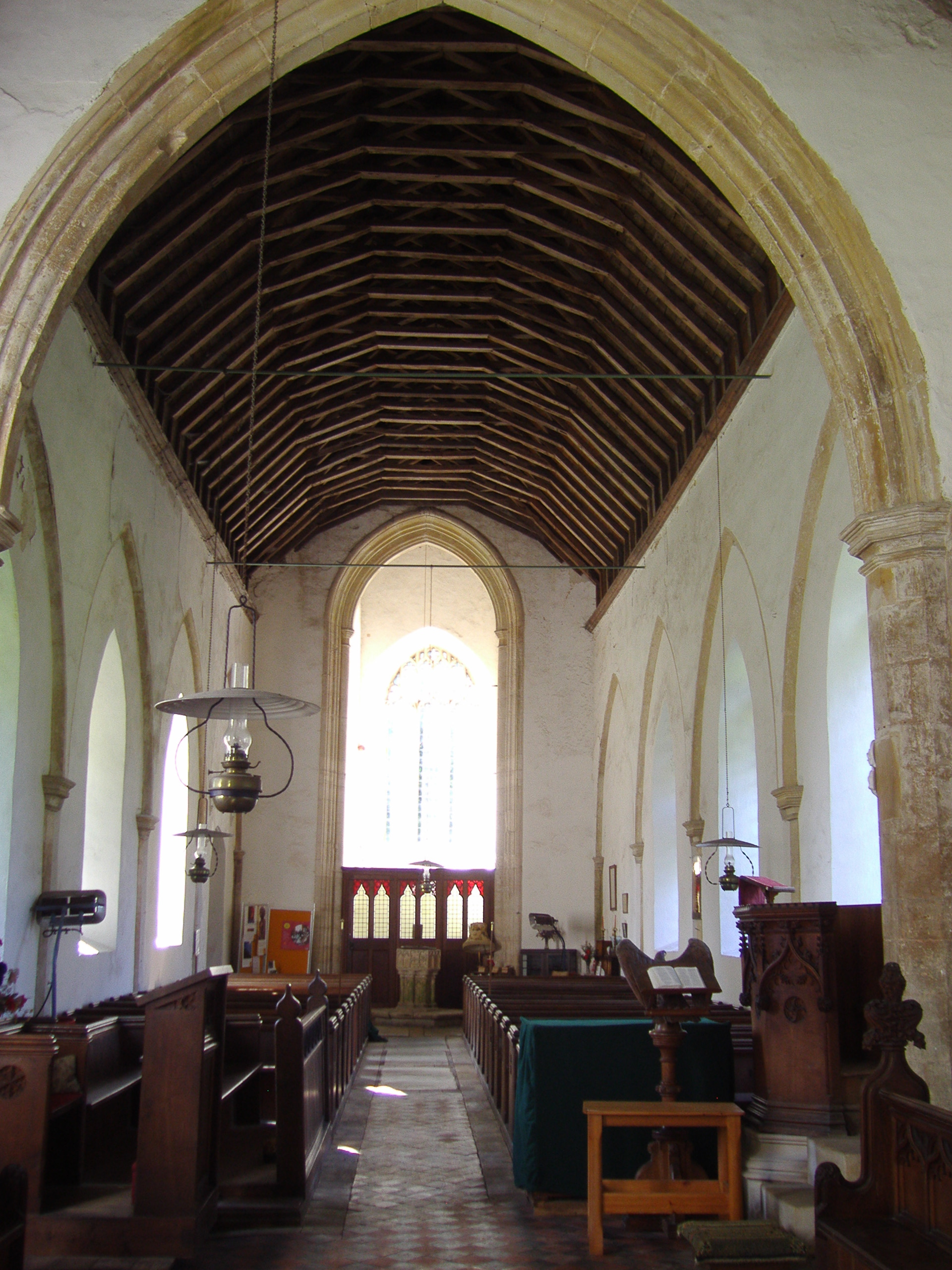
The chancel viewed from the altar

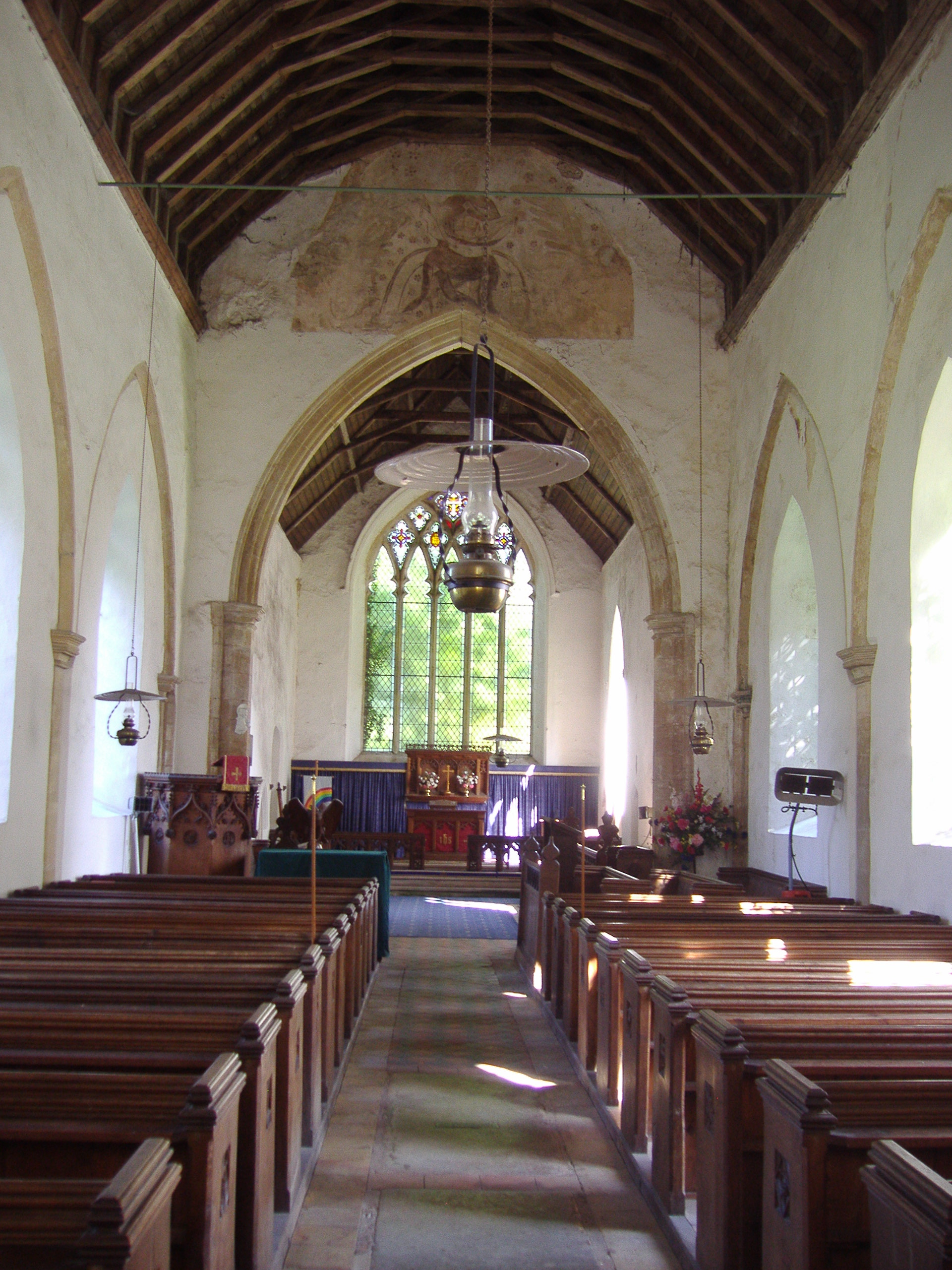
The altar and east window

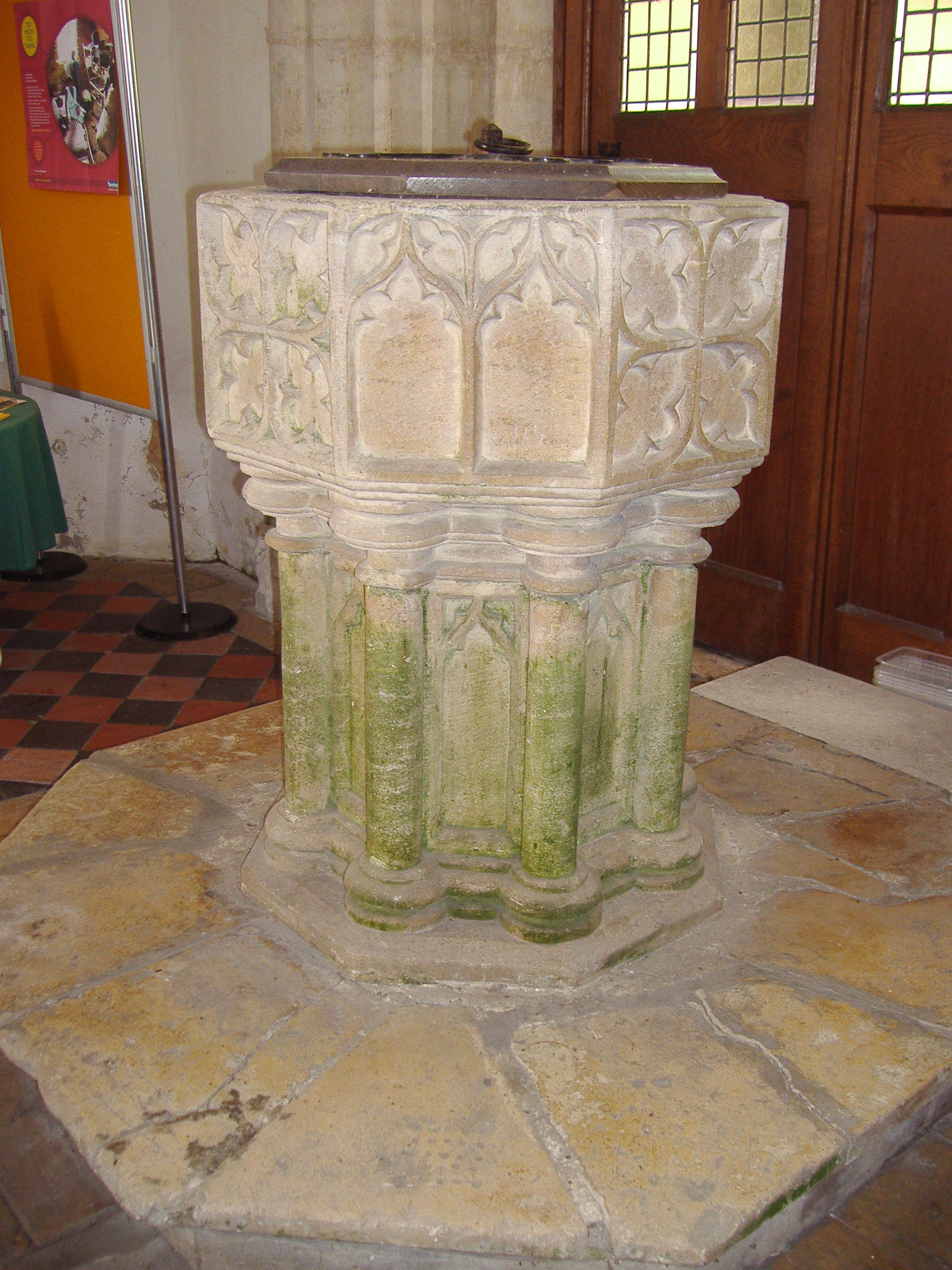
The font
