= Joseph Xu =

Joseph Xu may refer to:

- Joseph Xu Zhixuan (1916–2008), Chinese Roman Catholic bishop
- Joseph Xu Honggen (born 1962), Chinese Roman Catholic bishop

== See also ==
- Hsu King-shing (1910–1986), also known as Joseph Hsu, Chinese footballer and football manager
- Xu Haiqiao (born 1983), also known as Joe Xu, Chinese actor
