= Roman Catholic Diocese of Suzhou =

Roman Catholic diocese in China

Diocese of Suzhou Dioecesis Suceuvensis 天主教苏州教区
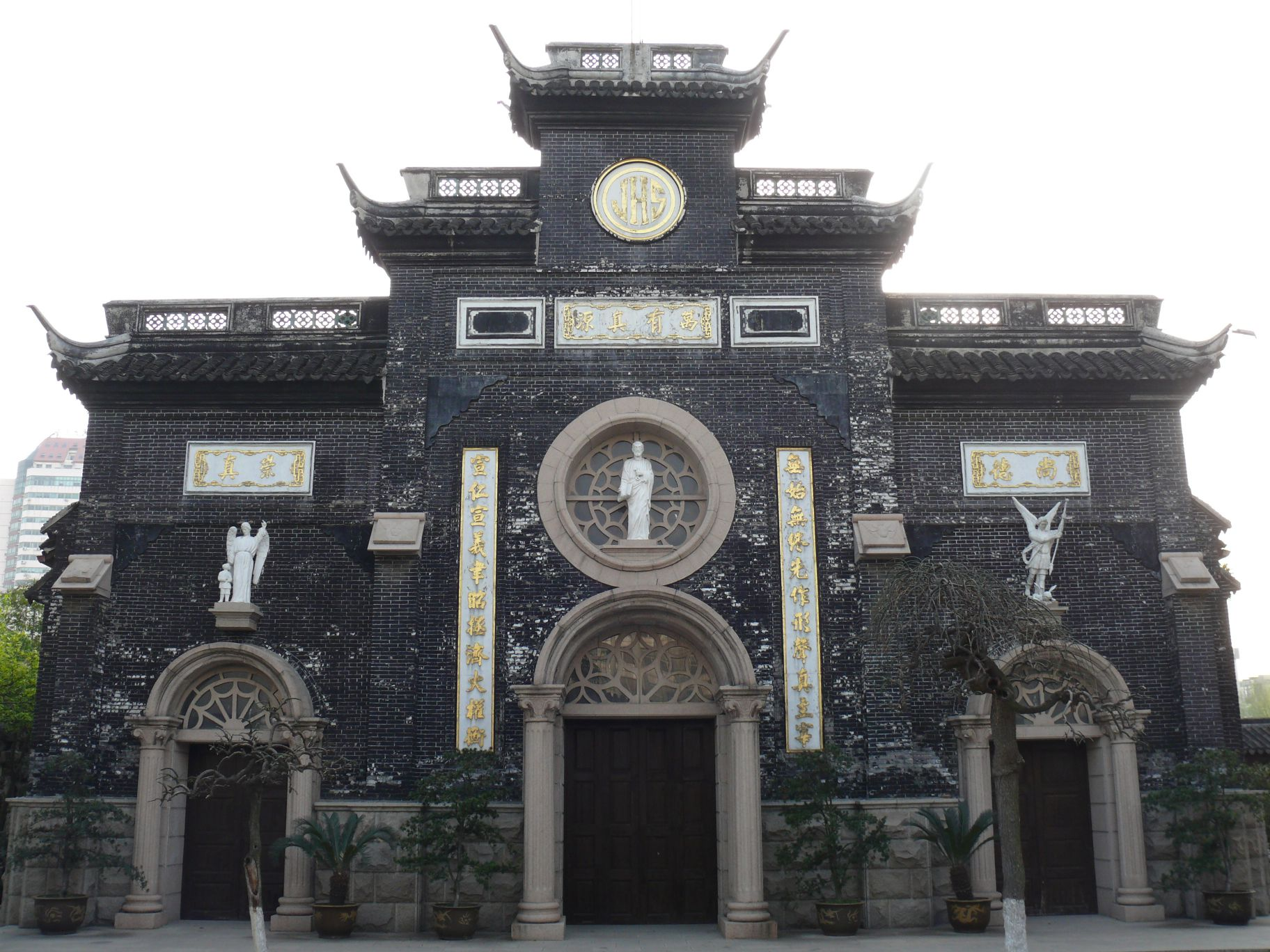
- Cathedral of Our Lady of Seven Sorrows, Suzhou

Location
- Country: China
- Ecclesiastical province: Ecclesiastical Province of Nanjing
- Metropolitan: Nanjing

Statistics
- Area: 8,488 km^{2} (3,277 sq mi)

Information
- Rite: Latin Rite
- Established: 1949
- Cathedral: Cathedral of Our Lady of Seven Sorrows, Suzhou

Current leadership
- Pope: Leo XIV
- Bishop: Joseph Xu Honggen
- Metropolitan Archbishop: Francis Savio Lu Xinping

The Roman Catholic Diocese of Suzhou (Latin: Dioecesis Suceuvensis, Chinese: 天主教苏州教区) is a diocese located in Suzhou, Jiangsu, China, under the Ecclesiastical Province of Nanjing. It covers the entire city of Suzhou.

== History ==
=== Ming dynasty ===
The Italian Jesuit missionary Matteo Ricci introduced Catholicism into Jiangsu in 1599. He stayed in Suzhou in January of that year. In 1616, Giulio Aleni founded a church in Changshu, which is currently a city in the Suzhou Diocese.

=== Qing dynasty ===
In Suzhou city, Italian missionaries established the first Catholic church in 1649. By 1664, there were over 500 Catholics in Suzhou city and over 10,000 Catholics in Changshu.

In 1724, the Yongzheng Emperor proscribed Catholicism in China. His son, the Qianlong Emperor, continued the practice. In 1814, the Jiaqing Emperor further codified the prohibition of general Christianity. The Daoguang Emperor rescinded most anti-Christian edicts in 1844.

In 1853, the Mission sui iuris of Suzhou was established. It later became a deanery under the Jiangnan Apostolic Prefecture in 1855.

=== Republic of China ===
In 1922, the Deanery of Suzhou was included under the newly established Jiangsu Apostolic Prefecture, which changed its name to Nanjing Apostolic Prefecture in 1926. The Shanghai Apostolic Prefecture, which contained the Suzhou Deanery, was separated from the Nanjing Prefecture in 1933, and became a diocese in 1946. The Suzhou Deanery was elevated into a diocese and separated from the Shanghai Diocese on 9 June 1949.

=== People's Republic of China ===
Upon the founding of the PRC, there were about 34 clergy members and 31,350 Catholics in the diocese. During the Cultural Revolution, many historical churches of the diocese were damaged. Church activities gradually resumed in the 1980s. In 1992, there were about 8 priests, 18 nuns, and 50,000 Catholics in the diocese.

==== Yushan Forum ====
Since 2018, the diocese has been a co-sponsor of the Yushan Forum (Chinese: 渔山论坛), according to the Bureau of Religious and Ethnic Affairs of Suzhou (Chinese: 苏州市民族宗教事务局). The forum's topics of each time are listed below:

- October 2018: The Sinicization of Catholic Literature and Art
- January 2022, September 2022: Adherence to the Sinicization of Catholicism

== Bishops ==
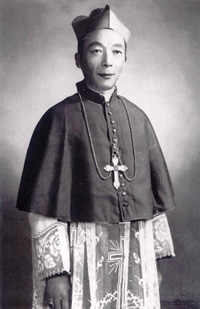
Ignatius Kung Pin-Mei, first bishop of Suzhou in 1949

The first bishop of Suzhou was Cardinal Ignatius Kung Pin-Mei (simplified Chinese: 龚品梅; traditional Chinese: 龔品梅). He was consecrated in 1949. Later he was arrested in 1955 and released in 1985. He left China for the United States in 1988 and died in 2000. Kung was named Cardinal in pectore by Pope John Paul II in 1979. His membership in the College of Cardinals was made public in 1991, after Kung left China.

According to the Chinese Province of the Jesuits, the auxiliary bishop Joseph Fan Zhongliang (Chinese: 范忠良) would have automatically succeeded as the bishop of Suzhou Diocese after Kung's death. Fan was secretly consecrated in 1985. However, he was not recognized by the Chinese government. He died in 2014.

=== Catholic Patriotic Association ===
Ignatius Shen Chuming (Chinese: 沈初鸣) became the vicar general of Suzhou in 1956. He was elected bishop in 1958 and consecrated in 1959. He was a standing member of the national Catholic Patriotic Association (CPA) of China. The year of his death is uncertain: according to Catholic-Hierarchy.org, he died in 1966; according to the Committee of Ethnic and Religious Affairs of Jiangsu (Chinese: 江苏省民族宗教事务委员会), he died in 1974.

Matthias Ma Longlin (Chinese: 马龙麟) was elected and consecrated bishop in 1981. He later became the chair of the CPA of Suzhou. He died in 1999.

In 1999, the CPA appointed Joseph Xu Honggen (Chinese: 徐宏根) as the bishop of Suzhou, and he later also received the appointment from the Holy See. In 2006, Xu was officially consecrated Bishop at the Cathedral of Our Lady of Seven Sorrows, Suzhou. In 2016, Pope Francis met Bishop Xu in Vatican City, making Xu the first ever mainland Chinese bishop to meet the Pope.

== Churches ==
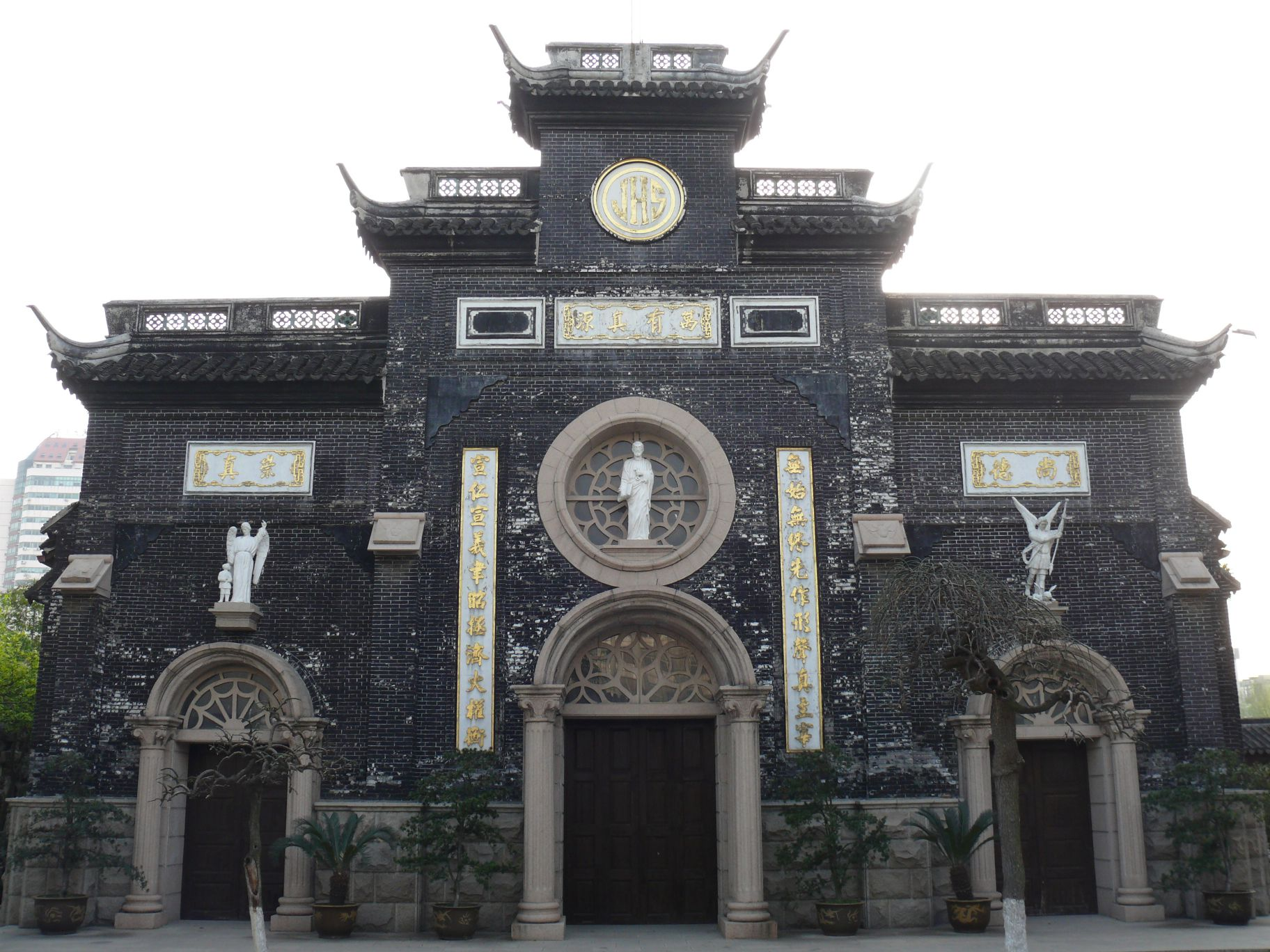
Cathedral of Our Lady of Seven Sorrows, Suzhou

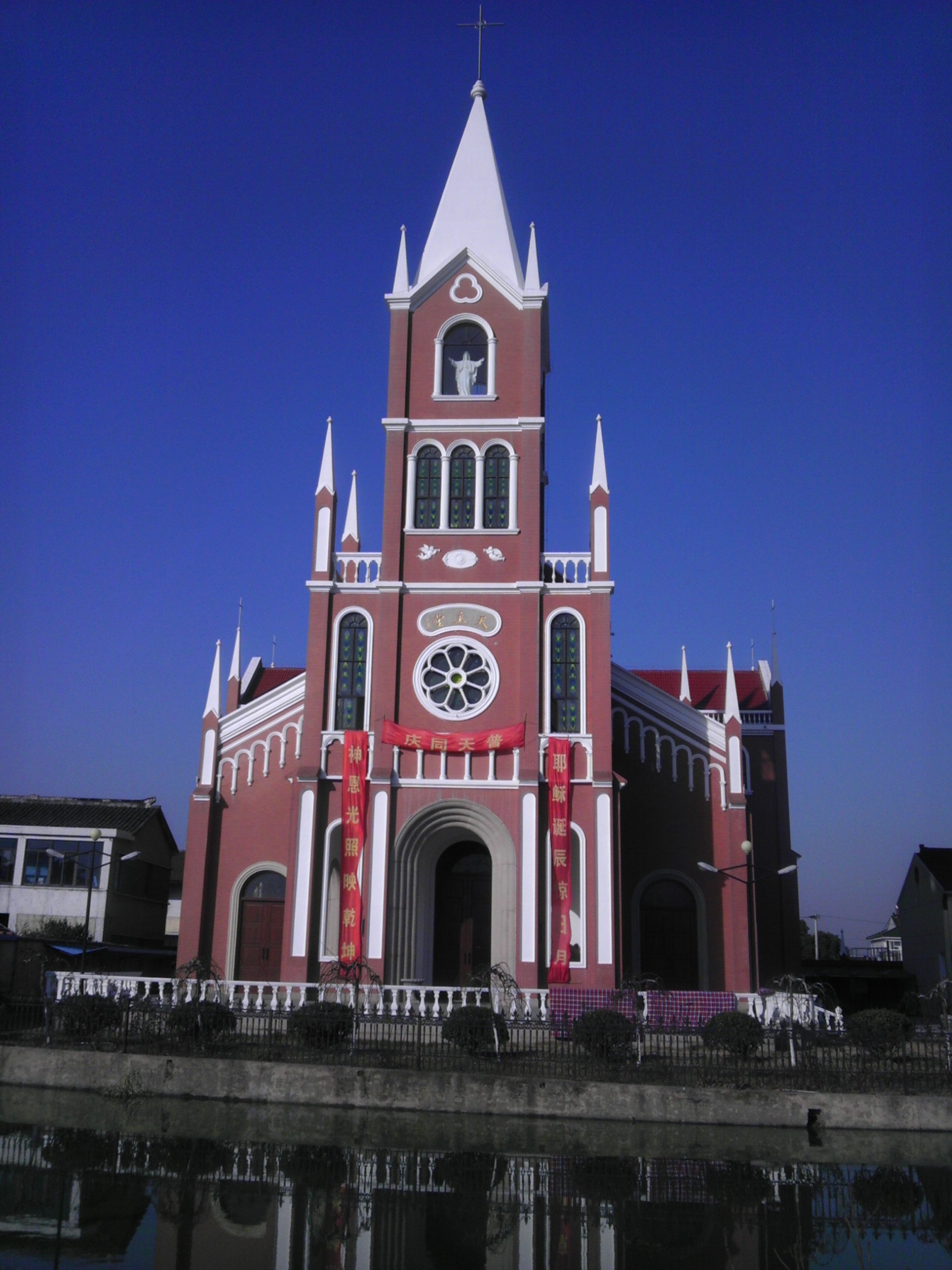
Tangjiao Catholic Church, Changshu

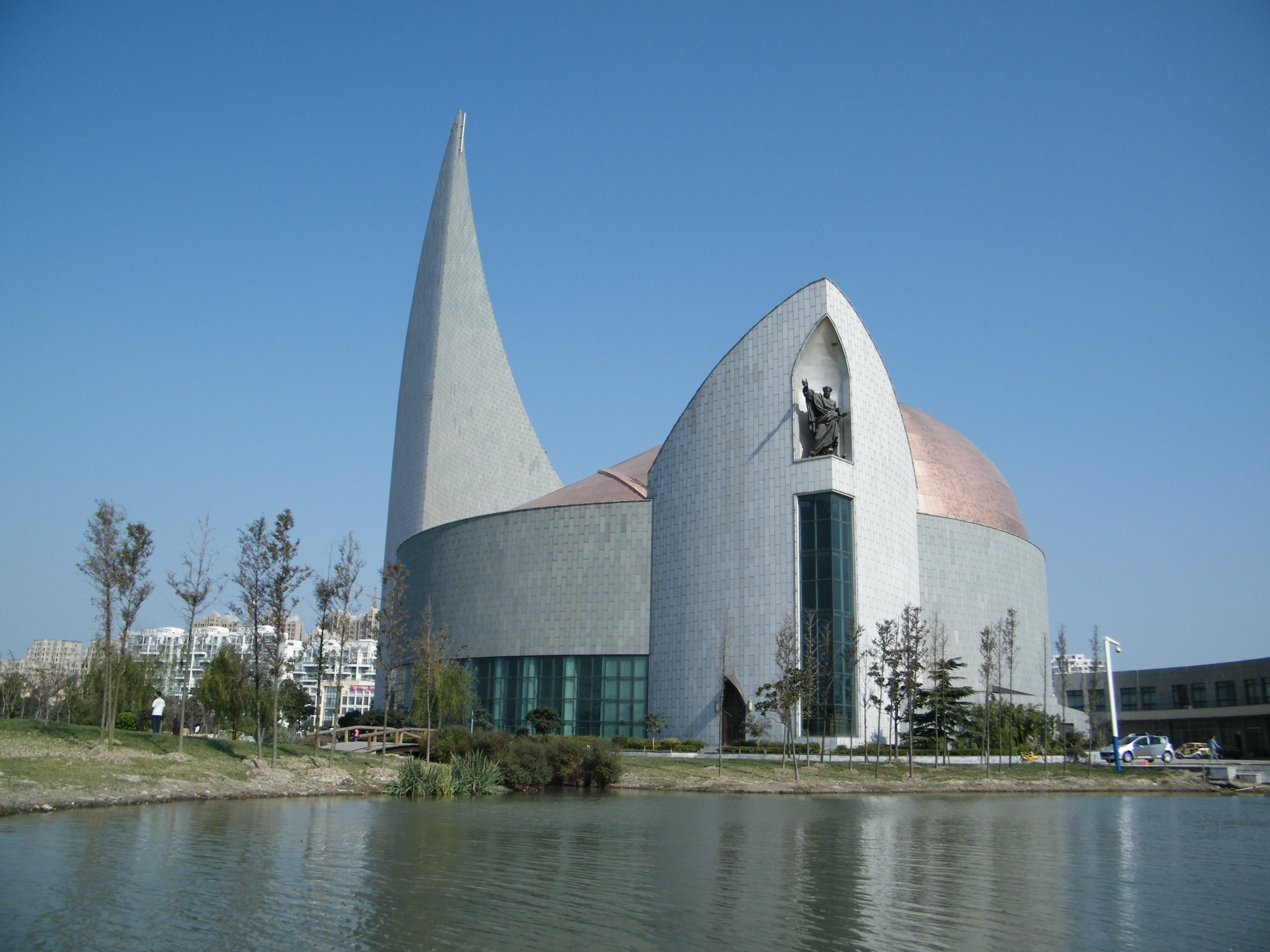
Xiaohengtang Catholic Church, Kunshan

According to Jiangsu's Catholic Patriotic Association (CPA), an organization affiliated with the Chinese united front, the diocese contains the following churches:

Suzhou Industrial Park

- Suzhou Industrial Park Catholic Church, where the bishop's office is located. It is the tallest Catholic Church building in China, with its main tower standing 80 metres (260 ft) tall.

Gusu

- Cathedral of Our Lady of Seven Sorrows, also known as Yangjiaqiao Catholic Church
- Daxin Alley Catholic Church (大新巷天主堂)

Xiangcheng

- Xiangcheng Catholic Church (湘城镇天主堂)

Wujiang

- Lili Catholic Church (黎里天主堂)
- Shengze Catholic Church (盛泽天主教堂)

Changshu

- Tangjiao Catholic Church (塘角天主堂)

Zhangjiagang

- Houcheng Catholic Church (后塍天主堂)
- Yangshe Catholic Church (杨舍天主堂)
- Luyuan Catholic Church (鹿苑天主教堂)

Kunshan

- Xiaohengtang Catholic Church (小横塘天主堂): upon its consecration on 2 May 2016, it was the tallest Catholic church in China. It has a 75 metres (246 ft) tall main spire and a boat-shaped structure.
- Lujia Catholic Church (陆家天主堂)

Taicang

- Loudong Catholic Church (娄东天主堂)
- Zhangjing Catholic Church (张泾天主堂)

== See also ==
- Catholicism in China
