= North Walsham High School =

Location
- Spenser Avenue; North Walsham, Norfolk, NR28 9HZ; England
- Coordinates: 52°49′07″N 1°23′36″E

Information
- Type: Academy
- Local authority: Norfolk County Council
- Trust: Enrich Learning Trust
- Department for Education URN: 147505 Tables
- Ofsted: Reports
- Gender: Coeducational
- Age: 11 to 16
- Capacity: 950
- Website: https://www.nwhs.uk/

North Walsham High School is a co-educational secondary school located in North Walsham in the English county of Norfolk. The school was rated as a "Good" school with "Outstanding" leadership and management in December 2023 by Ofsted. On the same site there is the Atrium which boasts sports facilities, a dance studio, a music studio, food technology rooms and a 187 seater theatre that is also used as the town cinema.

== History ==
The school gained specialist status as an Arts College in 2005. A redevelopment of North Walsham High School, including the opening of a new enterprise centre was completed in summer 2012.

Neil Powell was appointed as headteacher in September 2016 and when Ofsted visited in late 2018 and the report downgraded the school to 'requiring improvement.'

Previously a community school administered by Norfolk County Council, in October 2019 North Walsham High School converted to academy status and is now sponsored by the Enrich Learning Trust.

Since converting to an academy the school has improved dramatically as witnessed by improved exam results that are now higher than the regional and national average. This improvement was rewarded by an improved Ofsted report after a visit in December 2023. The report said:

"Pupils are proud to be members of this flourishing school community."

"At North Walsham High, pupils thrive."

"Since the previous inspection, school leaders and the new trust have made significant improvements to the quality of education. The ambitious curriculum is well designed to meet the needs of all pupils."

"Ongoing training is of a high quality and carefully matched to staff’s needs. This ensures that teachers are able to deliver the curriculum effectively."

"Across the curriculum, pupils achieve very well. However, in key stage three, sometimes teachers are not sufficiently precise in identifying what pupils know or can do. This means some teachers move on before all pupils have understood what is being taught."

== Academics ==
Ofsted described this as a smaller than average secondary school serving rural North Norfolk. The proportion of pupils eligible for the pupil premium is slightly above average. The proportion of pupils with Special educational needs (SEND), including those with an education, health and care plan, is above average.

== The Atrium ==
The Atrium is a £5.3m arts and education centre which opened in September 2011. Facilities at the Atrium include a theatre, cinema, classrooms, exhibition spaces, rooms for meetings, dance studio for various classes, large carpeted areas for workshops and an auditorium that seats 186 people.

The facilities at the Atrium are used primarily by North Walsham High School during the school day, but are open to the wider community of North Walsham and North Norfolk at other times.
