= Knapton =

Village in Norfolk, England

Coordinates: 52.85°N 1.42°E

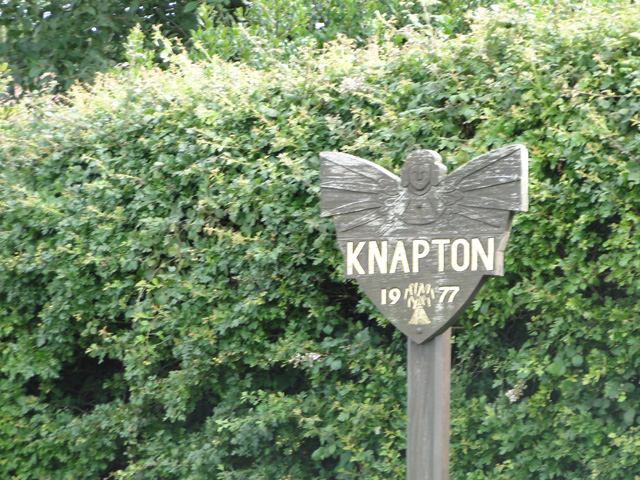
- Knapton village sign

- Location within Norfolk
- Area: 2.24 sq mi (5.8 km^{2})
- Population: 389 (2021 census)
  - Density: 174/sq mi (67/km^{2})
- OS grid reference: TG305340
  - London: 134 miles (216 km)
- Civil parish: Knapton
- District: North Norfolk
- Shire county: Norfolk
- Region: East
- Country: England
- Sovereign state: United Kingdom
- Post town: NORTH WALSHAM
- Postcode district: NR28
- Dialling code: 01263
- Police: Norfolk
- Fire: Norfolk
- Ambulance: East of England
- UK Parliament: North Norfolk
- Website: Parish Council

Knapton is a village and civil parish in the English county of Norfolk. The parish is inland from the coastal village of Mundesley, and is about 9 miles (14 km) south-east of Cromer and 19 miles (31 km) north-east of Norwich, along the B1145.

Besides Knapton village, the only other settlement in the parish is the hamlet of Old Hall Street.

== History ==
Knapton's name is of Anglo-Saxon origin and derives from the Old English for Cnapa's farmstead.

In the Domesday Book, Knapton is listed as a settlement of 32 households in the hundred of North Erpingham. In 1086, the village was part of the East Anglian estates of William de Warenne.

New Hall was built in the village in 1800 and is now a hotel. Knapton House was built around the same period.

In 1943, a Bristol Blenheim crashed in the parish. The crew escaped and one of the propellers has been subsequently recovered.

== Geography ==
At the 2021 census, Knapton had a population of 389 people which shows an increase from the 364 recorded in the 2011 census.

== Church of St. Peter & St. Paul ==
Knapton's parish church is jointly dedicated to Saint Peter and Saint Paul and dates from the 14th century. The church is on 'The Street' and has been Grade I listed since 1955. The church is no longer open for Sunday services and has received several grants from the National Churches Trust.

The church has one of the widest double hammerbeam roofs in England, which is complete with carved angels at the end of the beams. The church was restored in the Victorian era by George Gilbert Scott. There is an ornate font cover in the Palladian style.

=== Church gallery ===
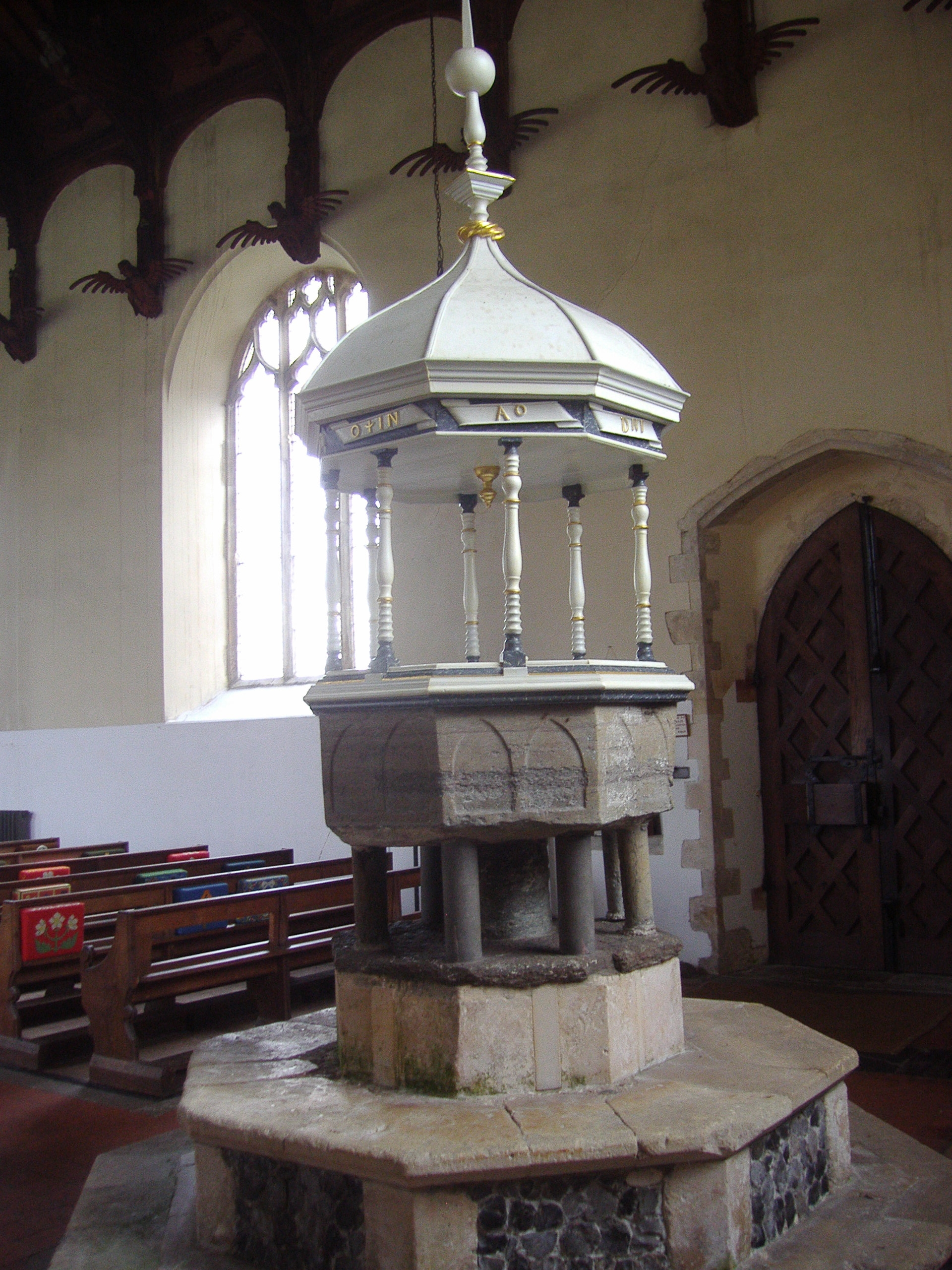
The covered font

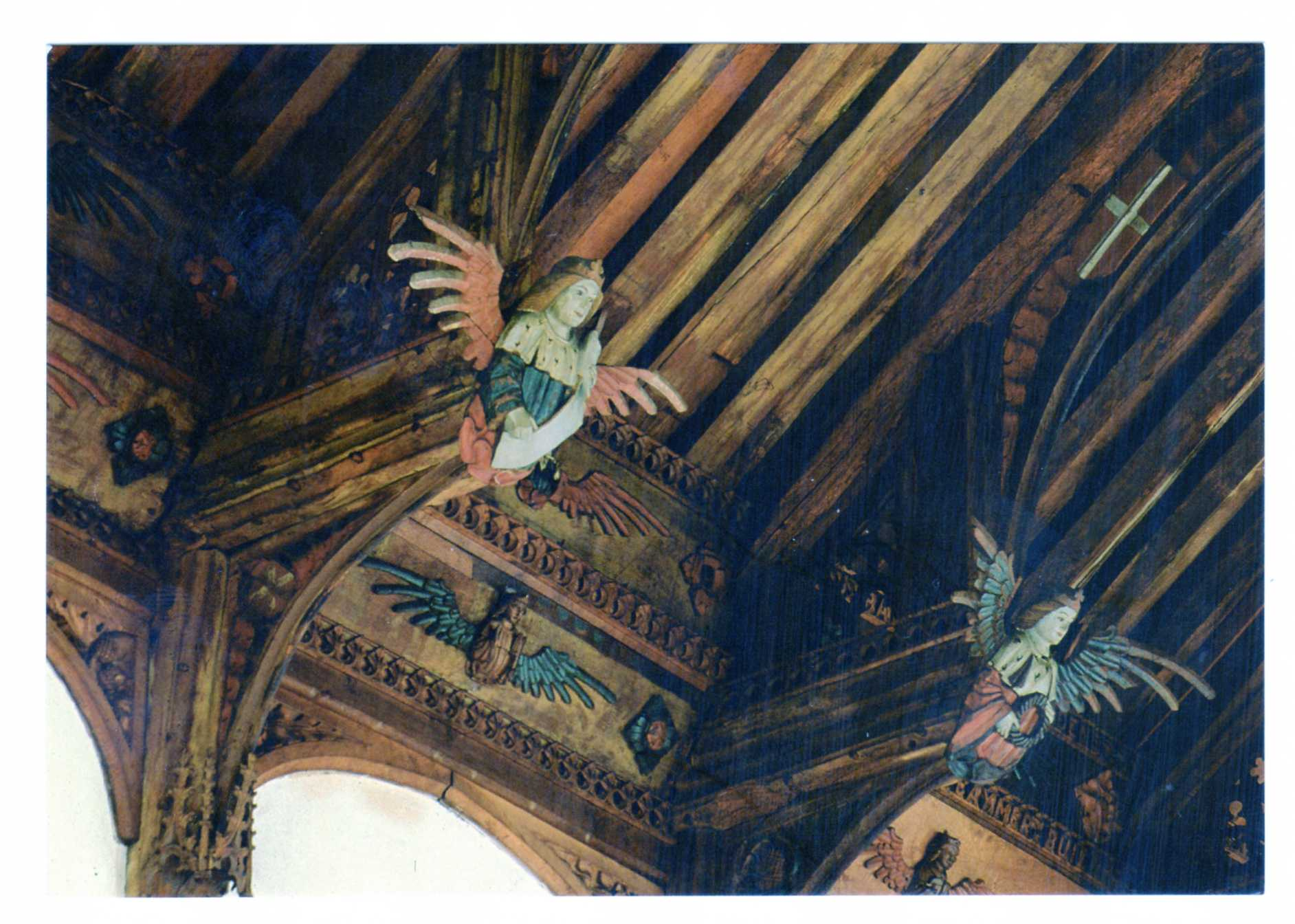
Some of the carved angels

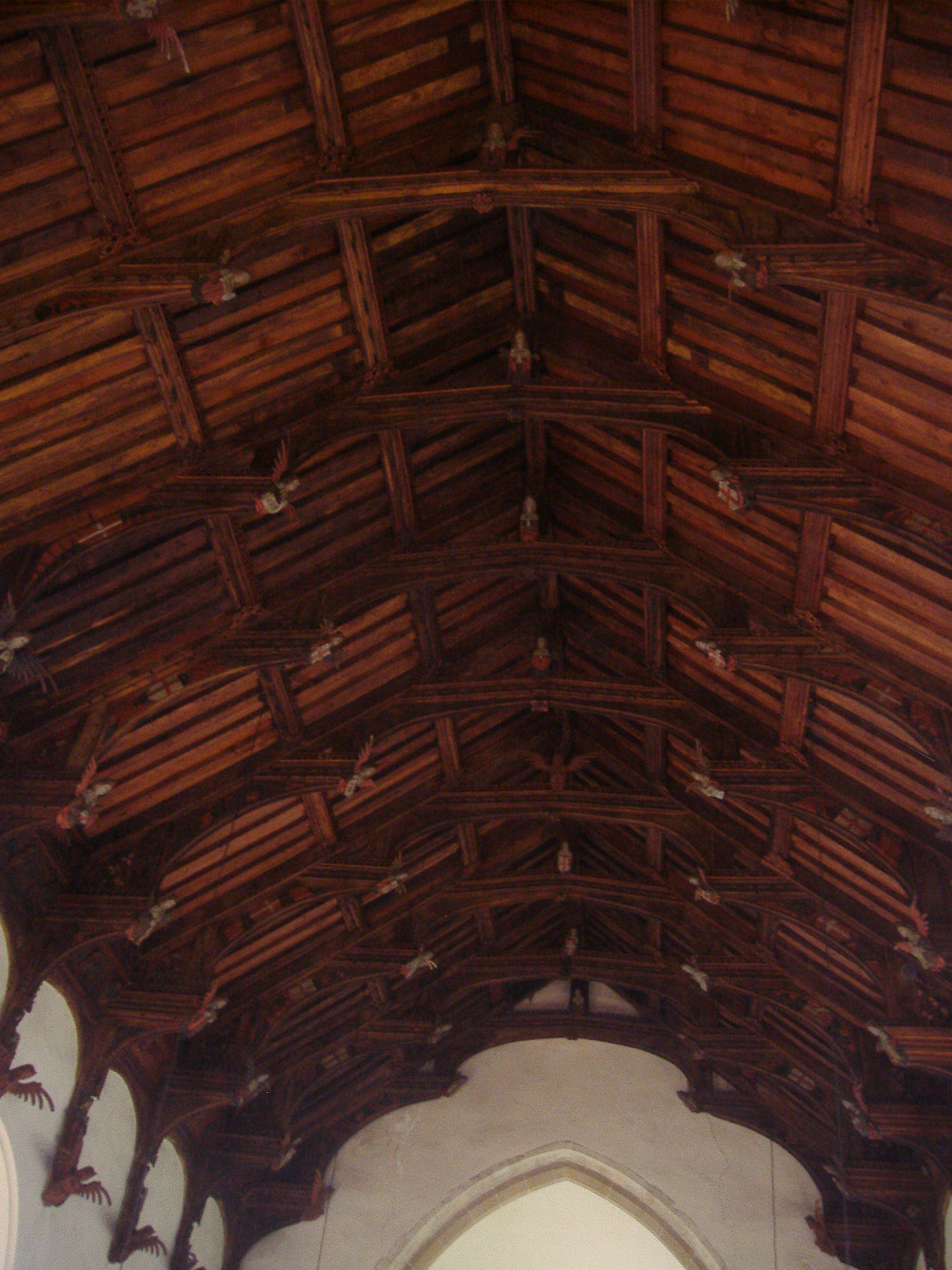
The double hammerbeam roof

== Notable residents ==
- Royal Navy officer Thomas Withers (1769–1843), who served with Horatio Nelson, 1st Viscount Nelson, was born in the village. He is buried a few miles away at St Nicholas Church, North Walsham.
- Walter Pardon (1914–1996), carpenter and traditional folk singer, lived in Knapton.

== Governance ==
Knapton is part of the electoral ward of Trunch for local elections and is part of the district of North Norfolk.

The village's national constituency is North Norfolk, which has been represented by the Liberal Democrat Steff Aquarone MP since 2024.

== War Memorial ==
Knapton War Memorial is a rough-hewn stone cross in the Churchyard of Saint Peter and Saint Paul which lists the following names for the First World War:

Rank	Name	Unit	Date of death	Burial/Commemoration
2Lt.	Douglas Lambert	6th Bn., The Buffs	13 Oct. 1915	Loos Memorial
Sjt.	Tom C. Barcham	7th Bn., Norfolk Regiment	12 Oct. 1916	Thiepval Memorial
Dvr.	Robert C. Yaxley	45th Bty., Royal Field Artillery	1 May 1917	Duisans British Cemetery
Pte.	Albert J. Mace	7th Bn., Lincolnshire Regiment	22 Mar. 1918	Hermies Hill Cemetery
Pte.	Percy W. Swann	1st Bn., Norfolk Regiment	23 Apr. 1917	Arras Memorial
Pte.	George Turner	8th Bn., Norfolk Regt.	19 Jul. 1916	Thiepval Memorial
Pte.	George Wild	7th Bn., Royal Sussex Regiment	9 Aug. 1918	Vis-en-Artois Memorial

The following names were added after the Second World War:

Rank	Name	Unit	Date of death	Burial/Commemoration
FO	Thomas R. R. Wood DFC	No. 115 Sqdn. RAF (Wellington)	3 Jun. 1942	Becklingen War Cemetery
Cpl.	Frederick Watts	Royal Ulster Rifles	14 Jan. 1945	Imphal War Cemetery
Rfn.	Sydney E. Woollsey	7th Bn., King's Royal Rifle Corps	26 May 1940	Les Hemmes Churchyard
