= Listed buildings in North Walsham =

Non-Civil Parish in Norfolk, England

North Walsham is a town and civil parish in the North Norfolk district of Norfolk, England. It contains 104 listed buildings that are recorded in the National Heritage List for England. Of these two are grade I, four are grade II* and 98 are grade II.

This list is based on the information retrieved online from Historic England.

== Key ==
Grade	Criteria
I	Buildings that are of exceptional interest
II*	Particularly important buildings of more than special interest
II	Buildings that are of special interest

== Listing ==
Name	Grade	Location	Type	Completed (Note: The date given is the date used by Historic England as significant for the initial building or that of an important part in the structure's description.)	Date designated	Grid ref. (Note: The grid reference is based on the British national grid reference system, sometimes known as OSGB36, used by the Ordnance Survey.) Geo-coordinates	Notes	Entry number (Note: The "List Entry Number" is a unique number assigned to each listed building and scheduled monument by Historic England.)	Image	Wikidata
The Cedars, 1a and 3 New Road	II	1a and 3 New Road, NR28 9DE			29 September 1972	TG2842230229; 52°49′16″N 1°23′19″E		1039484	Upload Photo	Q26291278
6 Market Street	II	6 Market Street, NR28 9BZ			21 June 1950	TG2823030299; 52°49′19″N 1°23′09″E		1039524	Upload Photo	Q26291321
20-22 Market Street	II	20-22 Market Street, NR28 9BZ			3 April 2025	TG2816830307; 52°49′19″N 1°23′06″E		1487260	Upload Photo	Q136386076
26, 27 and 27a Market Place	II	26, 27 and 27a Market Place, NR28 9BS			29 September 1972	TG2821330260; 52°49′18″N 1°23′08″E		1373969	Upload Photo	Q26654884
31 Market Place	II	31 Market Place, NR28 9BP			29 September 1972	TG2824730255; 52°49′17″N 1°23′10″E		1039516	Upload Photo	Q26291313
33, 34 and 35a Market Place	II	33, 34 and 35a Market Place, NR28 9BT			29 September 1972	TG2827130250; 52°49′17″N 1°23′11″E		1281160	Upload Photo	Q26570231
Bank House and 2-4 King's Arms Street	II	NR28 9JX			25 April 2024	TG2820730221; 52°49′16″N 1°23′08″E		1487215	Upload Photo	Q126688938
Church of St Nicholas	I		church building		21 June 1950	TG2833330272; 52°49′18″N 1°23′15″E		1039527	Church of St Nicholas More images	Q7594951
Market Cross	I	NR28 9BT	market cross		21 June 1950	TG2824530242; 52°49′17″N 1°23′10″E		1281216	Market Cross More images	Q17537008
Walls of Churchyard of Church of St Nicholas	II				29 September 1972	TG2837230289; 52°49′18″N 1°23′17″E		1039528	Upload Photo	Q26291325
Road Bridge Over North Walsham and Dilham Canal	II	Anchor Road			29 September 1972	TG2994230600; 52°49′26″N 1°24′41″E		1039529	Upload Photo	Q26291326
14, Aylsham Road	II*	14, Aylsham Road			21 June 1950	TG2806230255; 52°49′18″N 1°23′00″E		1039533	Upload Photo	Q17555700
Ivy Cottage	II*	15, Aylsham Road			29 September 1972	TG2810630242; 52°49′17″N 1°23′02″E		1039530	Upload Photo	Q17555695
Bradmoor Farmhouse	II	Aylsham Road			29 September 1972	TG2677630278; 52°49′20″N 1°21′52″E		1373939	Upload Photo	Q26654853
Garden Walls of Number 15	II	Aylsham Road			29 September 1972	TG2808630192; 52°49′15″N 1°23′01″E		1039532	Upload Photo	Q26291328
Outbuilding South of Number 15	II	Aylsham Road			29 September 1972	TG2810130211; 52°49′16″N 1°23′02″E		1039531	Upload Photo	Q26291327
Two Barns to East of Bradmoor Farmhouse	II	Aylsham Road			29 September 1972	TG2681030268; 52°49′20″N 1°21′53″E		1039534	Upload Photo	Q26291329
3 and 5, Bacton Road	II	3 and 5, Bacton Road			29 September 1972	TG2841330354; 52°49′20″N 1°23′19″E		1039535	Upload Photo	Q26291330
7 and 9, Bacton Road	II	7 and 9, Bacton Road			29 September 1972	TG2841930362; 52°49′20″N 1°23′19″E		1373940	Upload Photo	Q26654854
Lyngate House	II	Bacton Road			29 September 1972	TG2883230973; 52°49′40″N 1°23′43″E		1039536	Upload Photo	Q26291331
Bradfield Bridge	II	Bradfield Road			29 September 1972	TG2738332009; 52°50′15″N 1°22′28″E		1204308	Upload Photo	Q26499768
2 Church Street	II	2, Church Street, NR28 9DA			29 September 1972	TG2840330226; 52°49′16″N 1°23′18″E		1373941	Upload Photo	Q26654855
4, Church Street	II	4, Church Street			29 September 1972	TG2840430242; 52°49′17″N 1°23′18″E		1039537	Upload Photo	Q26291333
6 Church Street	II	6, Church Street, NR28 9DA			29 September 1972	TG2839830255; 52°49′17″N 1°23′18″E		1204314	Upload Photo	Q26499774
8, Church Street	II	8, Church Street			29 September 1972	TG2840230261; 52°49′17″N 1°23′18″E		1039538	Upload Photo	Q26291334
10 Church Street	II	10, Church Street, NR28 9DA			29 September 1972	TG2840830267; 52°49′17″N 1°23′19″E		1373942	Upload Photo	Q26654856
The White Swan	II	12, Church Street, NR28 9DA	pub		29 September 1972	TG2841230273; 52°49′18″N 1°23′19″E		1204354	The White Swan More images	Q26499811
14, Church Street	II	14, Church Street			29 September 1972	TG2841330278; 52°49′18″N 1°23′19″E		1039539	Upload Photo	Q26291335
1a, 1b and 1c, Church Street	II	1a, 1b and 1c, Church Street			29 September 1972	TG2840130313; 52°49′19″N 1°23′18″E		1204356	Upload Photo	Q26499813
K6 Telephone Kiosk	II	Church Street			10 July 1989	TG2839830300; 52°49′19″N 1°23′18″E		1373959	Upload Photo	Q26654874
The Hollies	II	25, Cromer Road			29 September 1972	TG2789530378; 52°49′22″N 1°22′52″E		1373943	Upload Photo	Q26654858
Paston College	II	Grammar School Road, NR28 9JL			21 June 1950	TG2826630134; 52°49′13″N 1°23′11″E		1039540	Upload Photo	Q26291336
Garden Cottage	II	Holgate Road			29 September 1972	TG3005429386; 52°48′46″N 1°24′44″E		1373944	Upload Photo	Q26654859
7, King's Arms Street	II	7, King's Arms Street			29 September 1972	TG2822230158; 52°49′14″N 1°23′08″E		1039542	Upload Photo	Q26291338
15, King's Arms Street	II	15, King's Arms Street			29 September 1972	TG2821830105; 52°49′12″N 1°23′08″E		1204393	Upload Photo	Q26499842
30-34 King's Arms Street	II	30-34, King's Arms Street			29 September 1972	TG2820130113; 52°49′13″N 1°23′07″E		1039543	Upload Photo	Q26291339
King's Arms Hotel	II	King's Arms Street	hotel		29 September 1972	TG2823030216; 52°49′16″N 1°23′09″E		1204383	King's Arms Hotel More images	Q26499833
Church of the Sacred Heart	II	Kings Arms Street	church building		16 April 2003	TG2818930047; 52°49′11″N 1°23′06″E		1096061	Church of the Sacred Heart More images	Q26388355
3 King's Arms Street	II	3, King’s Arms Street, NR28 9JX			29 September 1972	TG2822430168; 52°49′15″N 1°23′09″E		1039541	Upload Photo	Q26291337
22 and 24 King's Arms Street	II	22 and 24, King’s Arms Street, NR28 9JX			29 September 1972	TG2820030140; 52°49′14″N 1°23′07″E		1373945	Upload Photo	Q26654860
Two First World War Pillboxes to the North and South of Bacton Road, Little London	II	Little London, Nr28			9 July 2025	TG2963531336; 52°49′50″N 1°24′27″E		1493292	Upload Photo	Q136386152
1 Market Place	II	1, Market Place, NR28 9BP			29 September 1972	TG2839230218; 52°49′16″N 1°23′18″E		1373946	Upload Photo	Q26654861
2, Market Place	II	2, Market Place, NR28 9BP			29 September 1972	TG2838230218; 52°49′16″N 1°23′17″E		1039504	Upload Photo	Q26291299
3 Market Place	II	3, Market Place, NR28 9BP			29 September 1972	TG2837730218; 52°49′16″N 1°23′17″E		1039505	Upload Photo	Q26291300
4 Market Place	II	4, Market Place, NR28 9BP			29 September 1972	TG2836430224; 52°49′16″N 1°23′16″E		1039506	Upload Photo	Q26291302
7, Market Place	II*	7, Market Place			29 September 1972	TG2833430214; 52°49′16″N 1°23′15″E		1039507	Upload Photo	Q26291303
8-10 Market Place	II	8-10, Market Place, NR28 9BP			29 September 1972	TG2832330216; 52°49′16″N 1°23′14″E		1039508	Upload Photo	Q26291304
11, Market Place	II	11, Market Place, NR28 9BP			29 September 1972	TG2831630206; 52°49′16″N 1°23′14″E		1039509	Upload Photo	Q26291305
13 and 14 Market Place	II	13 and 14, Market Place, NR28 9BP			29 September 1972	TG2829230208; 52°49′16″N 1°23′12″E		1039510	Upload Photo	Q26291306
15, Market Place	II	15, Market Place, NR28 9BP			29 September 1972	TG2828430216; 52°49′16″N 1°23′12″E		1039511	Upload Photo	Q26291307
16, Market Place	II	16, Market Place			29 September 1972	TG2828230228; 52°49′16″N 1°23′12″E		1039512	Upload Photo	Q26291308
17-19, Market Place	II	17-19, Market Place			29 September 1972	TG2826730224; 52°49′16″N 1°23′11″E		1373967	Upload Photo	Q26654882
20, Market Place	II	20, Market Place, NR28 9BP			29 September 1972	TG2825630224; 52°49′16″N 1°23′10″E		1039513	Upload Photo	Q26291309
21 and 22 Market Place	II	21 and 22, Market Place, NR28 9BP			29 September 1972	TG2824230226; 52°49′16″N 1°23′10″E		1373968	Upload Photo	Q26654883
23 and 24, Market Place	II	23 and 24, Market Place, NR28 9BS			29 September 1972	TG2821630231; 52°49′17″N 1°23′08″E		1039514	Upload Photo	Q26291310
25 Market Place	II	25, Market Place, NR28 9BS			29 September 1972	TG2820930250; 52°49′17″N 1°23′08″E		1204461	Upload Photo	Q26499903
28, 28b and 28c, Market Place	II	28, 28b and 28c, Market Place, NR28 9BS			29 September 1972	TG2823730267; 52°49′18″N 1°23′09″E		1039515	Upload Photo	Q26291311
30 Market Place	II	30, Market Place, NR28 9BS			29 September 1972	TG2824230259; 52°49′17″N 1°23′10″E		1204524	Upload Photo	Q26499964
32 Market Place	II	32, Market Place, NR28 9BT			29 September 1972	TG2825430254; 52°49′17″N 1°23′10″E		1373970	Upload Photo	Q26654885
The Grosvenor Restaurant	II	35, Market Place			29 September 1972	TG2829030248; 52°49′17″N 1°23′12″E		1039517	Upload Photo	Q26291314
38 Market Place	II	38, Market Place, NR28 9BT			29 September 1972	TG2829430247; 52°49′17″N 1°23′12″E		1281163	Upload Photo	Q26570234
39 Market Place	II	39, Market Place, NR28 9BT			29 September 1972	TG2829930246; 52°49′17″N 1°23′13″E		1373932	Upload Photo	Q26654846
40, Market Place	II	40, Market Place			29 September 1972	TG2830530245; 52°49′17″N 1°23′13″E		1039518	Upload Photo	Q26291315
41 Market Place	II	41, Market Place			29 September 1972	TG2831530243; 52°49′17″N 1°23′14″E		1204533	Upload Photo	Q26499970
42, Market Place	II	42, Market Place			29 September 1972	TG2832530241; 52°49′17″N 1°23′14″E		1039519	Upload Photo	Q26291316
43 Market Place	II	43, Market Place, NR28 9BT			29 September 1972	TG2833230241; 52°49′17″N 1°23′14″E		1281166	Upload Photo	Q26570237
44 Market Place	II	44, Market Place, NR28 9BT			29 September 1972	TG2833730240; 52°49′17″N 1°23′15″E		1373933	Upload Photo	Q26654847
45, Market Place	II	45, Market Place			29 September 1972	TG2834330239; 52°49′17″N 1°23′15″E		1039520	Upload Photo	Q26291317
46 and 47 Market Place	II	46 and 47, Market Place, NR28 9BT			29 September 1972	TG2835230239; 52°49′17″N 1°23′16″E		1204559	Upload Photo	Q26499991
48 and 49 Market Place	II	48 and 49, Market Place, NR28 9BT			29 September 1972	TG2836030239; 52°49′17″N 1°23′16″E		1373934	Upload Photo	Q26654848
50, Market Place	II	50, Market Place			29 September 1972	TG2837330237; 52°49′17″N 1°23′17″E		1039521	Upload Photo	Q26291318
Wall and Door at North Entrance of Paston Sixth Form College	II	Market Place			29 September 1972	TG2826030214; 52°49′16″N 1°23′11″E		1281242	Upload Photo	Q26570306
Feathers Inn	II	1, Market Street	pub		29 September 1972	TG2820530264; 52°49′18″N 1°23′08″E		1204571	Feathers Inn More images	Q26500002
2 Market Street	II	2, Market Street, NR28 9BZ			29 September 1972	TG2823030271; 52°49′18″N 1°23′09″E		1373936	Upload Photo	Q26654850
3 Market Street	II	3, Market Street, NR28 9BZ			29 September 1972	TG2819430270; 52°49′18″N 1°23′07″E		1373935	Upload Photo	Q26654849
5 Market Street	II	5, Market Street, NR28 9BZ			29 September 1972	TG2818830274; 52°49′18″N 1°23′07″E		1204581	Upload Photo	Q26500012
7 and 9, Market Street	II	7 and 9, Market Street			29 September 1972	TG2817830269; 52°49′18″N 1°23′06″E		1039522	Upload Photo	Q26291319
8 Market Street	II	8, Market Street, NR28 9BZ			29 September 1972	TG2821630296; 52°49′19″N 1°23′08″E		1373937	Upload Photo	Q26654851
10 and 12, Market Street	II	10 and 12, Market Street			29 September 1972	TG2821130295; 52°49′19″N 1°23′08″E		1204645	Upload Photo	Q26500067
14, Market Street	II	14, Market Street			29 September 1972	TG2819430296; 52°49′19″N 1°23′07″E		1039525	Upload Photo	Q26291323
North Norfolk Labour Party	II	16, Market Street			29 September 1972	TG2818830294; 52°49′19″N 1°23′07″E		1039526	Upload Photo	Q26291324
18 and 18a Market Street	II	18 and 18a, Market Street, NR28 9BZ			29 September 1972	TG2817730297; 52°49′19″N 1°23′06″E		1281105	Upload Photo	Q26570179
Former Girls High School	II	Market Street			29 September 1972	TG2816130273; 52°49′18″N 1°23′05″E		1039523	Upload Photo	Q26291320
Front Wall of Former Girl's High School	II	Market Street, NR28 9BZ			29 September 1972	TG2816930288; 52°49′18″N 1°23′06″E		1281129	Upload Photo	Q26570200
1 Mundesley Road	II	1, Mundesley Road, NR28 0DA			29 September 1972	TG2815030312; 52°49′19″N 1°23′05″E		1373938	Upload Photo	Q26654852
North Walsham Quaker Meeting House	II*	Mundesley Road, Swafield, NR28 0RF	Quaker meeting house		21 June 1950	TG2851731732; 52°50′05″N 1°23′28″E		1373956	North Walsham Quaker Meeting House More images	Q17556951
The Thatched Cottage	II	Mundesley Road			29 September 1972	TG2858531677; 52°50′03″N 1°23′32″E		1039482	Upload Photo	Q26291276
1 New Road	II	1, New Road, NR28 9DE			29 September 1972	TG2840330228; 52°49′16″N 1°23′18″E		1039483	Upload Photo	Q26291277
9, New Road	II	9, New Road			29 September 1972	TG2847630216; 52°49′16″N 1°23′22″E		1039487	Upload Photo	Q26291282
1 and 3, North Street	II	1 and 3, North Street			29 September 1972	TG2833330433; 52°49′23″N 1°23′15″E		1281085	Upload Photo	Q26570161
Empsom House	II	North Street			29 September 1972	TG2834730431; 52°49′23″N 1°23′16″E		1039488	Upload Photo	Q26291283
Cross	II	Norwich Road			21 June 1950	TG2783928287; 52°48′14″N 1°22′43″E		1039489	Upload Photo	Q17673778
Monument Cottage	II	Norwich Road			29 September 1972	TG2782428333; 52°48′16″N 1°22′43″E		1204688	Upload Photo	Q26500107
Stump Cross	II	Norwich Road			29 September 1972	TG2785929257; 52°48′46″N 1°22′47″E		1281090	Upload Photo	Q17673762
Thatched Cottage	II	Norwich Road			29 September 1972	TG2767128079; 52°48′08″N 1°22′34″E		1373957	Upload Photo	Q26654871
2 Park Lane	II	2, Park Lane, NR28 9JZ			29 September 1972	TG2820330104; 52°49′12″N 1°23′07″E		1039490	Upload Photo	Q26291285
34 Vicarage Street	II	34, Vicarage Street, NR28 9DQ			29 September 1972	TG2836130324; 52°49′19″N 1°23′16″E		1281056	Upload Photo	Q26570135
36 Vicarage Street	II	36, Vicarage Street, NR28 9DQ			29 September 1972	TG2837930319; 52°49′19″N 1°23′17″E		1373958	Upload Photo	Q26654872
38, Vicarage Street	II	38, Vicarage Street			29 September 1972	TG2839530318; 52°49′19″N 1°23′18″E		1039492	Upload Photo	Q26291287
Melbourne House	II	Walsham Chalet Park			29 September 1972	TG2929731033; 52°49′41″N 1°24′08″E		1281060	Upload Photo	Q26570139
Two First World War Pillboxes to the North and South of Happisburgh Road, White Horse Common	II	White Horse Common, Nr28			8 July 2025	TG3082429620; 52°48′53″N 1°25′26″E		1493294	Upload Photo	Q136386153
Home Farmhouse	II	White Horse Road			29 September 1972	TG3040629154; 52°48′38″N 1°25′02″E		1281064	Upload Photo	Q26570143
Warwick House	II	2, Yarmouth Road, NR28 9BW			29 September 1972	TG2838930213; 52°49′16″N 1°23′17″E		1039493	Upload Photo	Q26291288
Mill Cottages	II	53-57, Yarmouth Road			29 September 1972	TG2857329467; 52°48′51″N 1°23′25″E		1039494	Upload Photo	Q26291289

== See also ==
- Grade I listed buildings in Norfolk
- Grade II* listed buildings in Norfolk

== Sources ==
- Wilson, Bill; Pevsner, Nikolaus (1999) [1962], Norfolk 2: North-West and South, The Buildings of England, New Haven and London: Yale University Press, ISBN 978-0-300-09657-6
