= Swafield =

Village in Norfolk, England

Coordinates: 52.83878°N 1.39432°E

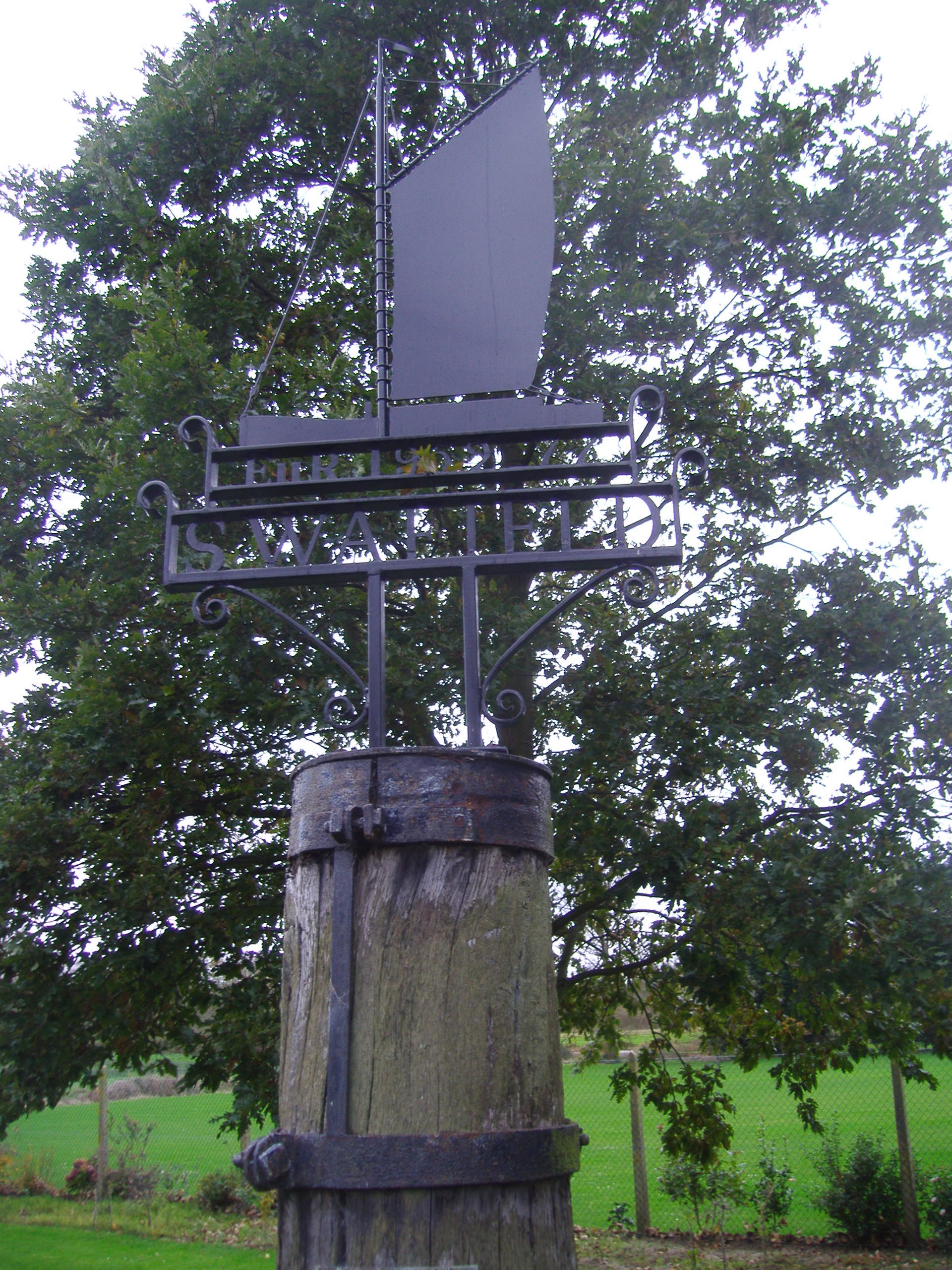
- The Village sign

- Location within Norfolk
- Area: 6.43 km^{2} (2.48 sq mi)
- Population: 315 (parish, 2011 census)
  - Density: 49/km^{2} (130/sq mi)
- OS grid reference: TG2832
  - London: 132 miles (212 km)
- Civil parish: Swafield
- District: North Norfolk
- Shire county: Norfolk
- Region: East
- Country: England
- Sovereign state: United Kingdom
- Post town: NORTH WALSHAM
- Postcode district: NR28
- Police: Norfolk
- Fire: Norfolk
- Ambulance: East of England
- UK Parliament: North Norfolk

Swafield is a village and civil parish in the North Norfolk district of the county of Norfolk, England. The village is 16 miles (26 km) north north east of Norwich, 10 miles (16 km) south south east of Cromer and 1 mile (1.6 km) north of the town of North Walsham. The village sits astride the B1145 Kings Lynn to Mundesley road that bisects North Norfolk west to east. The nearest railway station is at North Walsham for the Bittern Line which runs between Sheringham and Norwich. The nearest airport is Norwich International Airport. The parish had in 2001 census, a population of 273, including Bradfield and increasing to 315 at the 2011 Census.

== Origins ==
The name Swafield possibly originates from open land with a track from the Anglo Saxon words swæth, meaning track, and feld, meaning field, often a forest clearing. The former is the origin of swath or swathe, the latter of field. The name may also mean therefore, open land with swathes, the latter being areas of cut, laying corn.

== History ==
Swafield has an entry in the Domesday Book of 1085. In the great book Swafield is recorded by the name Suafelda, Suaffelda and Suauelda, the main landholders being Bishop William and William d'Ecouis with the main tenant being Ranulf brother of Ilger. The survey also mentions a church.

In 1995, South African-British Judge Johan Steyn, Baron Steyn, PC, was created a life peer of Swafield in the County of Norfolk, as part of his appointment to the House of Lords as a Lord of Appeal in Ordinary.

=== The North Walsham and Dilham Canal ===
The North Walsham and Dilham Canal, which is the only canal in Norfolk, was constructed and opened in 1826, and is 8.7 miles long and runs from Swafield Bridge to a junction with the River Ant at Smallburgh. The canal was constructed with locks a little wider than most canals in the UK to accommodate the use of the Norfolk wherries, hence the image of a wherry on Swafield's village sign.

== The parish church of Saint Nicholas ==
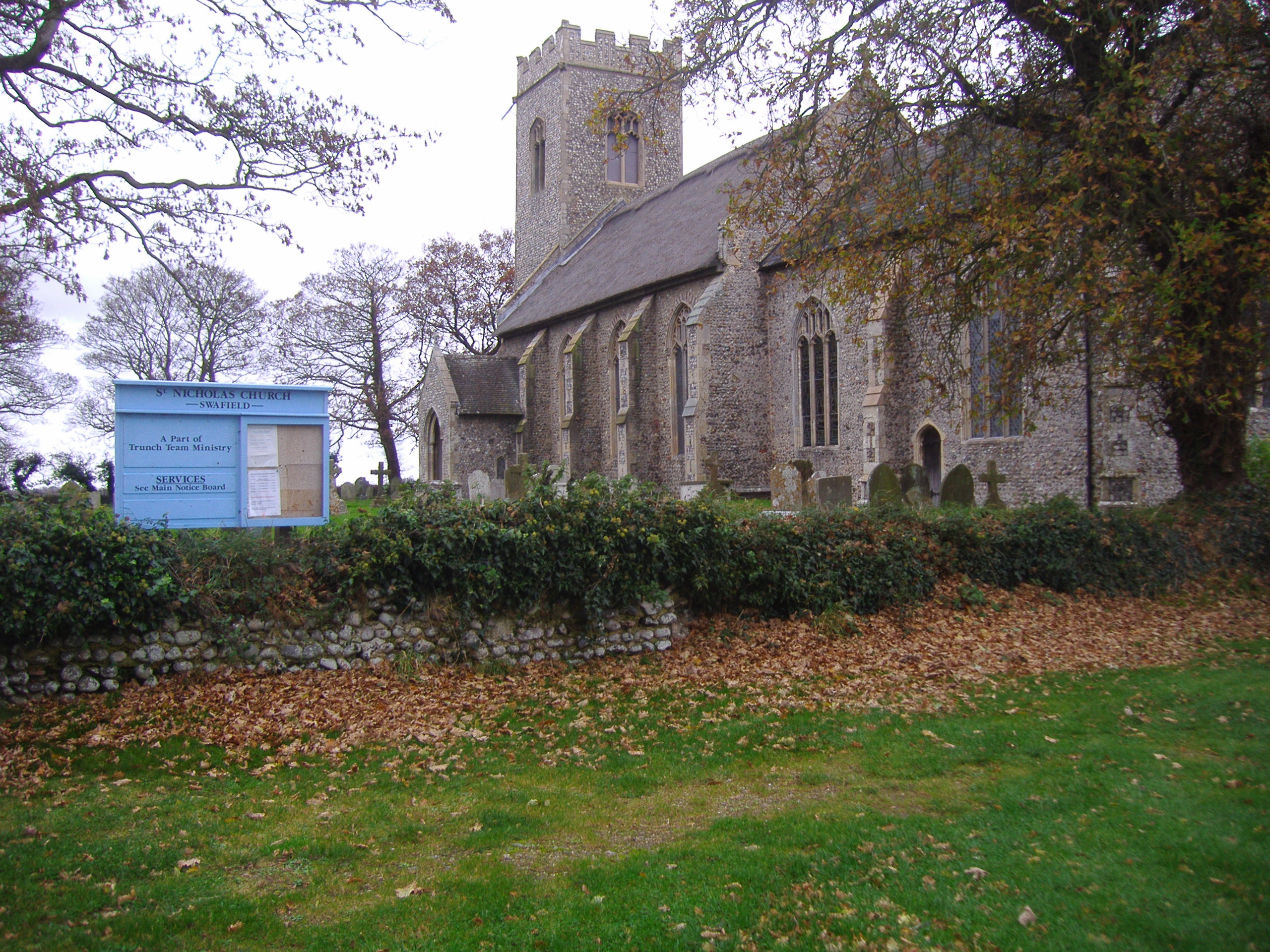
Saint Nicholas Parish Church

The parish church of Saint Nicholas stands in a commanding position on high ground north of the village. the church is built in the perpendicular style with large windows and dates from the late 15th century although the tower is from the 14th century and the nave has a thatched roof. Inside the church the base of the chancel screen can still be seen. the base is painted red green and gold and was decorated by a 15th-century artist. Roses and leaves have been carved in the tracery of the panels, on which there are paintings of the eight apostles. The interior of the roof is decorated bosses. Some of them feature Tudor roses, another a lion, but others have faces on them. One face is of Christ, with the five pointed beard. Another face is surrounded by a crown of thorns, in the rope style of the 15th century. A third face is surrounded by sun rays and represents Christ in glory. Displayed on the north wall there is a little crucifix. It was found in separate pieces over several days in March 1937 on the beach at Walcott, after storms had eroded the cliffs there. Each piece was thickly caked with clay. It is believed the crucifix had been buried purposely and may have been hidden at the time of the Reformation by locals, before the Anglican reformers came and stole it from them, although this is only local folklore with no provenance to prove this case.

Located in Trunch Road, the church is Grade II* listed.
