= Joseph Xu Honggen =

Chinese Catholic priest and Bishop

- Bishop of the Roman Catholic Diocese of Suzhou
- Church: Cathedral of Our Lady of Seven Sorrows, Suzhou
- Province: Jiangsu
- Diocese: Roman Catholic Diocese of Suzhou
- Installed: 2005
- Predecessor: Ignatius Kung Pin-Mei

Orders
- Ordination: 1990

Personal details
- Born: April 1962 (age 64) Suzhou, Jiangsu, China
- Denomination: Roman Catholic
- Education: Sheshan Seminary; St. Joseph's College; Catholic Theological Union
- Coat of arms

Chinese name
- Chinese: 徐宏根
Transcriptions
Standard Mandarin
- Hanyu Pinyin: Xú Hónggēn

Joseph Xu Honggen (Chinese: 徐宏根; born April 1962) is a Chinese Catholic priest and Bishop of the Roman Catholic Diocese of Suzhou since 2005.

== Biography ==
Xu was born in Suzhou, Jiangsu, in April 1962, to a Catholic family. He graduated from Sheshan Seminary. After college, he was assigned to the Roman Catholic Diocese of Suzhou. Two years later, he went to the United States, where he studied at the St. Joseph's College and Catholic Theological Union. He was ordained a priest in 1990 by bishop Matthias Ma Longlin (Chinese: 马龙麟).

Xu returned to China in June 1999 and that same year became Bishop of the Roman Catholic Diocese of Suzhou, which was approved by the Pope Benedict XVI. In October 2016, he was received by the Pope Francis.

Catholic Church titles
| Previous: Ignatius Kung Pin-Mei | Bishop of the Roman Catholic Diocese of Suzhou; 2005 | Incumbent |
