= St Nicholas Church, North Walsham =

Church building in Norfolk, England

Coordinates: 52.8216°N 1.3874°E

St Nicholas
- St Nicholas Church, North Walsham
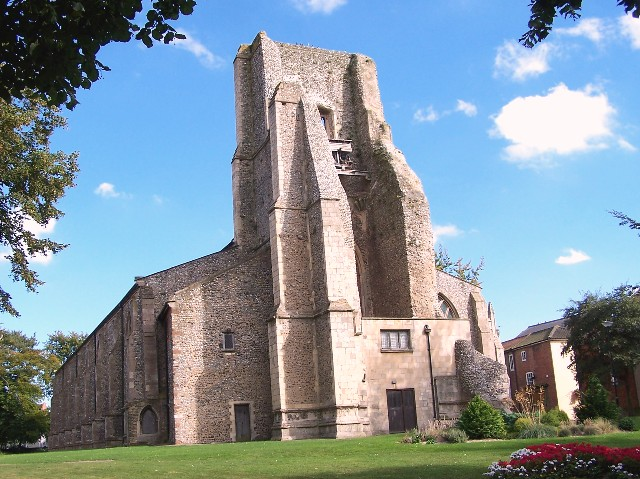

- Location within Norfolk
- Location: North Walsham, Norfolk
- Country: England
- Denomination: Church of England

History
- Status: Parish church

Architecture
- Functional status: Active
- Heritage designation: Grade I listed
- Designated: 21 June 1950

Administration
- Province: Canterbury
- Diocese: Norwich
- Deanery: St Benet at Waxham & Tunstead
- Parish: North Walsham

St Nicholas Church is a parish church in the Church of England in the centre of the Norfolk town of North Walsham. The building is one of the largest parish churches in the UK. The ruinous tower is a local landmark and stands to a height of 85 feet (26 m). The tower collapsed in May 1724. The entrance porch is richly carved and decorated with colourful statues and heraldic emblems. Other features include a telescopic baptismal font cover, and remains of a highly decorated parclose screen with an array of painted saints.

The construction of the present church began in about 1330, with work being interrupted in 1348 and once more in 1361. The completed church was consecrated by Henry le Despenser, the Bishop of Norwich, at the end of the 14th century.

== History ==
=== Foundation to the Reformation ===
The Domesday Book records a church at Walsam, and that the church owned 30 acres (12 ha) of land. There are remains of the original pre-Conquest tower at the west end of the church's north aisle.

The present church was commenced in about 1330, although the Saxon church was partially enlarged and altered in around 1275, as a temporary measure to meet the needs of a rapidly expanding town. Work was interrupted by the 'Black Death' plague in 1348 and again in 1361. These fatal epidemics resulted in a lack of skilled craftsmen, a fact which necessitated the austere simple tracery in most of the windows. There was another delay at the time of the Peasants' Revolt in 1381, following the Battle of North Walsham, when a large group of rebellious local peasants was confronted and defeated by the heavily armed forces led by the warlike bishop of Norwich, Henry le Despenser. The completed church was consecrated by le Despenser by the end of the fourteenth century.

The church was dedicated to the Blessed Virgin Mary, the change to St. Nicholas only happening in later years after the English Reformation.

=== Post-Reformation ===
The ruinous tower is a local landmark and stands to a height of 85 feet. It was one of Norfolk's tallest, and attained a height of 147 feet to the parapet, with a lead-covered timber spire. According to local folklore, a spire—which increased the height of the church to 180 feet (55 m)—was added as an act of local rivalry after the completion of the 158-feet tower at Cromer. The tower was built at a later date than the rest of the church, and had six bells and a clock.

The tower collapsed on the morning of Saturday 16 May 1724 between 9 and 10 o'clock when the entire south-west corner of the structure containing the stairwell failed. The distressed state of the building had been noticed by the Sexton the previous evening when he ascended the tower to wind the clock. That day had seen the bells rung for several hours during the Ascensiontide Fair, which seems to have caused a resonance throughout the structure.

The Vicar Thomas Jeffery noted the catastrophe in the parish register: "Memorandum May 16. Between nine and ten o'clock in the forenoon on the Sat. fell down the north and south sides of the steeple and no person man woman nor child 'yt we hear of yet getting any mischief thereby. Thanks to be to God for his goodness therein."

Once open to the elements the building deteriorated further. At 6pm on Wednesday 17 February 1836 heavy gales brought down the north side of the ruin, sending a quake like tremor through the town. The remaining east belfry wall was dismantled during the year to a reduced height. One large silence chamber window with its distinctive reticulated tracery remains in situ.

The tower has never been rebuilt since the remains were reduced by 50 feet (15 m) in 1836.

According to Francis Blomefield, an 18th-century English antiquarian who wrote a county history of Norfolk:

The Church is dedicated to St. Nicholas, and was always in the patronage of St. Bennet's abbey of Holm. In the reign of Edward I, this rectory was valued at 62 marks. Peter-pence 18d. and the rector had a manse with 40 acres of land. The church is large, has a nave with 2 aisles, and a chancel covered with lead; the tower is down; but there are three bells in the lower part of the church.

— Francis Blomefield, An Essay Towards a Topographical History of the County of Norfolk (1805)

The east window was destroyed during a storm in 1809. It had tracery of a similar simple design to those of the majority of the aisle windows, and showed the arms of the diocese of Norwich impaling those of Edmund Freke, Bishop of Norwich (1575–1584). The present stained glass is a 1920s war memorial. The interior of the church was restored between 1870 and 1890 at a cost of £9,000. The church porch was restored in 1955. In February 2015, urgent work to make the tower safe, at a cost of £210,000, was completed.

== Description ==
St Nicholas Church is located in the centre of North Walsham close to the marketplace, and surrounded by narrow streets.

The building is about 160 feet (49 m) long internally, and approx. 200 feet (61 m) overall when the ruined tower is included. The body of the church has a mixture of Decorated Gothic and Perpendicular styles. The building has seven bays running along its length. It lacks an arch to the entrance of the chancel. In the west wall of the north aisle is a lancet window. Most of the aisle windows have restored intersecting tracery. The main entrance doorway and the chancel are Decorated. The east window and east aisle windows were restored in 1874, and the 500-year-old medieval roof was replaced between 1875 and 1881.

The pinnacled entrance porch is richly carved and decorated with colourful statues and heraldic emblems. During the medieval period the south chapel area of the church contained a shrine to Thomas Becket, popular with pilgrims en route to Bromholm Priory at Bacton. The porch is described by the architectural historian Nikolaus Pevsner as "a showpiece of the late 14th century". The date is confirmed by the emblems of Edward III and John of Gaunt.

The building is one of Britain's largest parish churches. The original size of the tower (147 feet (45 m)) meant that it was one of the tallest churches in Norfolk.

The church’s two piscinae were used for rinsing the sacred vessels after the Eucharist On the north side of the south chapel an arch may be seen behind the sedilia. Its function is unknown, but it may have been designed to increase the light level, or to permit an unconfirmed or excommunicated person could watch a church service.

== Furnishings and fixtures ==
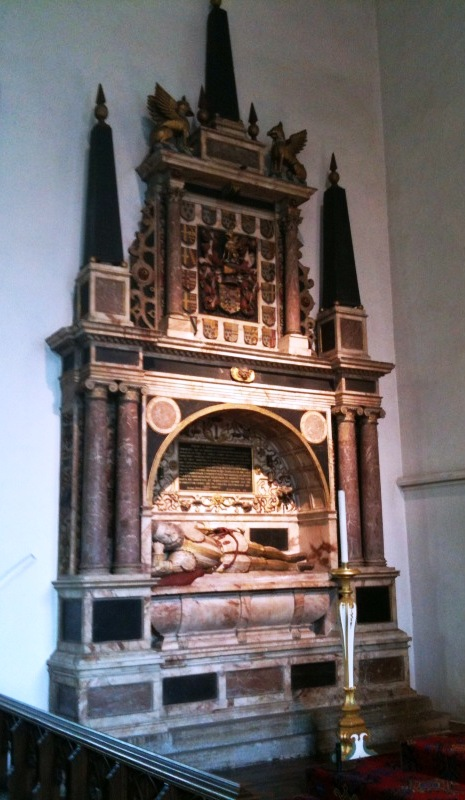
The ornate tomb of Sir William Paston

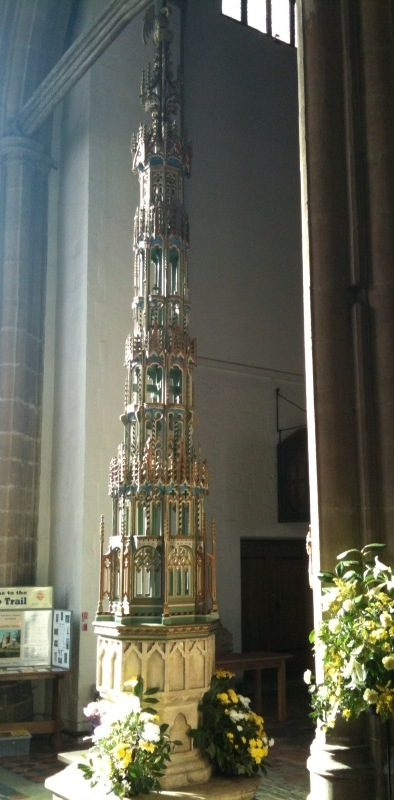
The 15th-century font cover

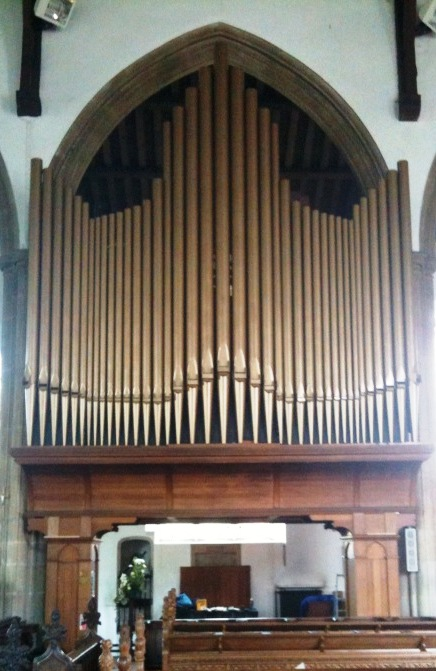
The organ

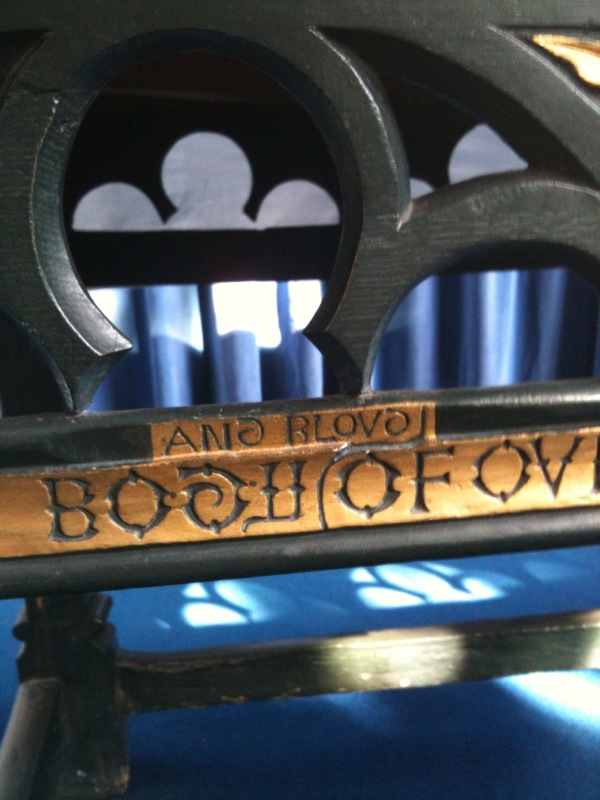
A detail of the 1539 altar

St Nicholas contains many unusual features and artifacts. These include medieval misericord seats, the remains of a highly decorated parclose screen with an array of painted saints, and a unique Communion Table. An inscription along the front of the table quotes the first Book of Common Prayer (1549) introduced by King Edward VI; it allows the table to be dated from between 1549 and 1552.

The screen, which was built in c. 1470, shows 20 saints painted on wood, of which all but two have survived, although these are defaced. It was restored in the 1840s.The outer panels depict the Apostles, the Virgin Mary and six saints. A second screen is now in the north aisle. The small carved figures in the spandrels are possibly early 15th century. According to an early 20th-century booklet produced by the church, the 20 panels (from north to south) depict: an obliterated saint; St Catherine of Alexandria; the Annunciation of the Blessed Virgin Mary; Gabriel; the Apostles Jude, Matthew, Philip, Thomas, Simon, Peter, Paul, Andrew, John, James the Greater, Bartholomew, and James the Less; St Barbara; St Mary Magdalene, Margaret, and an obliterated figure. The screen belongs to the Ranworth group.

The intricately carved telescopic baptismal font has a pelican at the top, and is suspended from a wooden beam. The large iron chest is unusual in that it has seven locks. It required seven people to be present if the chest needed to be unlocked, each possessing their own key. There are two misericord seats in the south chapel.

== People ==
A prominent feature of the inside of the church is the ornate marble tomb of Sir William Paston, 1st Baronet (1528–1610), who founded the Paston School. The alabaster monument above the tomb was made in 1608 by the London sculptors John Key and William Wright. It was commissioned by Sir William, and depicts him lying on his side propped up on his elbow. The monument has Ionic columns, three obelisks, Corinthian columns the Paston coat of arms, and a pair of supporters on either side of the uppermost obelisk. The accompanying epitaph was composed by Michael Tilles, the first headmaster of the Paston School.

The church’s monumental brasses commemorate Margarete Hetercete (1397); Sir Edmund Ward, Vicar, (1519); William Rous (1404); Sir Robert Wythe (1515); Robert Raunt (1625), (Note: Raunt was the Chief Constable of the Hundred of Tunstead. His brass is one of the first to depict the Arms of the Grocers' Company.) John Page (1627), William and Joan Bettynys (1460); and Robert Bradfield (15th century).

== Services and congregation ==
The rector of this Church of England parish as of 2026 is the Revd David Warner SCP. The other churches in the benefice (at Edingthorpe, Worstead, and Westwick) rotate their Sunday services.

St Nicholas Church is open each day of the week for visitors. Blessings for marriages held elsewhere, thanksgiving prayers, dedications, and requested for God’s blessing for same-sex couples are granted. The church's regular services are:

- Morning Prayer every week day
- A 'Market Day' service on Thursdays
- Holy Communion, held twice every Sunday
- A monthly Evening Prayer service.

== Sources ==
- Blomefield, Francis (1805). An Essay towards a Topographical History of the County of Norfolk. Vol. 11. London: W. Bulmer, and Co. OCLC 1569812785.
- Chase, F. A.; Page, C.H.W. (1923). The Story of St. Nicholas' Church, North Walsham, Norfolk. Norwich: Gibbs & Waller. OCLC 320182248.
- Pevsner, Nikolaus (1997). Norfolk 1 : Norwich and North-East. London: Penguin Books Ltd. ISBN 9780140710588.
