= North Walsham =

Coordinates: 52.8228°N 1.3869°E

- Town and civil parish
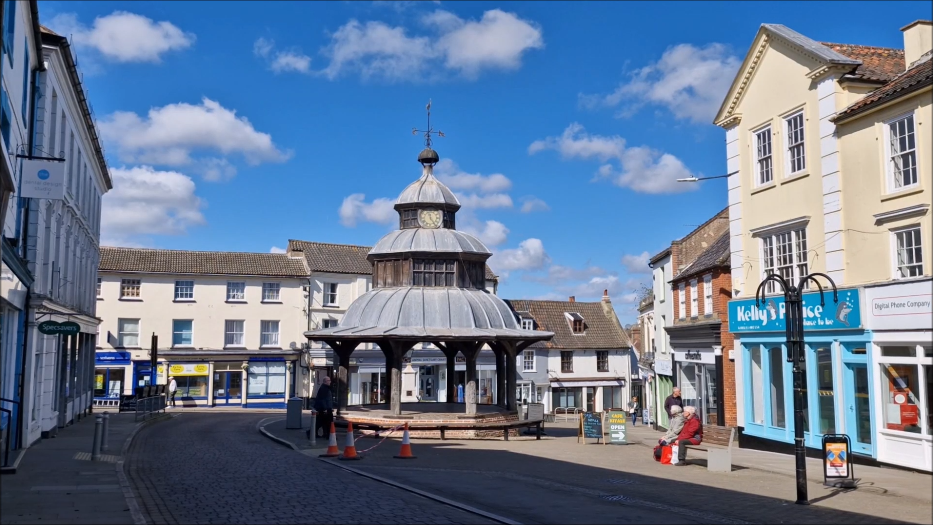
- The Market Cross in 2025

- Location within Norfolk
- Area: 17.27 km^{2} (6.67 sq mi)
- Population: 13,007 (2021 census)
  - Density: 753/km^{2} (1,950/sq mi)
- OS grid reference: TG282302
- District: North Norfolk
- Shire county: Norfolk
- Region: East
- Country: England
- Sovereign state: United Kingdom
- Post town: North Walsham
- Postcode district: NR28
- Dialling code: 01692
- Police: Norfolk
- Fire: Norfolk
- Ambulance: East of England
- UK Parliament: North Norfolk

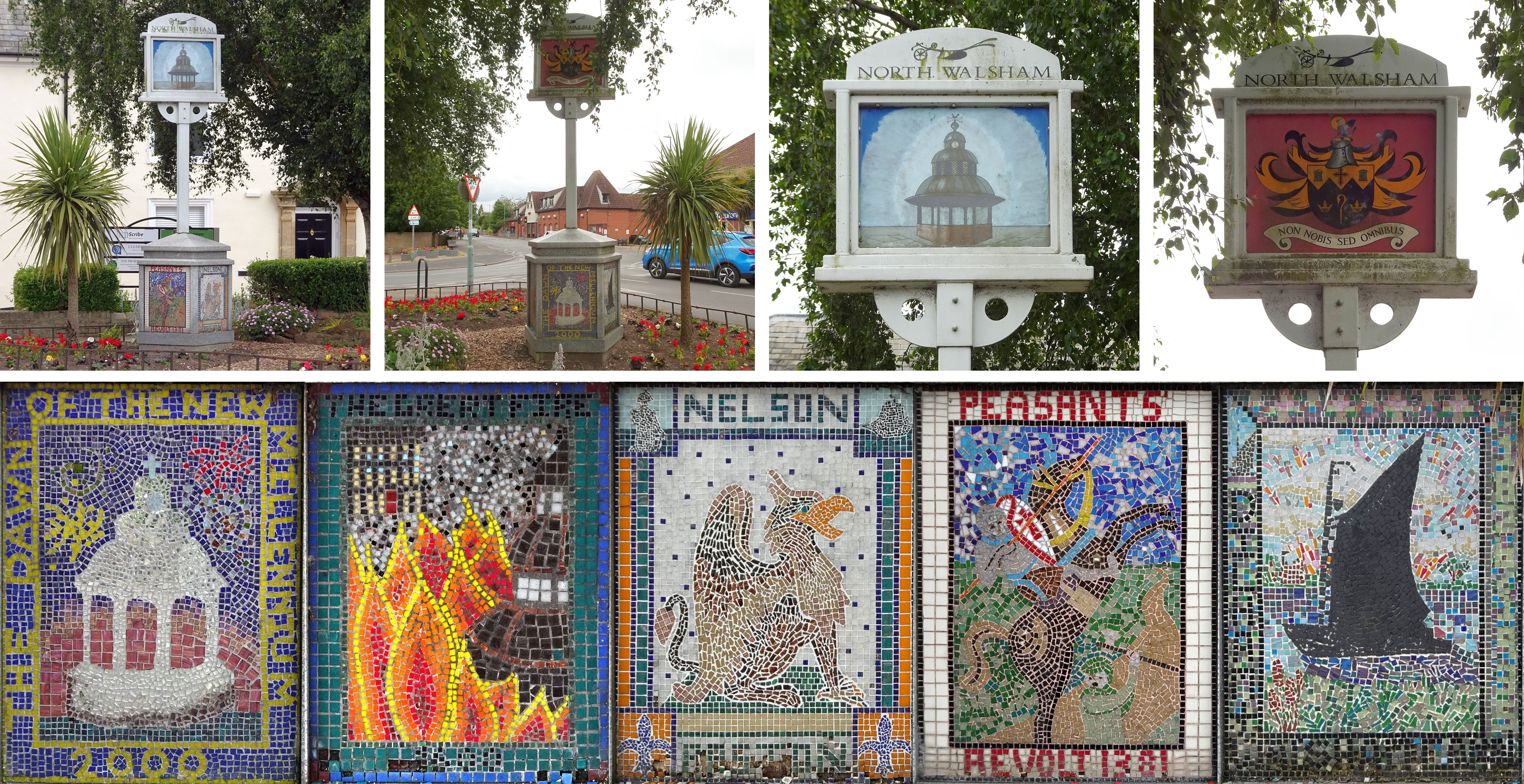
North Walsham Town Sign

North Walsham is a market town and civil parish in the North Norfolk district of the county of Norfolk, England. The town is located 8 mi (13 km) south of Cromer and Norwich is 15 mi (24 km) south.

In local dialect, North Walsham is pronounced "Nor Walsham", "Wals'm" "Wolsam"; "North Wolshum"

== History ==
The name Walsham derives from the Old English walhshām meaning 'Walh's village'.

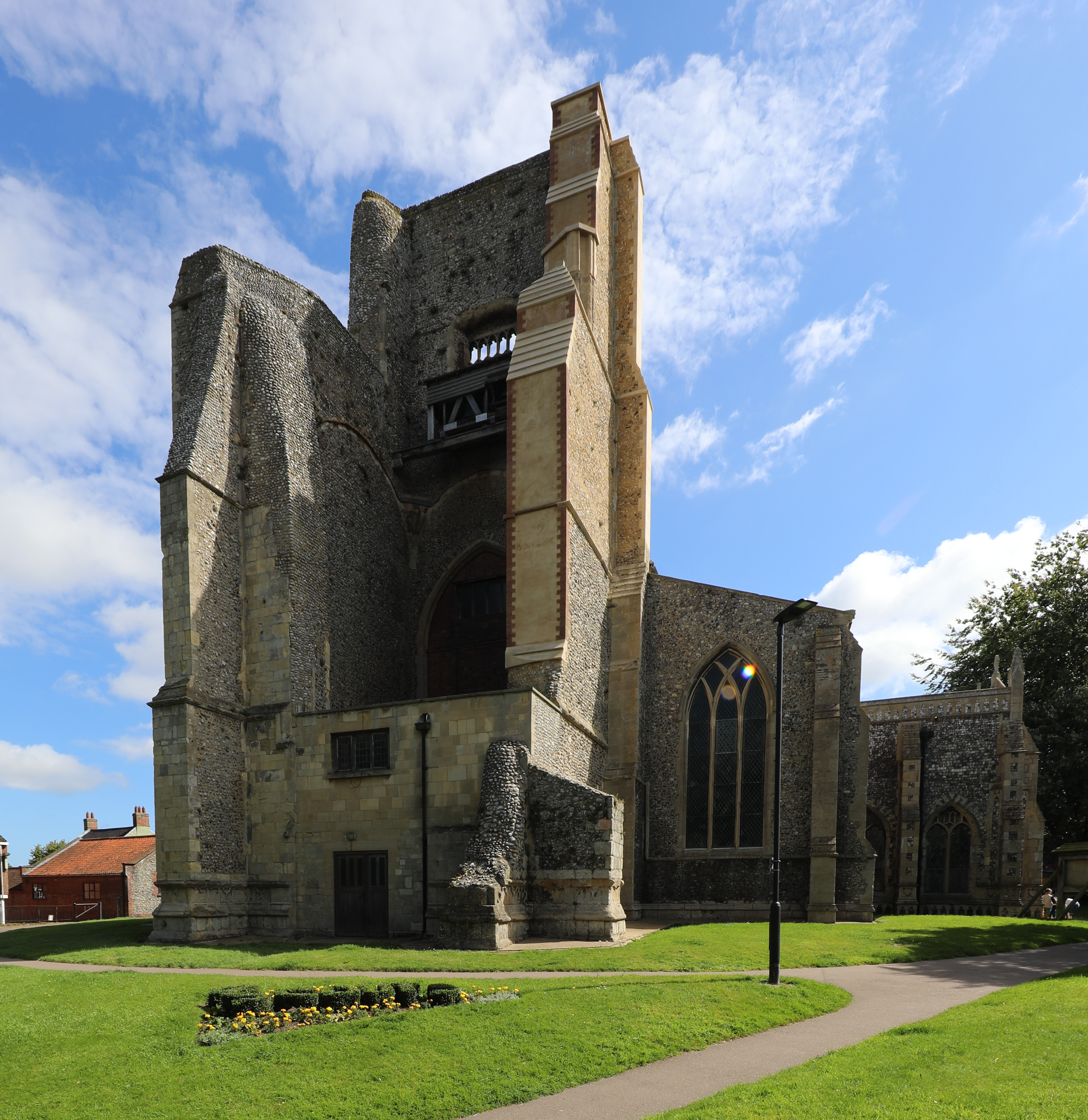
The ruined tower of the parish church, St Nicholas Church, North Walsham.

North Walsham, an Anglo-Saxon settlement, and the neighbouring village of Worstead became very prosperous from the twelfth century through the arrival of weavers from Flanders. The two settlements gave their names to the textiles they produced: 'Walsham' became the name of a lightweight cloth for summer wear, and 'Worsted' a heavier cloth. The fourteenth century 'wool churches' are a testament to the prosperity of the local mill owners. North Walsham's church of St. Nicholas was originally dedicated to the Blessed Virgin Mary and is one of the UK's largest parish churches. It was also the site of a wayside shrine to St. Thomas of Canterbury. This church had the second-tallest steeple in Norfolk until its collapse in 1724. Plans for its rebuilding were abandoned at the outbreak of the Second World War. The ruined tower dominates the town centre and is a famous landmark of the area, visible from many miles away. In the parish church of St. Nicholas can be found the ornate tomb of Sir William Paston; the remains of medieval painted screens; a telescopic Gothic font canopy; a unique royal arms board; an ancient iron-bound chest; and many other ancient artefacts.

North Walsham was involved in the Peasants' Revolt of 1381. The peasants' leaders were defeated at the Battle of North Walsham and the site is marked by a wayside stone near the town's water towers.

The Great Fire of North Walsham took place on 25 June 1600. It began at six o'clock in the morning from a house occupied by a person with the surname of Dowle. Dowle subsequently fled and was captured and placed in gaol. The fire was devastating and destroyed 118 homes, 70 shops, the market cross, and market stalls. Although the church caught fire in five places, the building was mostly undamaged. It provided shelter for people whilst the town was being rebuilt.

The English naval hero, Horatio Nelson, and his brother, William, were educated at Paston Grammar School in North Walsham, founded by Sir William Paston (of Paston Letters fame) in 1606. Nelson left the school to start his naval career at the age of eleven. The school became Paston College in 1984.

William Suffolk, who murdered one Mary Beck, was gibbeted on the outskirts of North Walsham after his execution on Castle Hill in Norwich in 1797, remaining there until the enclosure of the parish.

During World War II, a North Walsham man lost his life when his Royal Air Force training aeroplane crashed in the United States. Local residents living near the site, in the State of Oklahoma, erected a monument in 2000 honouring the lives of all four RAF fliers who perished. The residents, who include Choctaw Native American People, and the Choctaw Nation government, continue honouring the lives of all four on each anniversary of the crashes, which took place in February 1943.

As part of the millennium celebrations, ten mosaics were commissioned, showing scenes from local history, including the Peasants' Revolt and the Great Fire of North Walsham, and a picture of a Norfolk wherry – an allusion to the canal.

North Walsham Picturedrome opened in King Arms Street around 1912 and survived until around September 1931. In 1931 the Regal Cinema opened in New Road and was open until 1979. When the Regal closed, the building was turned into a Vauxhall car dealership and later a Plant hire business, but in 2018 was knocked down to make room for housing..

== Demographics ==
Census population of North Walsham parish
Census	Population	Female	Male	Households	Source
2001	11,998	6,304	5,694	5,245	
2011	12,634	6,619	6,015	5,597	
2021	13,007	6,793	6,214	6,136	

== Transport ==
The town is served by North Walsham railway station, on the Bittern Line between Norwich, Cromer and Sheringham. Services run generally hourly in both directions and are operated by Greater Anglia.

The main road through the town is the A149. The town is also located on the B1145, a route that runs between King's Lynn and Mundesley.

The town is on the North Walsham and Dilham Canal, which is privately owned by the North Walsham Canal Company. The canal ran from Antingham Mill, largely following the course of the River Ant to a point below Honing. A short branch canal leaves the main navigation near Honing and terminates at the village of Dilham.

== Culture ==
The town's park features an oak tree sculpture commemorating the battle of the Peasants' Revolt at North Walsham in 1381, and the Agricultural Workers Union being founded in the town in 1906. It is constructed from a 120-year-old tree that was diseased and was due to be felled. The sculpture was unveiled in September 1999.

The Black Swan Theatre, part of the Black Swan Public House and Theatre, is operated by New Stages, a not-for-profit Community Interest Company. They won 'Best (Pub) for Entertainment' at the Great British Pub Awards 2026. Previously, North Walsham had a Fisher Theatre (part of the Fisher family theatre circuit) 1828–1845, and the Atrium, a £5.3 million arts and education development attached to North Walsham High School, which was opened to the wider community 2012–2016.

North Walsham is home to the North Walsham Heritage Centre. The Heritage Centre displays information and artefacts on the whole range of the town's history. It is also home to the Norfolk Motorcycle Museum, a privately owned collection of around 80 motorcycles dating up to 1960. Toys are also on display, particularly die-cast toys.

North Walsham Ghost Walks (and themed historical tours) have been running in the town since 2013. They run throughout the year with themed walks around Halloween.

== Education ==
North Walsham High School is an academy school for pupils aged 11 to 16 located in the town. The school is administered by Enrich Learning Trust. The school converted from community school status in October 2019.

== Sport ==
North Walsham is home to a London 1 North rugby team. North Walsham R.F.C. narrowly missed out on promotion to National League 2 in 2005–06, losing a play-off to Nuneaton. It is also home to the North Norfolk Vikings Swimming Club who train at the Victory Leisure Centre on Station Road. There is a North Walsham parkrun every Saturday morning which is a free, timed 5k event at 9am at North Walsham High School. England footballer Lauren Hemp was born in the town and played for the local team as a child.

== Media ==
Regional local news and television programmes are provided by BBC East and ITV Anglia. Television signals are received from the Tacolneston TV transmitter and via a local relay transmitter in West Runton

Local radio stations are BBC Radio Norfolk on 95.6 FM, Heart East on 102.4 FM, Kiss on 106.1 FM, Greatest Hits Radio Norfolk & North Suffolk (formerly North Norfolk Radio) on 96.2 FM and Poppyland Radio, a community radio station that broadcast online.

The town is served by these local newspapers:

- Eastern Daily Press
- North Norfolk News
- Eastern Evening News

== Notable people ==
Lauren Hemp, footballer raised in North Walsham, was awarded Freedom of the Town in 2022.

== See also ==
- Listed buildings in North Walsham
