= Kung Pinmei counterrevolutionary clique =

1955 prosecution in the China

In 1955, the government of the People's Republic of China arrested a group of Catholic clerics (most prominently Shanghai Bishop Ignatius Kung Pinmei) and laity. The government described the group as the Kung Pinmei counterrevolutionary clique and prosecuted them for activities deemed counterrevolutionary.

== Background ==
During the Chinese Civil War, Pope Pius XII forbade Chinese Catholics from joining the Chinese Communist Party (CCP) or participating in its activities.

In 1950, the Holy See stated that participation in certain CCP-related organizations would result in excommunication from the Church.

China broke off diplomatic relations with the Holy See in 1951. The CCP framed these actions in terms of Chinese Catholics reclaiming their church in the context of broader opposition to Western imperialism.

In the 1950s, Shanghai was the major site of Catholic opposition to China's religious policies.

Ignatius Kung Pinmei, the Bishop of Shanghai, opposed the Three-Self Patriotic Movement. He stated that Catholics who joined the movement, the CCP, or the Communist Youth League could no longer receive the Catholic sacraments.

== Prosecution ==
In 1955, the government arrested dozens of Catholic clerics and laity in Shanghai.

Jesuit superior Fernand Lacretelle was among those arrested and he provided a detailed confession to authorities. Vincent Zhu Hongsheng, who became a significant figure in the underground church, described Lacretelle as having "completely sold all of us out."

Shortly after his arrest, Aloysius Jin Luxian began to cooperate with the Chinese government. Jin provided information about the church's resistance to government policies and accused Kung and others. In a 2006 interview, Jin explained these actions by pointing out that Lacretelle had already provided a lengthy confession and that Jin felt that the damage had already been done. In his memoirs, Jin wrote regarding Lacretelle's confession, "[Why had he] dumped on us even the crime of forming an anti-revolutionary clique? What evil intention did he have in mind? Could he possibly not be aware of the serious nature of this kind of accusation? Could it be that people of a different race are always disloyal?"

Trial occurred in 1960. Kung was sentenced to life imprisonment. Jin was sentenced to 18 years in prison. The verdict stated that Jin did not deny his role and had revealed activities to mobilize the church against the government. The other priests received sentences ranging from five to 20 years imprisonment. Some of these priests expressed repentance for their actions, which decreased the length of their sentences.

In 1979, Kung appealed his sentence. Kung wrote that he had previously been reticent to appeal because he did not wish to bring up old matters, but that since Spring of 1979, "officials have come many times to re-examine cases and to announce that unjust verdicts could be appealed." Kung contended that the reason for his arrest was his opposition to the Three-Self Patriotic Movement, including his statement that those who joined the movement (or joined the CCP or the Communist Youth League) could not receive the sacraments. Kung wrote that because religious freedom was guaranteed by the Constitution of China, he could not be charged with his opposition to the Three-Self Patriotic Movement, and therefore authorities had falsely charged him with participating in a counterrevolutionary group. The appeal failed.

== Legacy ==
Kung was secretly named a Cardinal in pectore in the consistory of 1979 by Pope John Paul II. In 1985, Kung was paroled from prison through article 73 of the penal code, which stated that people with life sentences could be rehabilitated if they had served at least ten years of their sentence and had demonstrated repentance. Kung was released to the care of the patriotic church. In a speech to Catholics the next afternoon at Bishop Louis Zhang Jiasu's residence, Kung stated:

You have got into trouble because of me and have suffered a lot. I hope you will all forgive me ... From now on, I must observe the commandments and love the Church, observe the law and love my country, and serve the Four Modernizations of the fatherland as long as I am alive. I am already advanced in years. What little I can do, I think God will have his plan. I will follow the arrangements made by the government and the bishop. In sum, I hope you will all please forgive me."

For three years, Kung lived in house arrest at the bishop's residence next to St. Ignatius Cathedral. Later, Kung moved to the United States.

Jin was released from prison in 1982 and became the founding rector of the Sheshan Major Seminary, outside of Shanghai. He was ordained bishop of Shanghai without Vatican approval in 1985.

Joseph Fan Zhongliang was not initially permitted to return to Shanghai after his release from prison. He taught at a school for labor camp guards until 1985, when authorities permitted him to go to Shanghai where he stayed with his niece. Fan was a significant figure in the underground church and became a bishop.

== See also ==
- Laws regarding religious activities in China
