= St. Ignatius Cathedral =

Catholic Latin Church cathedral in Shanghai

Cathedral of Saint Ignatius of Loyola
- Xu-Jia-Hui Catholic Cathedral 圣 依 纳 爵 主 教 座 堂
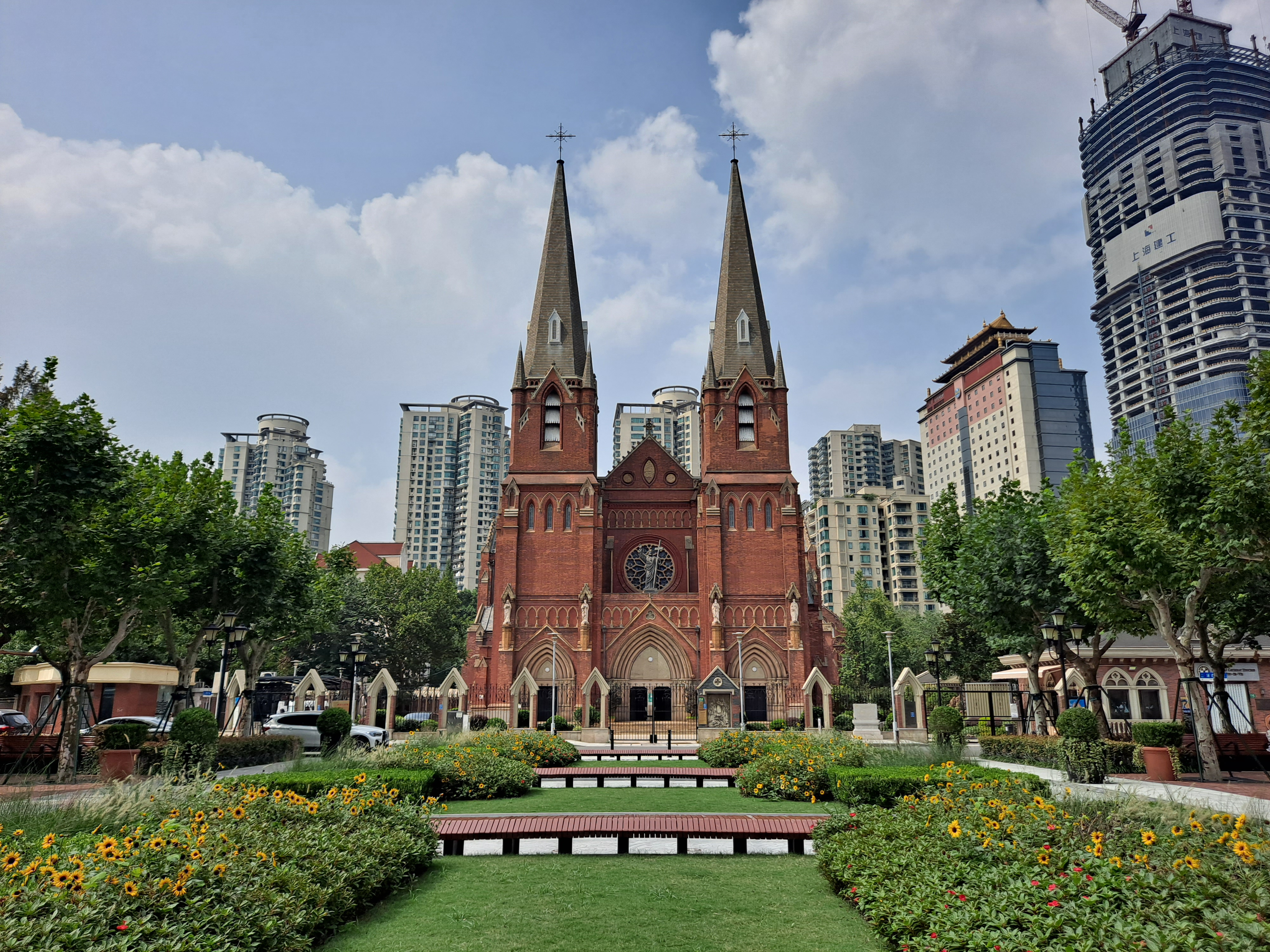
- The National Cathedral Church of China
- Cathedral of Saint Ignatius of Loyola
- 31°11′35″N 121°25′53″E
- Location: Shanghai
- Country: China
- Denomination: Catholic Church
- Sui iuris church: Latin Church

History
- Status: Cathedral

Architecture
- Architect: Sir William Doyle
- Architectural type: Church
- Style: Gothic Revival
- Groundbreaking: 1851
- Completed: 1910

Administration
- Diocese: Shanghai

Clergy
- Bishop: Joseph Shen Bin

The Cathedral of Saint Ignatius of Loyola (Latin: Cathedralis Nationalem de Sciamhævensis in Sinis, Chinese: 圣依纳爵主教座堂), also known as the Xujiahui Cathedral (Chinese: 徐家汇主教座堂) or sometimes known as the Xujiahui Catholic Church (Chinese: 徐家汇天主教堂), is the Catholic cathedral of the Latin Church diocese of Shanghai, located in Xujiahui, Shanghai, China.

The church was originally dedicated to Saint Ignatius of Loyola, partly due to the French Jesuit Order once affiliated with the shrine.

The original altar of this cathedral was imported from Paris, France, and arrived in the Easter Sunday of 1919. Today, an image of the Blessed Virgin Mary Help of Christians is dedicated within the church, being the Marian title consecrated in 1924 as Patroness of the entire Chinese motherland. Since 1960, the church has been the seat of the Bishop of Shanghai and the headquarters of the Diocese of Shanghai. It was designed in the Neo-Gothic style by William Doyle and built between 1906 and 1910.

== History ==
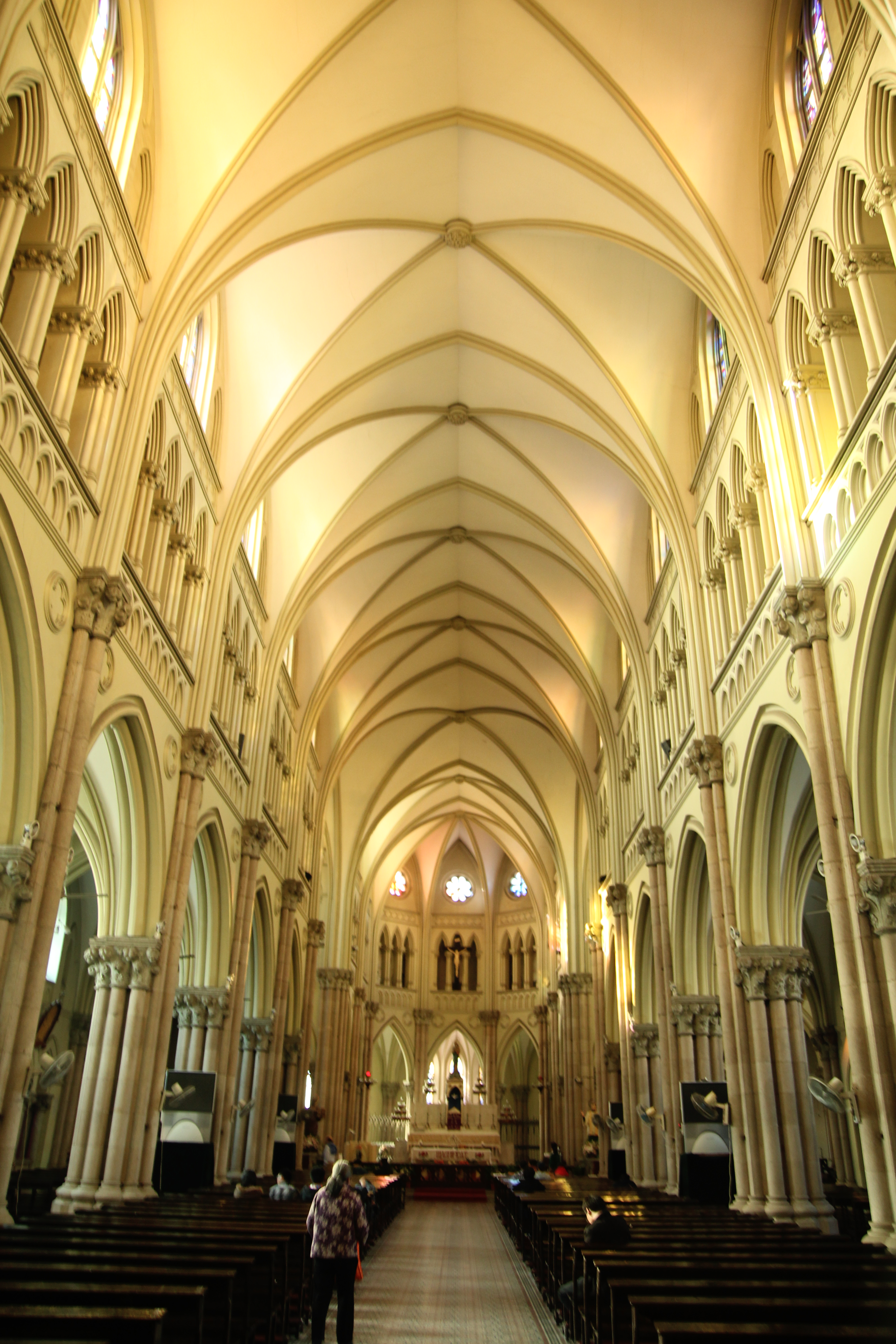
Interior of the Cathedral.

The first church at Zikawei (now spelled Xujiahui as per the Mandarin pronunciation) was built in 1851. A medium-sized, Greek style church was built in 1851 (demolished in the 1980s to make way for the new headquarters of the Shanghai Diocese).

With the growth of Zikawei as a center of Catholicism, a new, larger church was commissioned. Designed by English architect William Doyle, and built by French Jesuits between 1906 and 1910, it is said to have once been known as "the grandest church in the Far East." It can accommodate 2,500 worshippers at the same time.

In 1960, the cathedra of the Bishop of Shanghai was moved from the older but smaller Cathedral of Saint Francis Xavier at Dongjiadu to Saint Ignatius, and Zikawei became the headquarters of the Roman Catholic Diocese of Shanghai. The former Bishop of Shanghai, Ignatius Kung Pin-Mei was arrested in 1955 and sentenced to life imprisonment in 1960 as the alleged center of the Kung Pinmei counterrevolutionary clique, so the move to Zikawei occurred under Louis Zhang Jiashu, the Chinese government-approved Bishop of Shanghai.

The church building was heavily damaged in 1966, at the opening of the Cultural Revolution, Red Guards from Beijing vandalized the cathedral, tearing down its spires and ceiling, and smashing its roughly 300 square meters of stained glass. Red Guards also beat up priests and nuns at the church. Powerless to resist, Bishop Aloysius Zhang Jiashu knelt at the altar and prayed until he was dragged away – for the duration of the Cultural Revolution, he was "sent down" for labour, repairing umbrellas and washing bottles. For the next ten years the cathedral served as a state-owned grain warehouse.

In 1978, the cathedral was re-opened, and the spires were restored in the early 1980s. The government compensated the church for repairs.

Bishop Louis Zhang Jiashu's urn is and memorial tablet is placed at the side altar of St. Ignatius Cathedral. He was the first bishop of the People's Republic of China era to be memorialized in this way.

In 1989, the first Catholic Mass in Mandarin was celebrated by order of Bishop Aloysius Jin Luxian. The celebrants were Father Thomas Law of Hong Kong, Father Joseph Zen of Hong Kong (later named bishop and Cardinal of Hong Kong), and Father Edward Malatesta, S.J., of San Francisco, U.S.A.

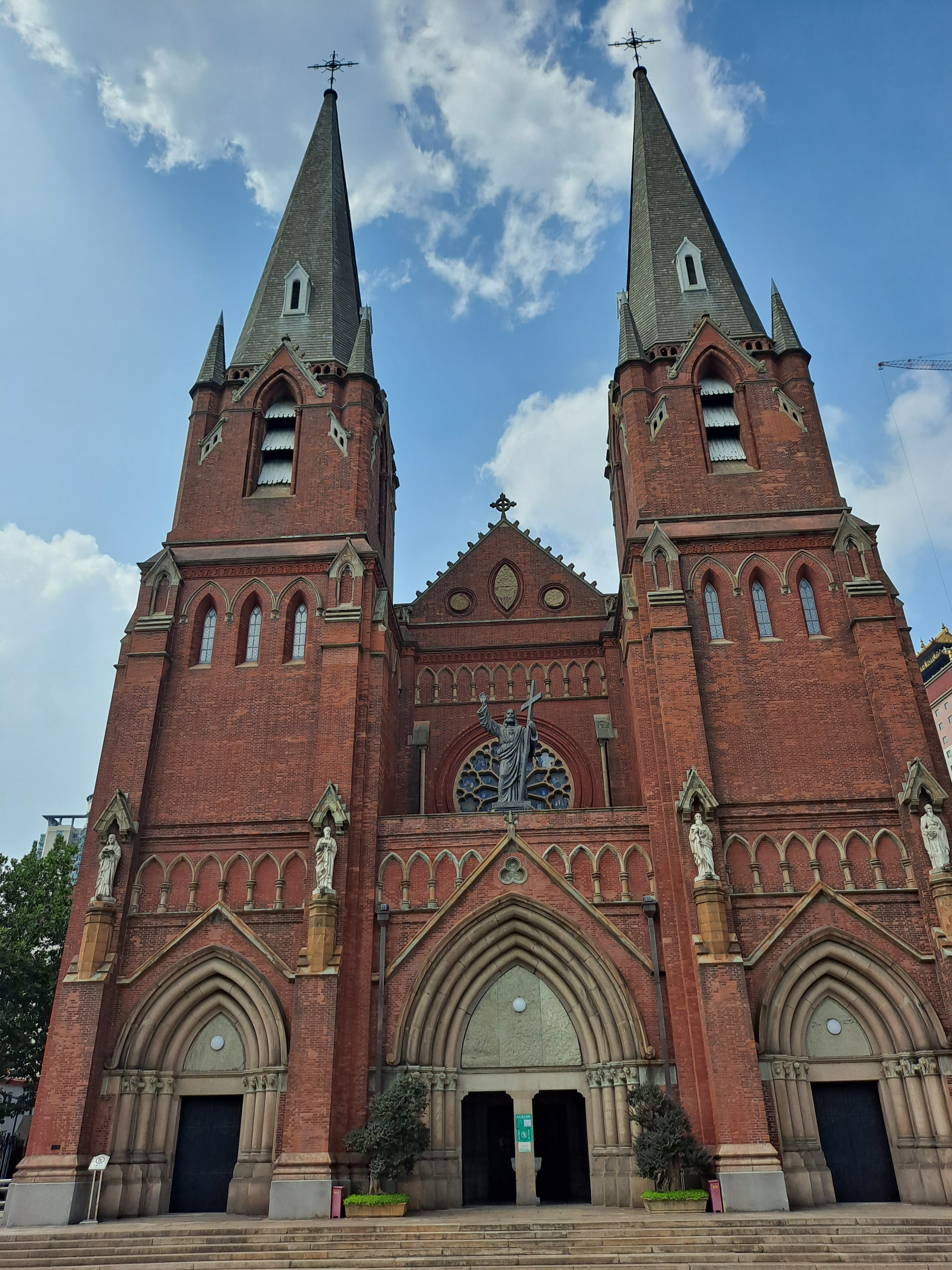
Close-up shot of the cathedral

The building's restoration is continuing. In 2002, Wo Ye, a Beijing-born artist, and Father Thomas Lucas, a Jesuit from the University of San Francisco, began a five-year project to replace the cathedral's stained glass windows. The new windows incorporate Chinese characters and iconography, and were first unveiled in time for the 2010 World Expo in Shanghai.

In 2014, an image of the Blessed Virgin Mary as Our Lady of China was enshrined within the church. The image was created by the renowned Spanish sculptor Antonio Jesús Yuste y Navarro. (The 8th recipient of the La Hornacina Award prize of Spain)

On 4 November 2018, an image of Mary, Help of Christians was also enshrined. The image was brought from the Philippines and was created by local Pampanga artisan Thomas Joven (Deceased).

== Location ==
The cathedral is located near the Xujiahui Metro station, exit No. 3.

== In Film ==
The cathedral was featured in the opening scenes of Steven Spielberg's film Empire of the Sun (1987). However, this is not the cathedral in the original book Empire of the Sun by J. G. Ballard, who attended the school at the Anglican Holy Trinity Church in Shanghai.

== See also ==
- List of Catholic cathedrals in China
- Bishop Ma Daqin
- List of Jesuit sites
- https://www.paulleestudio.com/shanghai
