= St. Francis Xavier Church (Shanghai) =

Roman Catholic cathedral in Shanghai, China

- 董家渡圣方济各沙勿略堂
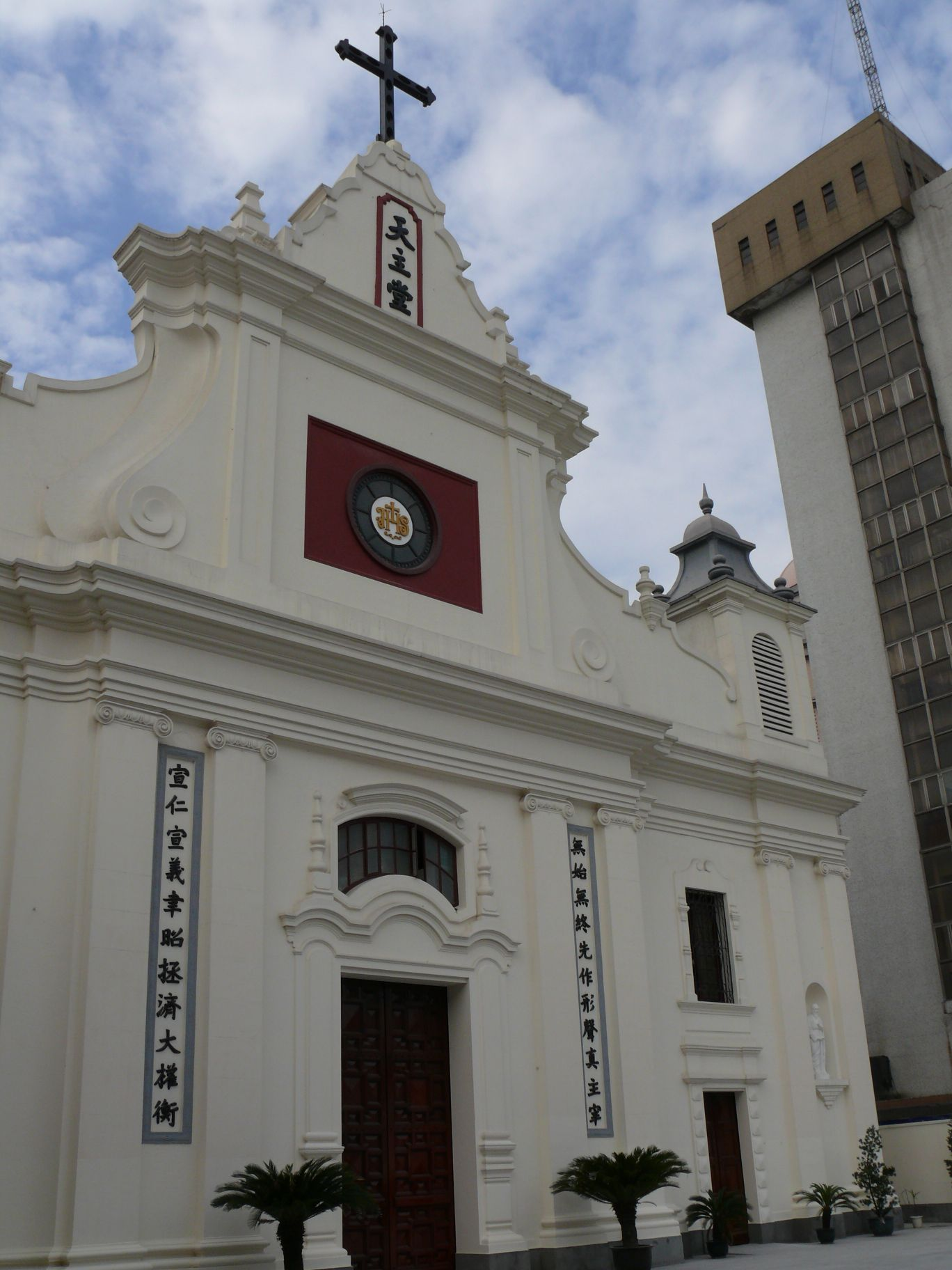
- Interactive map of St. Francis Xavier Church
- Location: Dongjiadu, Huangpu District, Shanghai, China
- Coordinates: 31°13′00″N 121°30′00″E
- Built: 1853
- Website: www.sfx.sh

The St. Francis Xavier Church (simplified Chinese: 圣方济各沙勿略堂; traditional Chinese: 聖方濟各沙勿略堂) or Dongjiadu Catholic Church (董家渡天主堂), formerly known as the Cathedral of St Francis Xavier at Tungkiatu or Dongjiadu Cathedral (董家渡主教座堂), is a Neo-Baroque Roman Catholic cathedral in Dongjiadu (Tungkiatu), Shanghai, China.

== History ==
The first Catholic church in China (Church of the Savior) was built in 1553 within the Old City of Shanghai, but was confiscated with the suppression of Catholicism in 1731, and converted into a shrine to Guan Yu and a school. In 1846, the suppression edict was rescinded, and French missionaries sought the return of the church property. The governor of Shanghai offered instead to compensate the church with three plots of land outside the city walls, at Tungkatu (Dongjiadu), Zikawei (Xujiahui), and Yang-king-pang .

In 1847, Fr. Ludovico Maria (die Conti) Besi, an Italian Jesuit and the Apostolic Administrator of Nanjing, decided to build a church and residence at Tong-ka-du. The Cathedral was to be constructed in the baroque style, with a design recalling Sant'Ignazio Church, Rome. Construction started in 1849 and it wasn't completed until 1853, when it was officially opened on Pentecost and dedicated to Fr. Francis Xavier. Because the church was located in the area of the Dong family owned pier (Tong-ka-du or Dongjiadu), the church was known as the Dongjiadu cathedral, a name it still holds to this day.

The church was the seat of the vicar apostolic of Kiang-nan. From 1946, when Shanghai was raised to a diocese, until 1960, the Cathedral of St Francis Xavier was the seat of the bishop of Shanghai. In 1960, after the Communist takeover of Shanghai and the arrest and imprisonment of the leaders of the Shanghai Diocese, the cathedra of the Bishop of Shanghai was moved from the older but smaller Cathedral of St Francis Xavier at Dongjiadu to St Ignatius at Zikawei (Xujiahui), and Zikawei became the headquarters of the Roman Catholic Diocese of Shanghai. Ignatius Kung Pin-Mei, Bishop of Shanghai, had been arrested in 1955 and sentenced to life imprisonment in 1960, so the move to Zikawei occurred under Aloysius Zhang Jiashu, the Bishop of Shanghai according to the Chinese government-approved "Catholic" church.

Dongjiadu Cathedral was shut in 1966 at the start of the Cultural Revolution, and became a factory warehouse. In 1982, mass was resumed in a portion of the church returned to the diocese, and 1984 most of the main church was returned. The remainder of the church was returned and restored in 2005.

From 2017, as part of a project to construct a new financial zone in Dongjiadu, Dongjiadu Cathedral was closed for a restoration project involving completely excavating the base of the cathedral from within and strengthening its foundations. The subsidiary buildings of the cathedral will be demolished.

== Location ==
It is located near the waterfront between the Old City of Shanghai and The Bund, on Dongjiadu Road. In 2018 the church is surrounded by a large construction site and it's closed.

== See also ==
- List of Catholic cathedrals in China
- List of Jesuit sites
