= Joseph Fan Zhongliang =

Chinese Roman Catholic bishop (1918–2014)

His Excellency, The Most Reverend Joseph Fan Zhongliang SJ
- Bishop of Shanghai
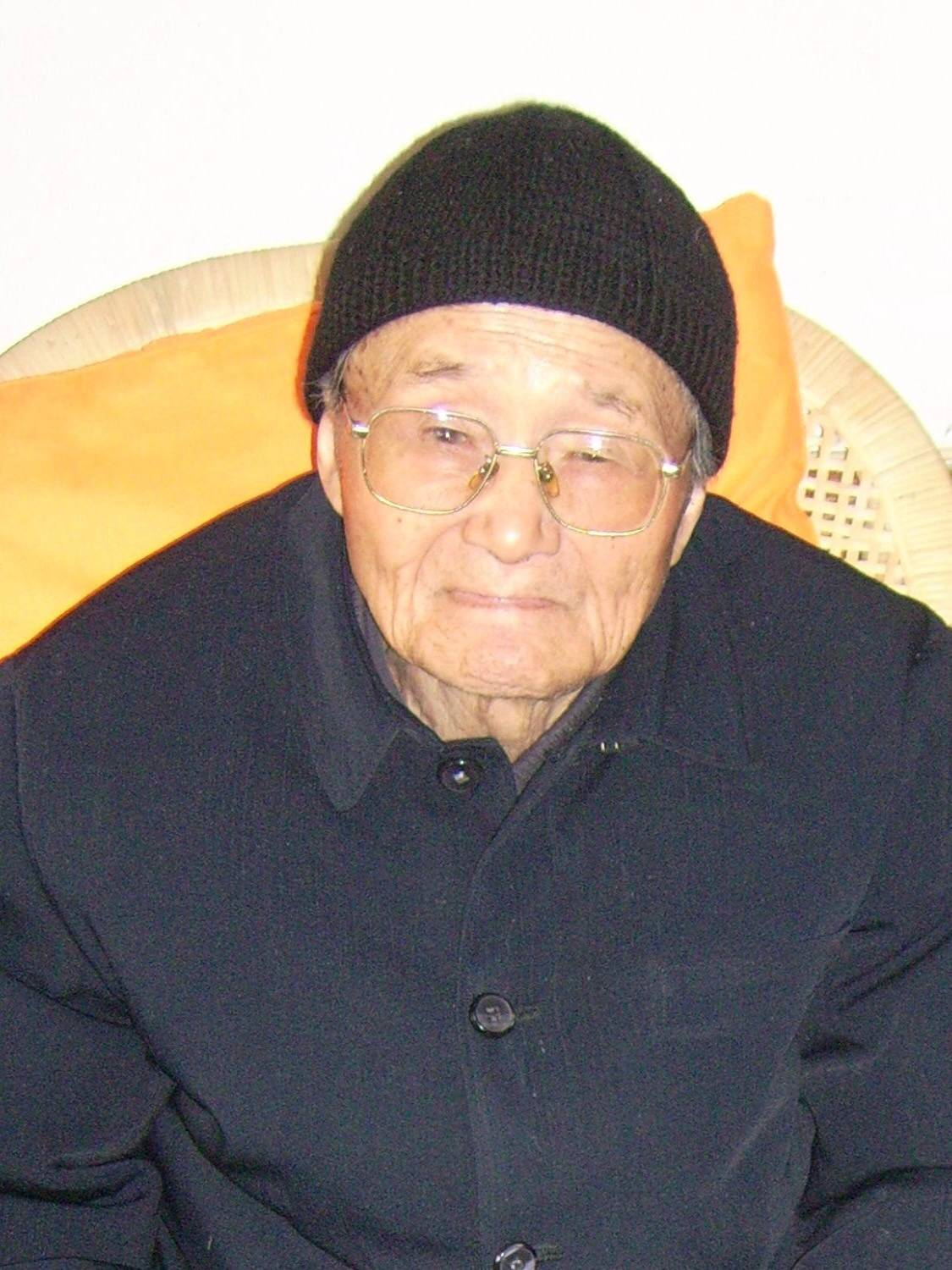
- Taken in 2010
- Church: Roman Catholic Church
- Diocese: Diocese of Shanghai
- See: St Francis Xavier Cathedral in Dong Jia Du
- Installed: 12 March 2000
- Term ended: 16 March 2014
- Predecessor: Ignatius Kung Pin-Mei
- Successor: Thaddeus Ma Daqin (Holy See); Sede vacante (CPCA)

Orders
- Ordination: 1951 by Ignatius Kung Pin-Mei
- Consecration: 27 February 1985 (clandestinely) by Matthias Lu Zhen-sheng

Personal details
- Born: 18 December 1918 Shanghai, China
- Died: 16 March 2014 (aged 95) Shanghai, China
- Motto: Ut Omnes Unum Sint
- Coat of arms

Joseph Fan Zhongliang S.J. (Chinese: 范忠良; pinyin: Fàn Zhōngliáng; 18 December 1918 – 16 March 2014), also known as Josephus Vei Zong Leong, was a Chinese Roman Catholic bishop in the Diocese of Shanghai in China.

== Life ==
Fan was born in 1918. His family was not Christian.

Fan attended St. Ignatius High School, where he was impressed by the Jesuit teachers and decided to become baptised in 1932. He joined the Jesuits in 1938 and became a priest in 1951. He was arrested together with Bishop Ignatius Kung Pin-Mei of Shanghai and other priests in 1955 as [part of what the government described as the Kung Pinmei counterrevolutionary clique. He was convicted of counter-revolutionary activities and sentenced to 20 years in jail in 1958 and sent to a work camp in Qinghai Province.

After his release in 1978, he taught at a high school in Qinghai. The Bishop of Qinghai ordained him Coadjutor Bishop of Shanghai on 27 February 1985, while the Bishop was in jail.

Security police arrested him again on numerous occasions, and ransacked his flat. In 1992, the accounts of the entire Shanghai underground church were closed down, along with many of the Bishop's personal accounts, including the bishopric.

Formally, Cardinal Ignatius Kung Pin-Mei was the leader of the church in Shanghai. After a long prison sentence in China, he moved to the United States, and died there in 2000. At that point, the Holy See appointed Fan Zhongliang as the successor of Cardinal Kung as the Bishop of Shanghai. During Pope John Paul's 1998 consistory, the Los Angeles Times hinted that Fan Zhongliang was one of the two cardinals created in pectore; (Note: Kung Pin-Mei himself had been reserved in pectore in 1979 and not published until 1991.) however at the next consistory in 2001 it would be revealed that the in pectore cardinals were Marian Jaworski and Jānis Pujāts.

Later, the Chinese Communist Party named Aloysius Jin Luxian, SJ as the Bishop of Shanghai, causing a rift in the Church. Both bishops were advanced in years, and due to a change in the political climate in the People's Republic of China, decided to work together. They, with the support of the Vatican and the Church in the region, chose a candidate to succeed them. This was Joseph Xing Wenzhi, who was named by the bishopric as auxiliary bishop on 28 June 2005.

Upon the death of Bishop Jin in April 2013, the Holy See hinted that Bishop Thaddeus Ma Daqin has changed from being the Auxiliary Bishop of Shanghai to the Coadjutor Bishop. However, the Chinese Patriotic Catholic Association continued to deny the validity of Bishop Fan and stripped Bishop Ma of his title as of December 2012, thereby observing a sede vacante in Shanghai, until the Chinese government transferred the Bishop of Haimen, Msgr Joseph Shen Bin, to the Diocese of Shanghai, without the Pope's approval, in 2023.

== Notes ==
Catholic Church titles
| Preceded by Ignatius Kung Pin-mei | Bishop of Shanghai; 2000–2014 | Succeeded by Thaddeus Ma Daqin |
