= Joseph Xing Wenzhi =

- Born: 17 April 1963 (age 62); Shandong province
- Disappeared: c. 11 December 2011 (aged 48)
- Status: Missing for 13 years, 10 months and 7 days
- Occupation: Auxiliary bishop
- Known for: Unsolved disappearance

Joseph Xing Wenzhi (Chinese: 邢文之; pinyin: Xing Wénzhī; born 1963) is an auxiliary bishop in the Diocese of Shanghai.

Joseph Xing Wenzhi
- Auxiliary Bishop Emeritius of Shanghai
- Diocese: Shanghai
- Installed: 28 June 2005
- Term ended: July 2012

Orders
- Ordination: 2 June 1990
- Consecration: 28 June 2005 by Aloysius Jin Luxian

Personal details
- Born: 17 April 1963 (age 62) Shandong, China

== Background ==
Xing was born in 1963 in Shandong. Xing's formation was in the Sheshan Seminary and became a priest in 1990.

In 2005, Pope John Paul II named Xing auxiliary bishop in the Diocese of Shanghai and confirmed by Pope Benedict XVI. Bishop Aloysius Jin Luxian consecrated him bishop on June 28, 2005. He was recognized by both Pope Benedict XVI. and the Chinese government. He was regarded the designated successor of Jin, until he disappeared by the end of 2011. Msgr. Thaddeus Ma Daqin became his successor in July 2012.

== See also ==
- List of people who disappeared mysteriously: post-1990
