= Thaddeus Ma Daqin =

Chinese Catholic prelate (born 1968)

His Excellency, The Most Reverend Thaddeus Ma Daqin
- Bishop Emeritus of Shanghai
- Church: Roman Catholic
- Diocese: Diocese of Shanghai
- Installed: 16 March 2014
- Predecessor: Joseph Fan Zhongliang
- Successor: Joseph Shen Bin

Orders
- Ordination: 18 December 1994
- Consecration: 7 July 2012 by Aloysius Jin Luxian

Personal details
- Born: 1968 (age 57–58) Shanghai, China
- Motto: Ut Sint Unum Ad Majorem Dei Gloriam
- Coat of arms: Thaddeus Ma Daqin's coat of arms

Ordination history of Thaddeus Ma Daqin
History
Episcopal consecration
- Consecrated by: Aloysius Jin Luxian (Shanghai coad.)

Styles of Thaddeus Ma Daqin
- Reference style: His Excellency; The Most Reverend
- Spoken style: Your Excellency
- Religious style: Bishop

Thaddeus Ma Daqin (Chinese: 马达钦; born 1968, Shanghai, China) is a Chinese Catholic prelate who served as Bishop of Shanghai from 2014 until 2023.

He was appointed as auxiliary bishop with the approval of the Holy See and Chinese Government in July 2012. Daqin announced his resignation from the Chinese government mandated Catholic Patriotic Association at his episcopal ordination Mass, and was taken into custody as a result. The Chinese Government has detained him under house arrest ever since (largely confined to Sheshan Seminary) and has prevented him from carrying out his episcopal duties.

The Chinese government unilaterally appointed a new bishop of Shanghai in April 2023, which the Vatican approved in July 2023.

== Early life and priesthood ==
Ma was born in Shanghai and was ordained as a priest in 1994, after graduating from the Sheshan Seminary. He is a former editor of the Shanghai Diocese's Guangqi Press, one of the two main Catholic publishers in the People's Republic of China. He served as head of Shanghai Pudong Deanery and, in December 2011, was appointed as Vicar General by Bishop Aloysius Jin Luxian.

== Bishop ==
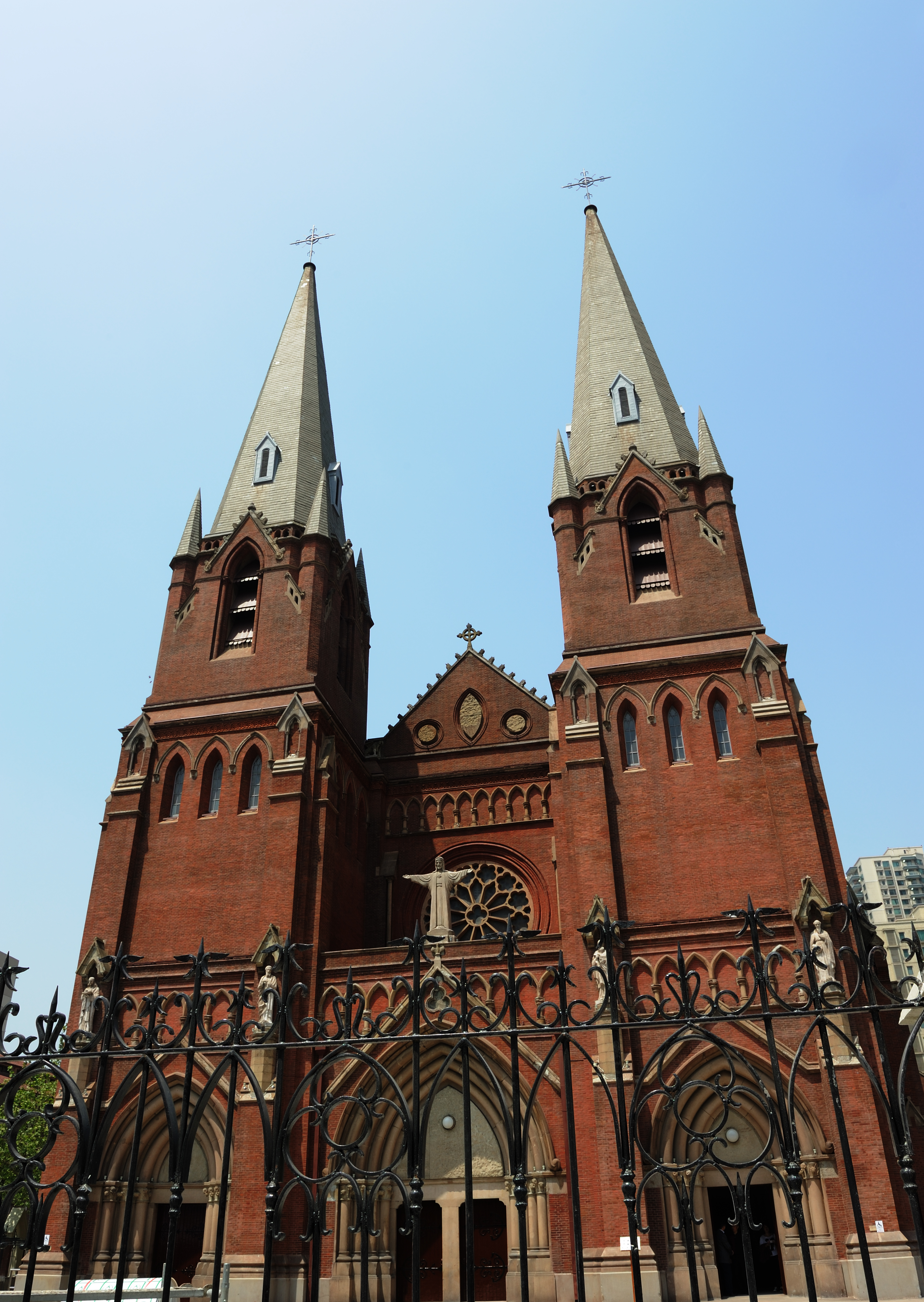
St. Ignatius Cathedral, Xujiahui, Shanghai. Ma was ordained a bishop here on 7 July 2012, and thereafter was taken into custody.

In 1951, the Chinese government severed formal ties with the Vatican, and by Chinese law Catholic worship is only permitted in government-controlled churches. Many of China's estimated 10 million Catholics are believed to have remained loyal to the Pope, gathering in underground churches. The Chinese government claims the authority to approve and appoint bishops.

In 2012, Ma received the approval of both Beijing and the Holy See for appointment as an Auxiliary Bishop of Shanghai. On 7 July 2012 was consecrated a bishop. In Shanghai's St. Ignatius Cathedral, in front of a congregation which included Communist Party officials, Ma used his ordination speech to announce his resignation from the Catholic Patriotic Association.

Ordination as Auxiliary Bishop and House Arrest

Catholic priests and nuns had gathered outside the Cathedral in protest at the participation of Vincent Zhan Silu in the ceremony. Zhan had been appointed "bishop" without the approval of the Vatican, and was loyal to the Patriotic Association. Bishop Jin and two other Vatican affirmed bishops performed the "laying on of hands" ritual to invoke the Holy Spirit during the ceremony. Zhan and two other bishops were also supposed to perform the ritual, but, according to Reuters, Ma "prevented them from putting their hands on his head by rising from his knees and hugging the three bishops instead."

Speaking from the pulpit, Ma then acknowledged the presence of the priests and nuns outside the cathedral, before speaking of the need for him to now focus on the pastoral duties of bishop rather than the bureaucratic duties of a Patriotic Association bishop: "Therefore, starting from this day of consecration, I will no longer find it convenient to be a member of the Patriotic Association," he said. He also refused to share a chalice with a bishop who has been excommunicated by the Roman Church.

Ma's words drew loud applause from the 1,000-member congregation, but was seen by the government as a challenge to state control of Catholic churches and clergy. According to Reuters, Ma soon disappeared from public view, "instructed by the late bishop Aloysius Jin Luxian to move to a mountainside seminary outside Shanghai, where he has been confined... He was stripped of his new title, questioned by officials for weeks and required to attend communist indoctrination classes."

Appointment as Bishop of Shanghai

In December 2013, the BBC reported that Bishop Ma had not seen in public for almost 18 months and that during his confinement at Sheshan Seminary, he was being given "political lessons – communist indoctrination by any other name – three times a week".

Upon the death of Bishop Joseph Fan Zhongliang on 16 March 2014, the Holy See recognized Bishop Ma as the Bishop of the Diocese of Shanghai. That month Reuters reported that Ma remained at the Sheshan Seminary, regularly posting blog items for the faithful: "mostly excerpts from scripture and greetings to his flock." After the death of Nelson Mandela, Ma cited one of the anti-Apartheid leader's most famous quotes: "Freedom is indivisible; the chains on any one of my people were the chains on all of them, the chains on all my people were the chains on me."

== See also ==
- Religion in China
- Catholic Patriotic Association
- Freedom of religion in the People's Republic of China
- Ignatius Gong Pinmei
- K. H. Ting

Catholic Church titles
Preceded by Joseph Fan Zhongliang	Bishop of Shanghai; 2014–2023	Succeeded by Joseph Shen Bin
