= Shanghai Cathedral =

Shanghai Cathedral may refer to:

- St. Ignatius Cathedral of Shanghai
- Holy Trinity Cathedral, Shanghai
