= Louis Zhang Jiashu =

Chinese Jesuit, non-canonical bishop (1893–1988)

The Most Reverend Louis Zhang Jiashu SJ
- Bishop of Shanghai
- Zhang in episcopal dress with a biretta and a pectoral cross
- Native name: 张家树
- Church: Catholic Church
- Diocese: Shanghai
- In office: 1960–1988
- Predecessor: Ignatius Kung Pin-mei; Francis Xavier Zhang Shilang (without Vatican approval)
- Successor: Aloysius Jin Luxian

Orders
- Consecration: 1960 (without Vatican approval)

Personal details
- Born: 30 June 1893 Shanghai, Jiangsu, Qing China
- Died: 25 February 1988 (aged 94) Shanghai, China

Louis Zhang Jiashu (Note: Simplified Chinese: 张家树; traditional Chinese: 張家樹; pinyin: Zhāng Jiāshù, born Zhang Duanliu (張端六), with courtesy name Tinggui (庭桂). Also known as Aloysius.) SJ (30 June 1893 – 25 February 1988) was a Chinese Jesuit priest. A founding member of the Chinese Catholic Patriotic Association (CCPA) in 1957, Zhang was elected and consecrated as the Bishop of Shanghai in 1960 without Vatican approval. He then suffered persecution during the Cultural Revolution, but resumed his position after the movement and became a political figure in his final years.

Born and raised in Shanghai, Zhang completed his Jesuit formation in Europe and returned to China in 1925. After the 1955 arrest of Bishop Ignatius Kung Pin-mei, Zhang supported the Chinese Communist Party and the self-election, self-consecration practice, in which diocesan priests elect their own bishops, and eventually became bishop in the same manner. After the Cultural Revolution, he became a delegate to the 5th National People's Congress, and a member of the Standing Committee of the 5th and 6th Chinese People's Political Consultative Conference. In 1980 he was elected the inaugural leader of both the Bishops' Conference of Catholic Church in China and the Chinese Catholic Church Affairs Committee.

In his final years, Zhang founded the Sheshan Seminary in 1982 and served as its first president of the board. He also met with world religious figures including Robert Runcie, John Baptist Wu, and Desmond Tutu.

== Biography ==
=== Early life, education, and ministry (1893–1949) ===
Zhang was born on 30 June 1893 in the Old City of Shanghai to a Catholic family from Nanhui. His birth name was Zhang Duanliu (張端六), and his courtesy name was Tinggui (庭桂). He was baptized at the Old Catholic Church, Shanghai. In 1902, he entered the St Berchmans School operated by the Old Catholic Church. When he was fifteen, he entered Collège Saint Ignace, Xuhui. (Note: Chinese: 徐匯公學, now known as Shanghai Xuhui High School (徐汇中学).) In 1910, after graduating from high school, he entered the Jesuit novitiate in Shanghai, but he left for a Jesuit novitiate in the United Kingdom in 1911, where he studied literature and philosophy at Jesuit institutions in Canterbury and Hastings. (Note: Fu Keyong did not mention Hastings in his 1996 article. Zhang Duomo asserted that Zhang Jiashu went back to China in 1918 before returning to Europe in 1920.) He began to study theology in Jersey in 1920. After he was ordained in October 1923, he first carried pastoral work among the Chinese diasporas in Paris and Lyon. He returned to China in October 1925, when he was 33 years old.

During this period, Zhang witnessed events which he attributed to the development of his view that China and the Catholic Church in China should be free from foreign influence. Zhang stated that he saw China humiliated by foreign powers. He experienced anti-Chinese prejudice while studying in England. When Chinese workers were massacred in Shanghai in May 1925, he recalled his foreign spiritual director stating that the workers were to blame. Later as the head of a middle school, he stated that the children were not allowed to exhibit patriotism.

After Zhang returned to China, he was appointed as the assistant rector of Our Lady of the Holy Rosary Church, Pudong for a year. Then, from 1926 to 1943, he worked at Collège Saint Ignace as a supervisor, the dean of studies, and eventually the principal. During this time he changed his name to Zhang Jiashu. After 1943, he was appointed to Sacred Heart Church, Zhangjialou, and St. Aloysius Gonzaga Church, Jiaozhou Road. In the late 1940s, he worked at Gonzaga College.

In 1949, fearing the imminent CCP takeover, the provincial superior of the Jesuit Province of Jingxian, Franz Burckhardt, instructed Zhang and Lian Guobang to send the sisters of the Congregation of Notre Dame to Macau. After the CCP occupied Shanghai, they appropriated many properties of the Catholic Church in the city. In this context, Bishop Ignatius Kung Pin-mei and Fernand Lacretelle reorganized the leadership within the diocese, and Zhang was appointed the rector of Sacred Heart Church, Hongkou, with Wu Yingfeng being the assistant rector.

=== CCPA, consecration, and Cultural Revolution (1955–1966) ===
We thank Divine Providence that the People's Government has taken effective measures to save our church in Shanghai from Kung's road to destruction.

— Members of the Clergy of the Catholic Church in Shanghai, "A Letter to Clergy and Congregation"
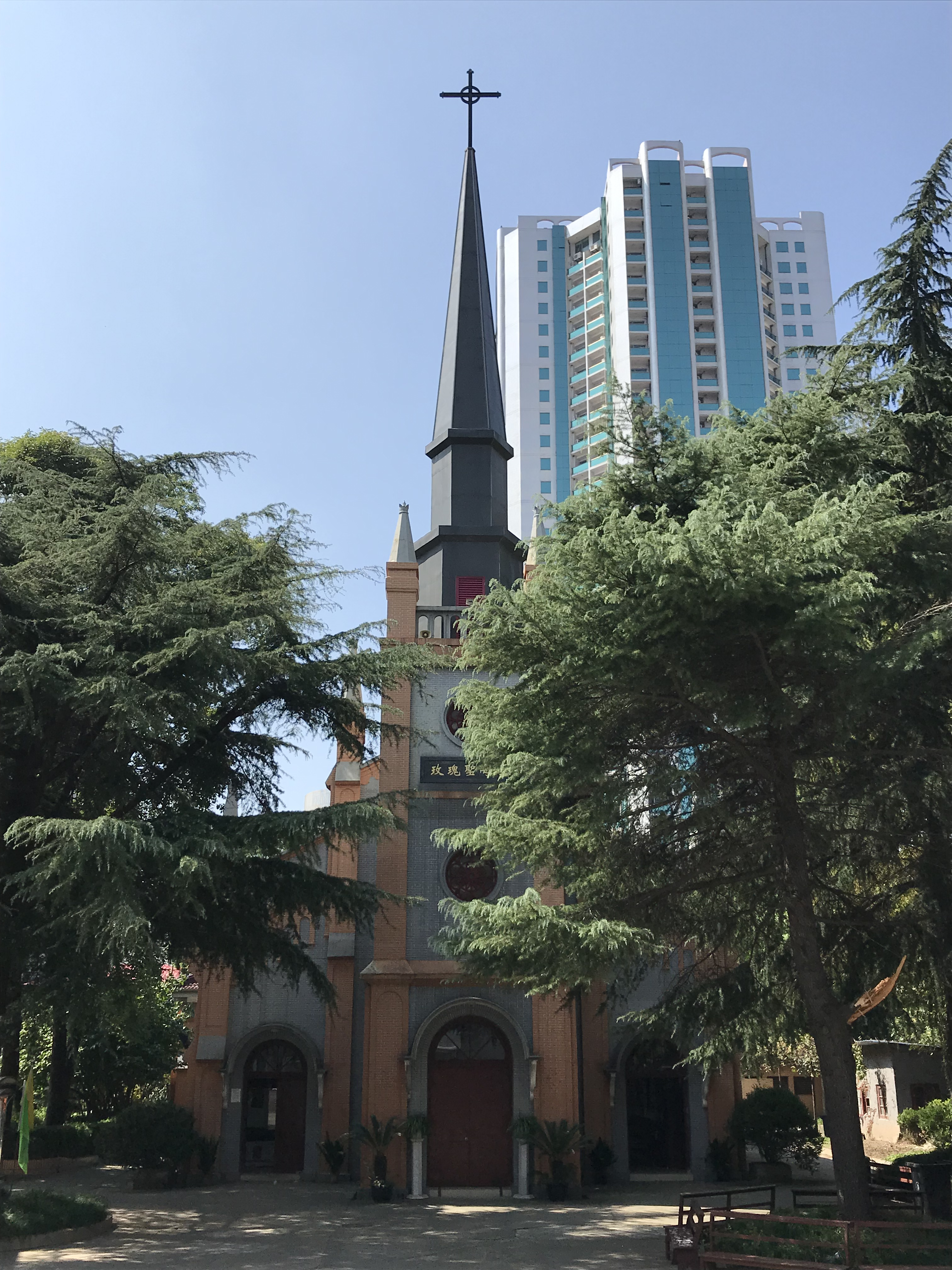
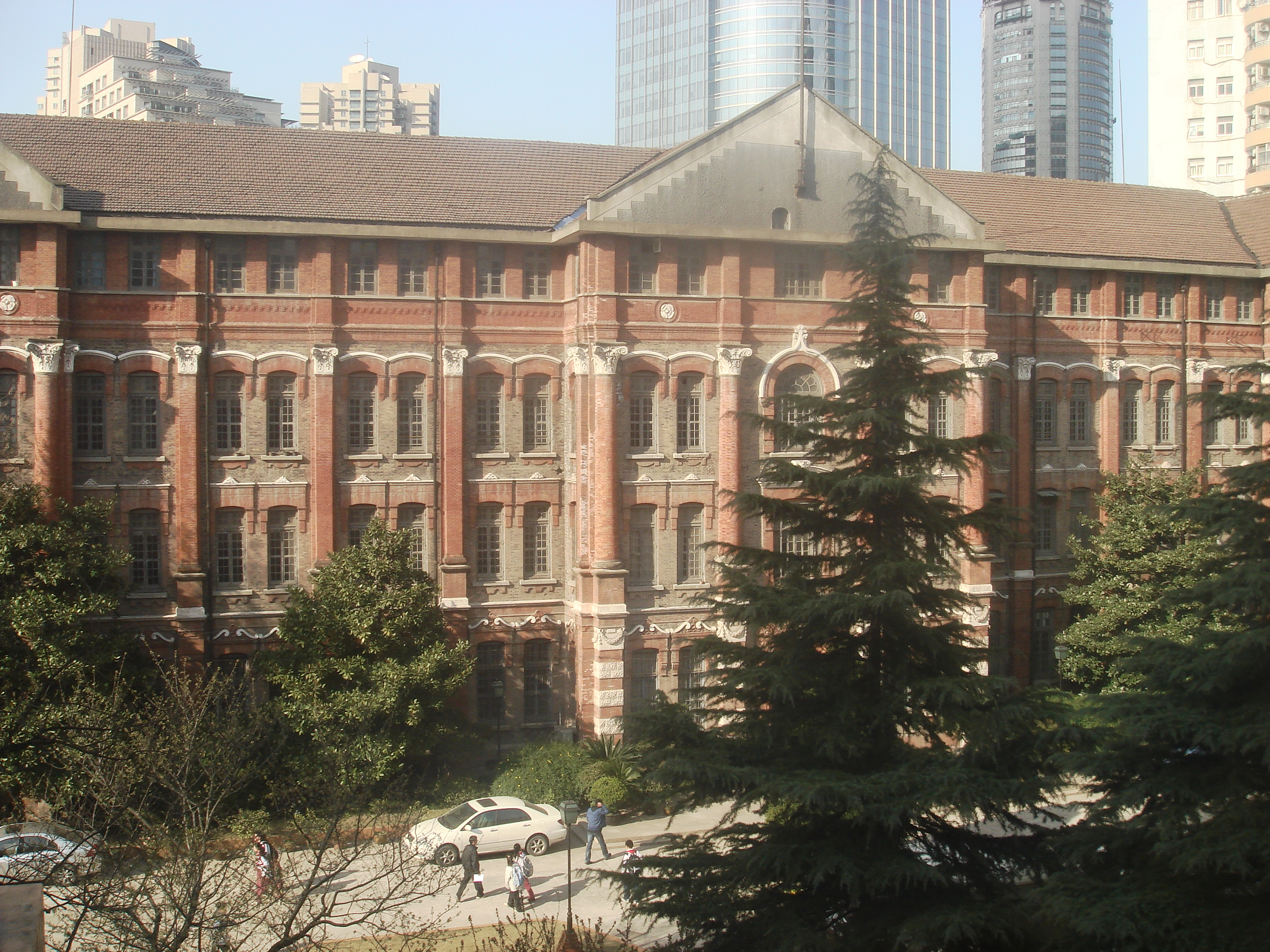
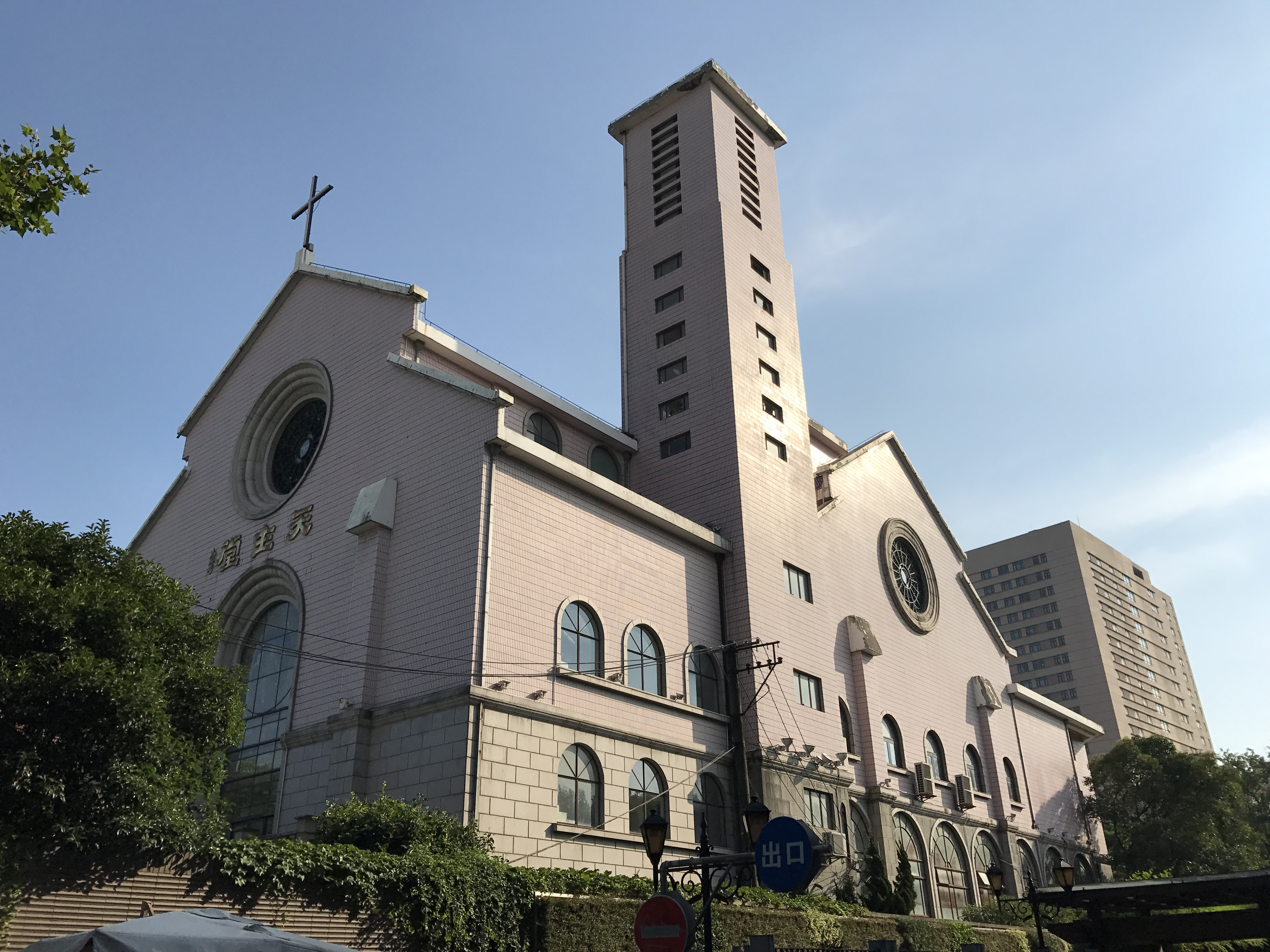
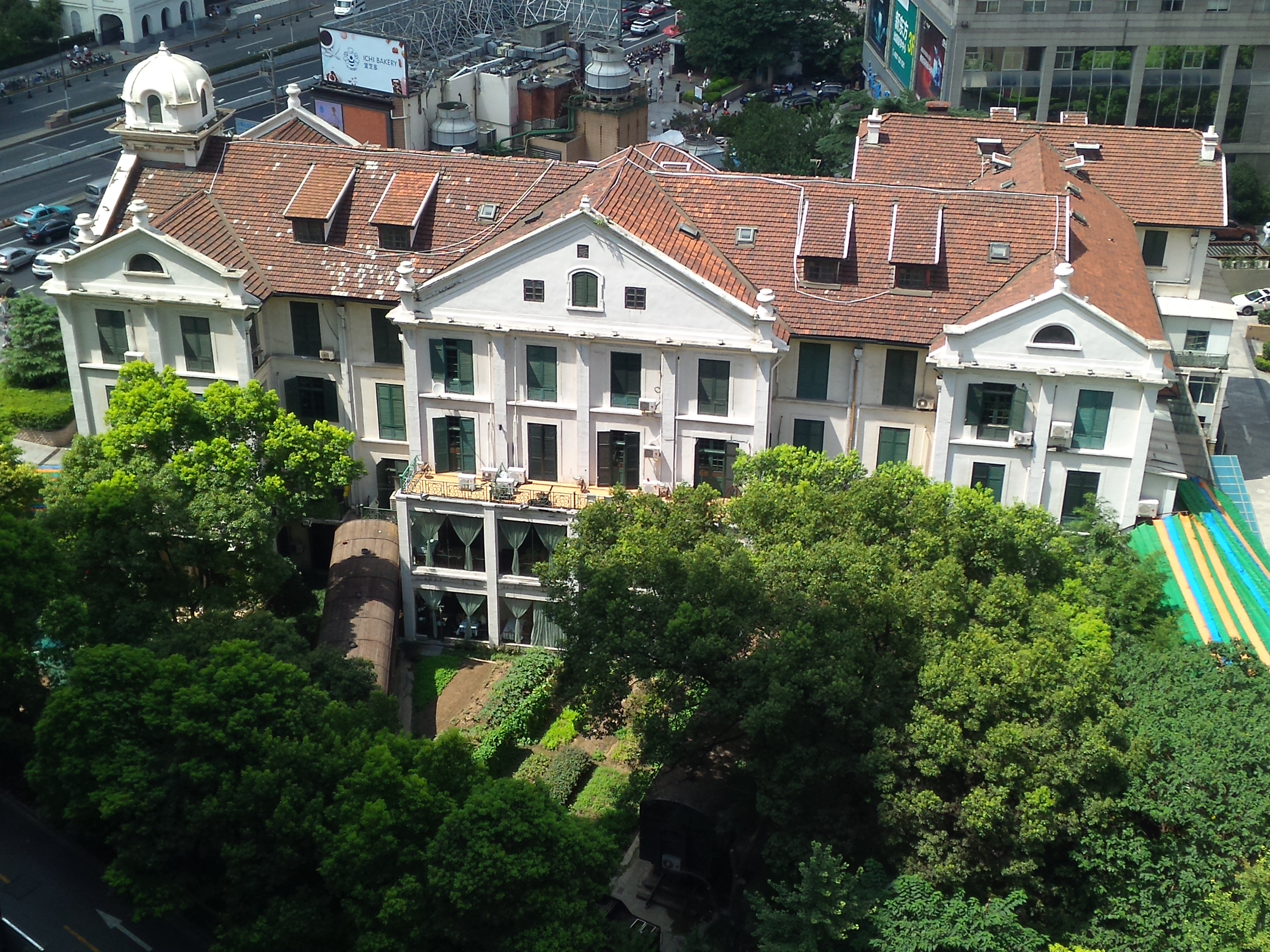
Before his consecration, Zhang worked at various locations in Shanghai: Our Lady of the Holy Rosary Church, Pudong, Collège Saint Ignace, Xuhui, Saint Peter's Church, Shanghai, and Xujiahui Seminary (left to right, top to bottom).

On 8 September 1955, Bishop Kung was arrested under the charges of being a counter-revolutionary and committing treason. After the arrest, Zhang was a leading figure to proclaim his support for the Chinese Communist Party (CCP) and the arrest of Kung. Later in 1955, about 70 priests of the Diocese of Shanghai published "A Letter to Clergy and Congregation" (《告神长教友书》), which supported the CCP and the government's response to Kung's counter-revolutionary and treasonous group. Zhang was one of the signatories.

Also in 1955, Zhang was invited to attended the Chinese People's Political Consultative Congress.

In March 1956, when a council of priests elected Francis Xavier Zhang Shilang as the acting bishop of the Shanghai, Zhang supported the election. The council then sent a telegram to the Vatican seeking approval for their action, but the Holy See did not recognize Zhang Shilang, and affirmed Kung's episcopate instead. In March 1958, the clergy members of the Archdiocese of Hankou and the Diocese of Wuchang elected Bernardine Dong Guangqing and Yuan Wenhua as bishops respectively. Zhang led a delegation from Shanghai to Wuhan to congratulate the elections.

Meanwhile, from 1956 to 1957, a series of conferences were held in Beijing to prepare the establishment of the Chinese Catholic Patriotic Association (CCPA). Zhang Jiashu was one of the representatives from Shanghai at the February 1957 conference. The CCPA was established on 2 August 1957, headed by John Li Weiguang. Zhang was also elected as a member of the standing committee of CCPA. According to Paul P. Mariani, around 1957, the Shanghai Religious Affairs Bureau was planning to elect Zhang Jiashu and Zhang Shiliang as Shanghai CCPA leaders.

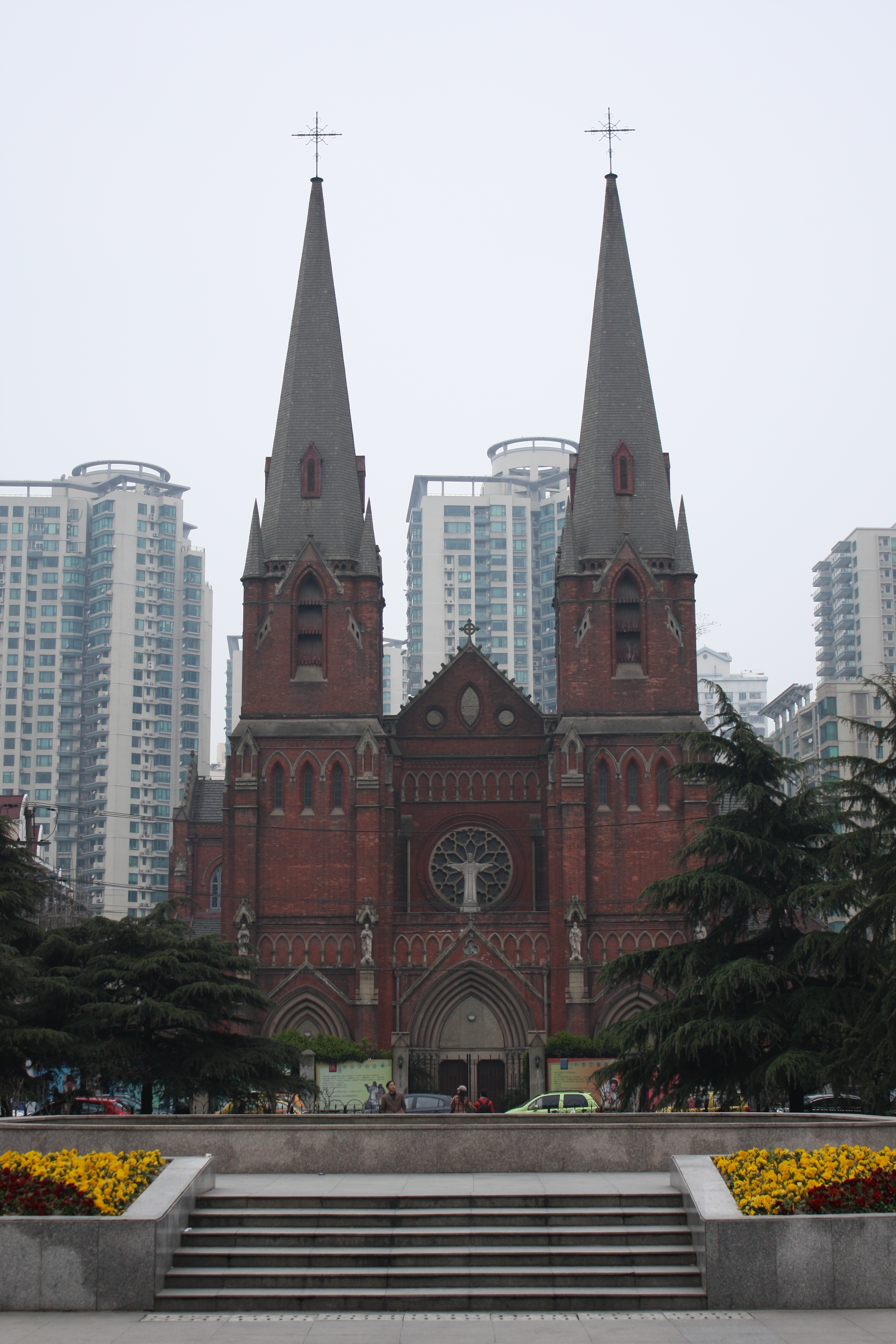
In 1960, Zhang was consecrated bishop of Shanghai without Vatican approval at St. Ignatius Church, Xujiahui (pictured), which became the cathedral of the diocese since then.

From 30 March to 10 April 1960, Zhang observed the 2nd National People's Congress in Beijing along with other clergy members and laymen. They again denounced Kung Pin-mei and accepted the leadership of the CCP.

Around this time, Zhang served first as the rector of Saint Peter's Church, Shanghai, and then as the acting rector of Xujiahui Seminary. In April 1960, the Shanghai CPA elected Zhang as the bishop of the Diocese of Shanghai. On the 26th of the month, Zhang was consecrated bishop under the self-election, self-consecration principle by Archbishop Ignatius Pi Shushi and Bishop Francis Xavier Zhao Zhensheng, along with Matthias Wu Guohuan, Shu Qishei (舒其谁), and Fang Zhigang (方志刚). The ceremony happened at St. Ignatius Church, Xujiahui, which became the cathedral of the Diocese of Shanghai since then. According to Mariani, Rome denounced Zhang's consecration. Zhang was also elected as the vice chair of the Shanghai CPA, subordinate to the chairman Hu Wenyao. In summer 1960, Zhang told an Italian journalist that he and Rome were not in touch with each other. According to Zhang's successor Aloysius Jin Luxian, during this period of Zhang's episcopate, he could only write dossiers to explain his own background or expose other people politically.

After the Cultural Revolution began in 1966, Zhang was sent down to work at a factory, where he fixed umbrellas and washed glass bottles. When the Red Guards led by Kuai Dafu attacked and damaged St. Ignatius Cathedral, Xujiahui, they put the priests and nuns through struggle sessions, and forced them to desecrate statues of saints and crosses. In particular, they demanded Zhang to step on a cross and yell "Down with God." There are different accounts on Zhang's response to the humiliation: according to Zhang Duomo, Zhang Jiashu knelt in front of the icons instead. Another account states that Zhang responded, "You may kill me but I will never renounce my faith."

=== Later years (1978–1988) ===
Zhang received political rehabilitation in 1978. He donated his compensation to restore the St. Ignatius Cathedral, to prepare for a seminary in Sheshan, and donated the rest to the China Disabled Persons' Federation. He became a delegate to the 5th National People's Congress and a member of the Standing Committee of the 5th Chinese People's Political Consultative Conference (CPPCC). In May 1978, he met with Angelo S. Lazzarotto, an Italian Catholic priest, in Shanghai, during which he mentioned that he had not ordained any new priests in Shanghai, and did not know how many other bishops are there in China at the time. Lazzarotto mentioned in Latin that the Pope thought of Zhang and prayed for him, and Zhang expressed his gratitude.

In December 1979, Zhang assisted in the consecration of Michael Fu Tieshan by Michael Yang Gaojian, despite that the Holy See did not approve the election and consecration of Fu. At the CCPA conference in May 1980, Zhang was elected to be the inaugural president of the Bishops' Conference of Catholic Church in China and the inaugural chair of the Chinese Catholic Church Affairs Committee (中国天主教教务委员会). During the conference, Zhang voiced critical opinions of the Vatican. He was also named the first vice president of the CCPA.

Meanwhile, the Chinese priest Zhu Hongsheng was arrested in November 1981. Governmental sources accused Zhu of organizing a riot at Sheshan Basilica in March 1980, while Amnesty International noted that Zhu and other priests refused to cooperate with the CCPA. Zhang opposed Zhu and other non-governmental priests, and said in December 1981 that they engaged in "illegal activities under the cloak of Catholicism."

After the 1981 conference of the CCPA in Beijing, Zhang discussed the founding of Sheshan Seminary with Lu Weidu and Gu Meiqing (顾梅青). They decided to first utilise the buildings surrounding Sheshan Basilica as the seminary's campus, and sought for Aloysius Jin Luxian's release, so he could lead the seminary. Jin was released in June 1982. On 23 June, a plenary conference including clergy members from Jiangsu, Zhejiang, Anhui, and Shanghai resolved to establish Sheshan Seminary, with Zhang as the president of the board and Jin as the rector. The seminary began its operation on 11 October 1982. In 1983, dioceses from Shandong, Jiangxi, and Fujian also joined the sponsorship of the seminary.

Zhang remained as a member of the Standing Committee of the 6th CPPCC. During the 1983 CPPCC, he and other Catholic delegates petitioned the government of Beijing to return Church of the Saviour to the Catholic Church. In the same year, Zhang received the archbishop of Canterbury, Robert Runcie, at his episcopal residence in Shanghai. On 7 October 1984, Zhang celebrated the anniversary of the reopening of Our Lady of the Rosary Church, Pudong. In the same year he appointed Stephen Li Side (李思德) and Aloysius Jin Luxian auxiliary bishops. Li and Jin were both consecrated on 27 January 1985. In March 1985, while attending the CPPCC in Beijing, Zhang met with Bishop John Baptist Wu of Hong Kong.

In July 1985, after his 30-year imprisonment, Ignatius Kung Pin-mei was released on parole and went to Shanghai to visit Zhang. After the two met, Zhang had an interview with China's official Xinhua News Agency. He said that the Diocese of Shanghai would take proper care of Kung but also had a responsibility to continue Kung's education on patriotism. He claimed that Kung pledged to follow his leadership.

In August 1986, Zhang met with Bishop Desmond Tutu at St. Ignatius Cathedral.

=== Death and legacy ===
Zhang died on 25 February 1988, and a Memorial Mass was said for him two days later at St. Ignatius Cathedral. On 27 February, the requiem high mass was celebrated by the patriotic church bishops Joseph Zong Huaide (who was also the CCPA chair) and Li Side. Zhang's body was then taken to Longhua Funeral Home, where members of the CCPA, members of the Shanghai government, and leaders of other religions in Shanghai bid farewell to his body. On 2 March, after Zhang's cremation, another Memorial Mass was celebrated at St. Ignatius Cathedral by Zong Huaide. Zhang's ashes were then interred at the cathedral. Zhang's funeral committee was headed by Zong Huaide and its highest ranking member was Xi Zhongxun. The Shanghai Committee of the Chinese People's Political Consultative Conference held a memorial service for Zhang on the same day. Deng Yingchao, Li Peng, Jiang Zemin and Xi Zhongxun sent mourning wreaths.

In addition to Bishop of Shanghai, at the time of his death, Zhang was a member of the standing committee of the 6th CPPCC, head of the Chinese Catholic Bishop's Conference, director of the Shanghai CCAC and CCPA. Zhang was succeeded as Bishop of Shanghai by Aloysius Jin Luxian. His positions in the Bishops' Conference and in the Chinese Catholic Church Affairs Committee was succeeded by Zong Huaide.

Upon the anniversary of Zhang's death in 1989, the CCPA of Taiyuan and the Archdiocese of Taiyuan hosted a panel discussion commemorating Zhang at the Immaculate Conception Cathedral, in particular his patriotism and his service to the Catholic Church. In 1993, upon Zhang's 100th anniversary, the Diocese of Shanghai and the Shanghai CCPA hosted a memorial conference. The diocese also held a memorial service for Zhang and published the book Memorial Collection of Bishop Zhang Jiashu.

Zhang's urn and memorial tablet are placed at the side altar of St. Ignatius Cathedral. He was the first bishop of the People's Republic of China era to be memorialized in this way.

== See also ==
History of Catholicism in China

- Saint Francis Xavier (1506 – 1552), Spanish Jesuit missionary who died in China
- Matteo Ricci (1552 – 1610), Italian Jesuit missionary, founding figure of the Jesuit missions in China
- Xu Guangqi (1562 – 1633), Chinese polymath and Catholic from Shanghai, namesake of the areas Xujiahui and Xuhui in Shanghai
- Luo Wenzao (c. 1610s – 1691), first Chinese Catholic bishop
- Zheng Manuo (1633 – 1673), first Chinese student in Europe and first Chinese Jesuit priest

Catholicism in early PRC

- Thomas Tien Ken-sin (1890 – 1967), Chinese Verbite priest and archbishop of Beijing, exiled from China in 1951
- Antonio Riberi (1897 – 1967), apostolic nuncio to China from 1946 to 1959, and his substitute, Tarcisio Martina (1887 – 1961)
- Beda Chang (c.1905 – 1951), Chinese Jesuit priest and martyr, died in prison
- Dominic Tang (1908 – 1995), Chinese Jesuit priest and apostolic administrator of Guangzhou, imprisoned from 1958 to 1980
- Joseph Fan Zhongliang (1918 – 2014), Chinese Jesuit priest appointed by the Holy See to be the bishop of Shanghai, imprisoned from 1955 to 1978
- Underground church, non-official Catholic alternative to churches under Catholic Patriotic Association

Protestantism in early PRC

- Wang Ming-Dao (1900 – 1991) and Watchman Nee (1903 – 1972), Chinese pastors imprisoned under the charges of being counter-revolutionary
- The Christian Manifesto, controversial political manifesto of Chinese Protestants in 1950
- Three-Self Patriotic Movement, the official supervisory organ for Protestantism in China

== Notes ==
Catholic Church titles
Preceded by Ignatius Kung Pin-mei; Francis Xavier Zhang Shilang (non-canonical)	Bishop of Shanghai (non-canonical); 1960–1988	Succeeded by Aloysius Jin Luxian
