= Beda Chang =

Chinese Jesuit priest and martyr (c.1905–1951)

Beda Chang SJ (simplified Chinese: 张伯达; traditional Chinese: 張伯達; pinyin: Zhang Boda) (c. 1905 – November 11, 1951) was a Chinese Jesuit priest. He was martyred after being tortured during a wave of persecution by the communist government.

== Biography ==
Born as Zhang Zhengming (simplified Chinese: 张正明; traditional Chinese: 張正明) to a Shanghai family which had been Catholic for many generations, he studied at St Ignatius College in Shanghai and completed his doctorate of letters in sinology at the University of Paris in 1937. He became dean of faculty of arts at Shanghai's Aurora University.

Because he refused to renounce his faith and to cooperate with the government in their persecution of the Church, Chang was arrested, imprisoned, tortured, and then died. William Aedan McGrath, in the cell opposite Chang, reported that he saw the priest languishing and vomiting in the cell for two months before he died on the morning of November 11, 1951.

== Veneration ==
Chang's body was returned to the Church the next day on November 12 and Shanghai's Catholics began to venerate him as a martyr, turning out in great numbers for a series of requiem Masses.

The government issued a statement denouncing the prayers and Masses for Chang as a "new type of bacteria warfare by the imperialists – a counterrevolutionary mental bacteria." The police guarded the grave to prevent veneration, but reports of miracles accomplished through the intercession of Chang began to be reported.

The Chinese authorities later admonished Shanghai's Catholic Bishop Ignatius Kung Pin-Mei.
