= Cardinal Kung Foundation =

US Roman Catholic organization

The Cardinal Kung Foundation is a not-for-profit Catholic organization based in Stamford, Connecticut. Founded in 1994 by Joseph Kung, nephew of the late Cardinal Ignatius Kung Pin-Mei, the foundation monitors the treatment of Catholics in China and that portion of the Catholic Church in China that remains loyal to the Pope. The foundation's primarily tool is to supply news reports to news agencies about various activities in China and has been instrumental in protecting and aiding many notable Catholics in China.

== History ==
One of the first successful efforts by Cardinal Kung Foundation to notify the media about an issue regarding China came in January 1994. In January 1994, the Cardinal Kung Foundation notified the Associated Press that Bishop Su Zhi-Ming had recently been arrested after meeting with U.S. Congressman Chris Smith in early January 1994. Su has previously spent up to 15 years in prison for his participation in the underground Catholic church. The Wichita Eagle picked up the story the following day and presented it to the readers in Wichita, Kansas.
