= Saint Peter's Church, Shanghai =

Catholic church in Shanghai, China

Coordinates: 31.2154°N 121.4653°E

- 圣伯多禄堂
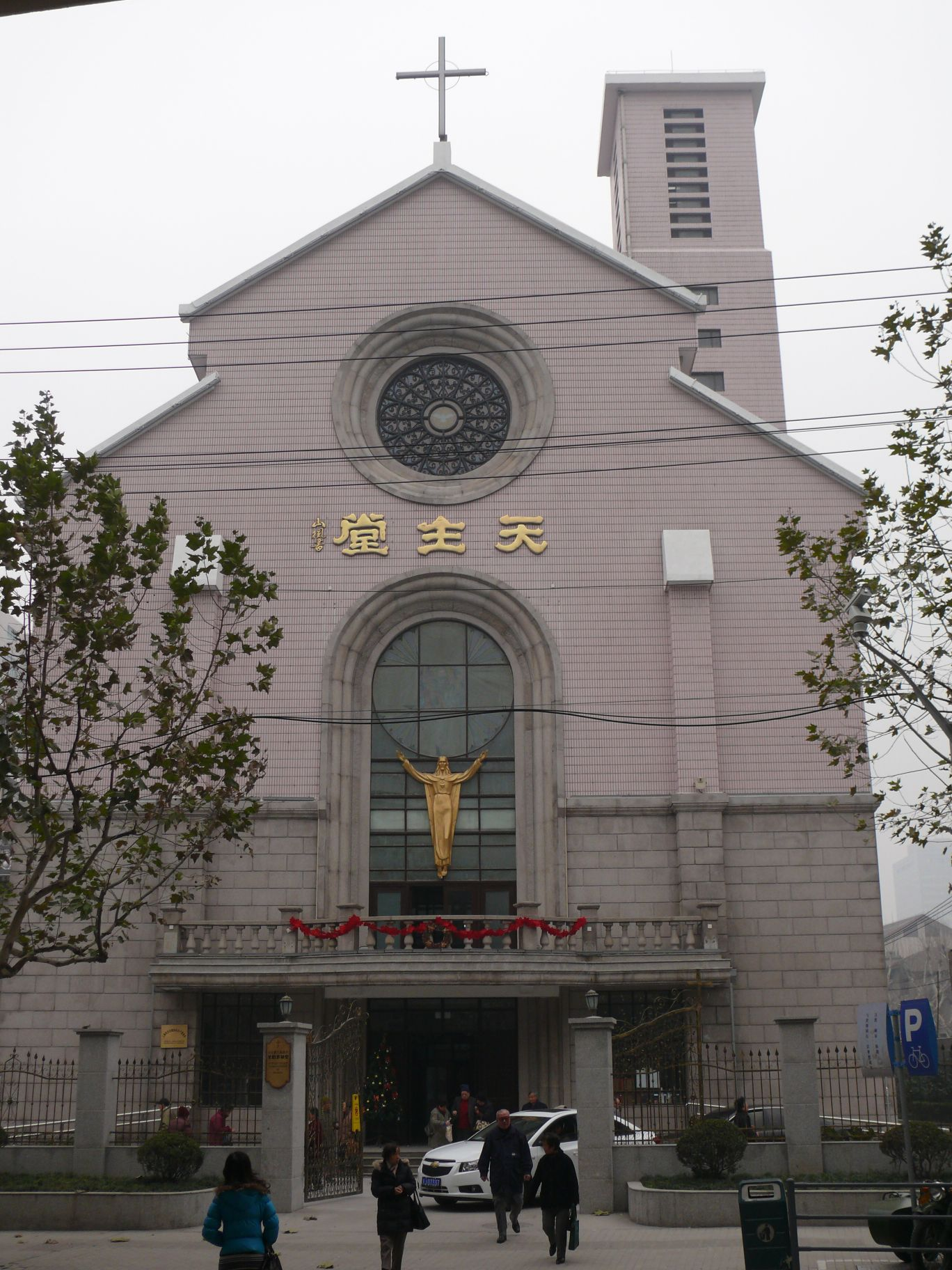
- St Peter's Church after reconstruction
- Saint Peter's Church, Shanghai
- Location: 270 Chongqing Road, Huangpu District, Shanghai
- Country: China
- Denomination: Catholic Church

Architecture
- Style: Byzantine architecture
- Groundbreaking: 1933
- Demolished: 1995 (old church)

Administration
- Diocese: Shanghai

St Peter's Church (simplified Chinese: 圣伯多禄堂; traditional Chinese: 聖伯多祿堂; pinyin: Shèng bóduōlù táng) is a Catholic church in Huangpu District (formerly Luwan District), Shanghai.

== History ==
The first church to be built on this site was built in 1933 for the students of Aurora University. This church was in the Byzantine style with a central dome and five chapels. During the Sino-Japanese war, many parishioners found refuge in the international settlements and so the number of faithful attending reached three thousand. During the cultural revolution, this church was confiscated and became a cultural centre. A little space was dedicated to religious ceremonies after 1984 and finally the construction of an expressway just in front of the building drove the cultural centre to move and return the building to the diocese.

The building was razed to build a modern one with very colourful stained-glass windows in 1995. The church is on the third floor of the building with chapels on the second floor.

== Location ==
The church is located on 270 Chongqing Road, near the Xintiandi Metro station, exit 6.

== Gallery ==
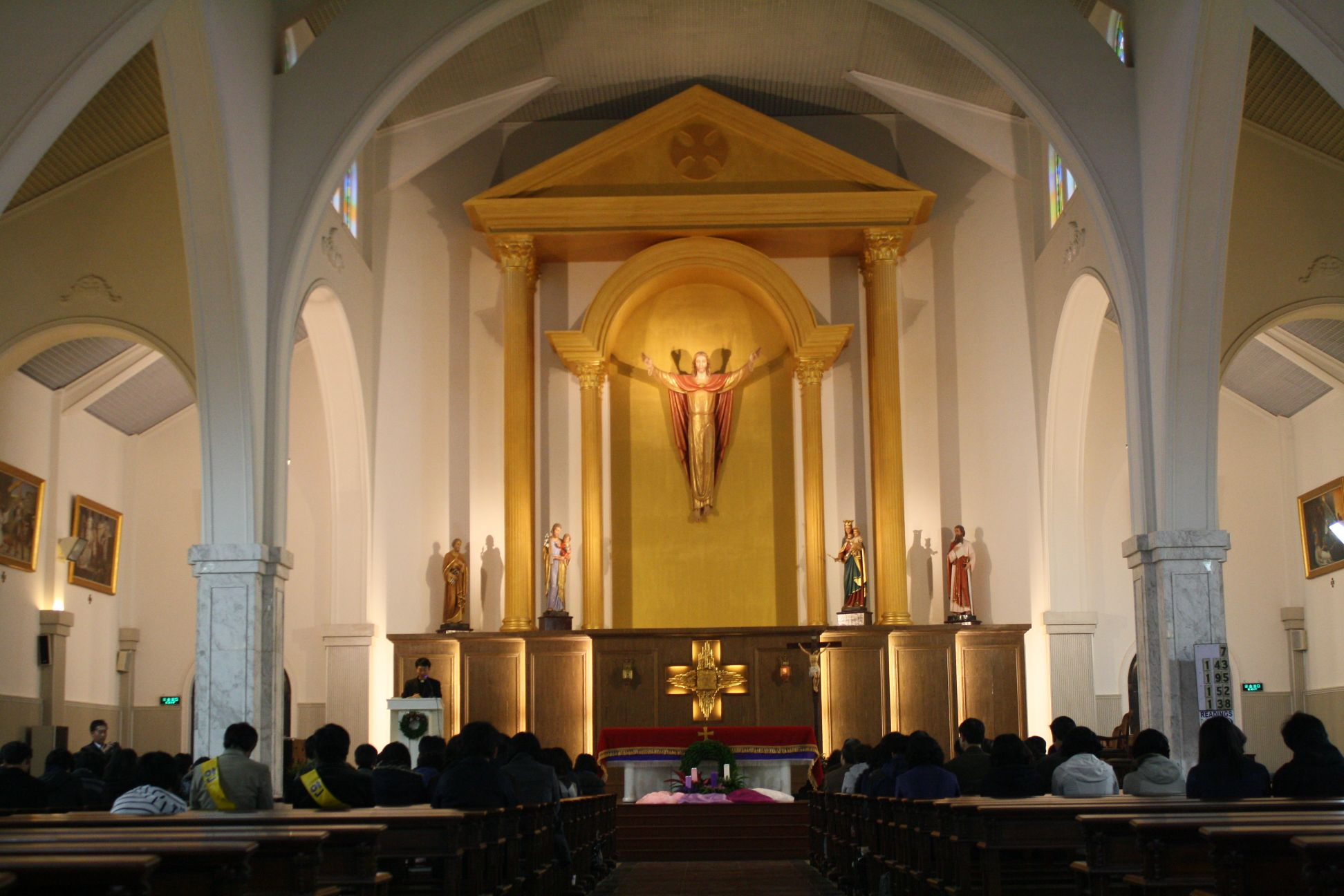
Interior view

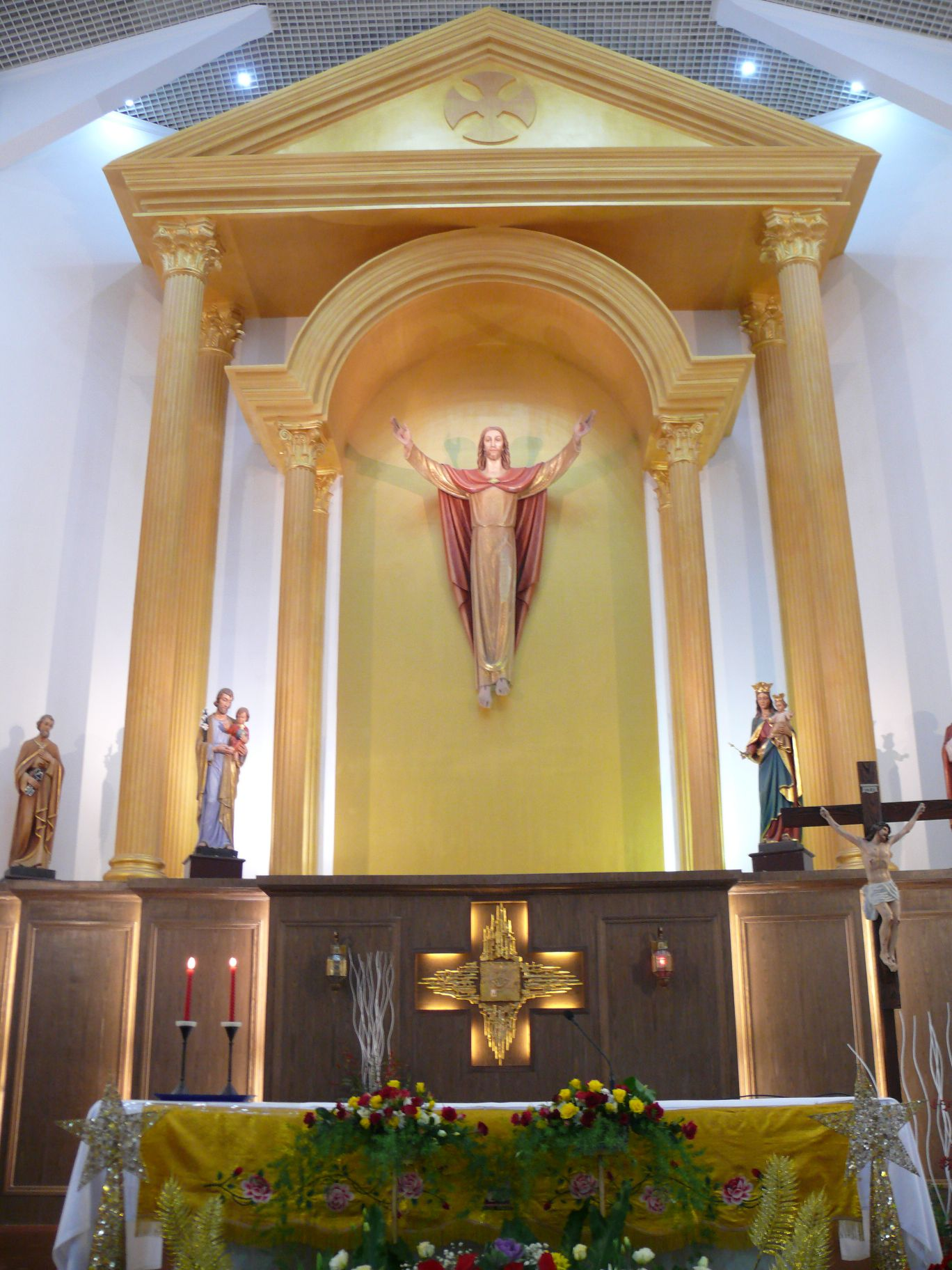
Chancel
