= Aloysius Jin Luxian =

Chinese Catholic prelate (1916–2013)

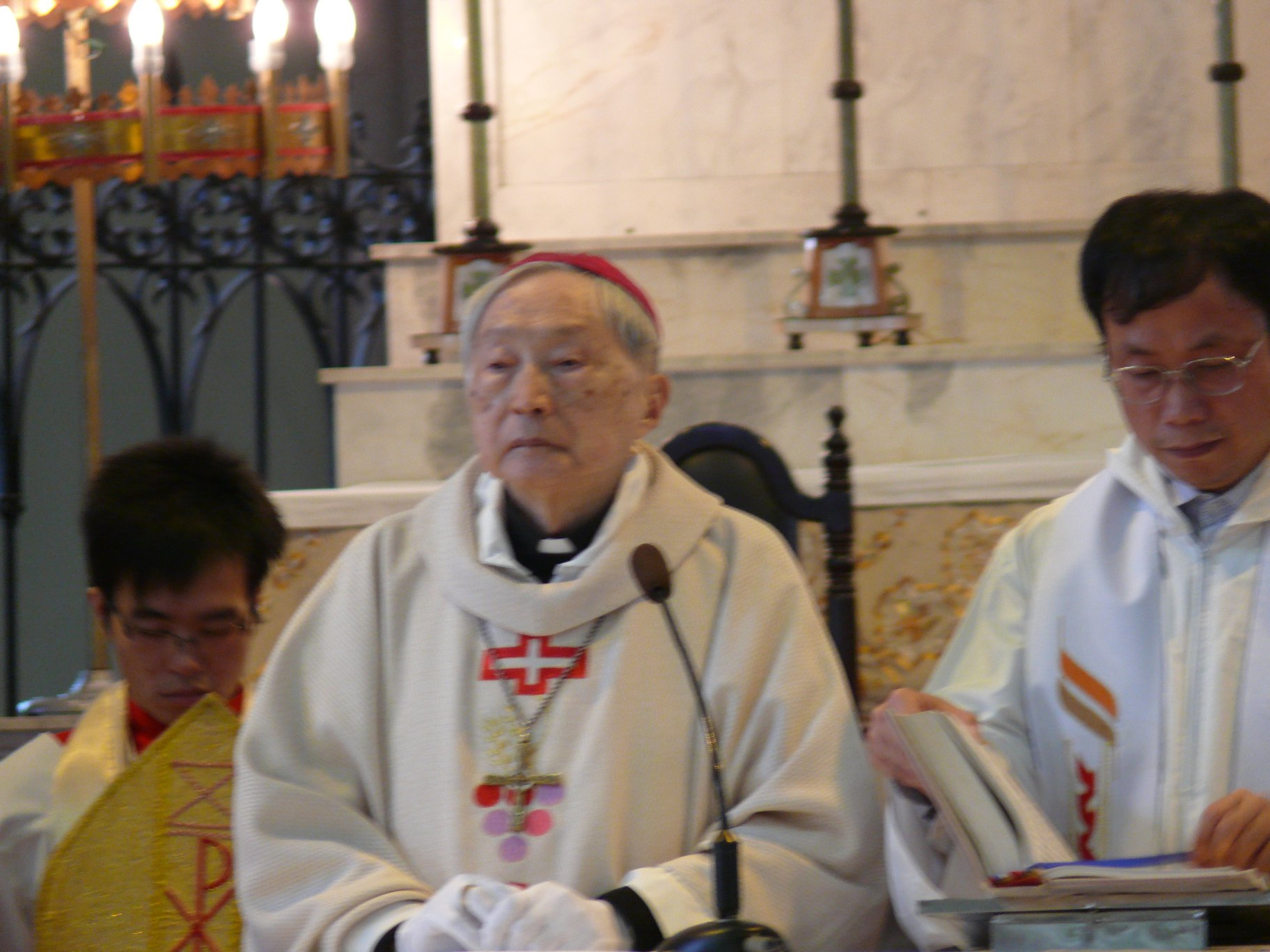
Aloysius Jin Luxian in Shanghai in 2009.

Coat of Arms of Bishop Aloysius Jin Luxian

Aloysius Jin Luxian, SJ (simplified Chinese: 金鲁贤; traditional Chinese: 金魯賢; pinyin: Jīn Lǔxián; June 20, 1916 – April 27, 2013) was a Chinese Catholic prelate who served as Bishop of Shanghai.

== Biography ==
Jin was born in 1916 into a family that had been Catholic for generations. The family lived in the southern part of Shanghai. Jin's father was a businessman. Jin described his father as a man who was generous but distant and rarely spoke to the children of the family.

Jin attended the prestigious St. Ignatius High School, run by the Jesuits.

Jin's mother died when Jin was ten. His father became more distant and died four years later. After the death of the parents, relatives took advantage of the family's finances. One of Jin's great uncles paid for him to continue his schooling and Jin entered minor seminary in fall 1932. Two years later, Jin's sister died and his brother went missing.

Jin entered the major seminary and taught at St. Ignatius. During this period, Japan began the full-scale invasion of China and the Second-Sino Japanese War. Jin believed the attitude of many superiors was not supportive of China. As a seminarian, he had witnessed a fellow seminarian being disciplined for flying a Chinese flag after the Japanese first attacked Shanghai. Academic Paul Philip Mariani writes that these experiences contributed to Jin's sense of Chinese nationalism.

In 1938, Jin entered the Jesuits and was ordained a priest in 1945. He lived under the Japanese occupation of Shanghai for much of this period. After the defeat of Japan and resumption of the Chinese Civil War, Jin was sent to a rural parish in an active combat zone. Jin observed what he deemed as the corruption of the Nationalist government.

In June 1947, Jin's superiors directed him to go to France for his final year of Jesuit training (the tertianship). In France, Jin was exposed to progressive movements in the Catholic Church, including the worker-priest movement which sought to rebuild the proletariat's trust in the church by having priests work in factories.

From 1948 to 1950, Jin studied at Gregorian University in Rome, where he wrote his thesis The Revelation and the Unity of the Father and Son in the Gospel of St. John.

He returned to Shanghai in 1951.Jin was surprised to learn that church leaders believed that the defeated Nationalists would return to mainland China with support from the United States. Jin viewed this prediction as delusional. He contended that the church should find ways to coexist with the government of the People's Republic of China. Church leaders in China reprimanded Jin for his views and blocked him from becoming the rector of a seminary.

He was arrested with his bishop and dozens of clergy and laity in 1955, during major crackdown against the counterrevolutionary clique of Ignatius Kung Pin-mei of Shanghai. Shortly after his arrest, he began to cooperate with the Chinese government. Jin provided information about the church's resistance to government policies and accused Kung and others. In a 2006 interview, Jin explained these actions by pointing out that his Jesuit superior Fernand Lacretelle had already provided a lengthy confession and that Jin felt that the damage had already been done. Jin's trial was held in 1960 and he was sentenced to 18 years in prison. The verdict stated that Jin did not deny his role and had revealed activities to mobilise the church against the government.

The government incarcerated Jin at various prisons and labor camps, including Qincheng Prison. The Chinese government had Jin work periodically as a translator. Incarcerated during the Cultural Revolution, Jin worked with political figures who would later become politically rehabilitated after the end of the Cultural Revolution.

He was released from prison in 1982 and became the founding rector of the Sheshan Major Seminary, outside of Shanghai.

Jin was ordained bishop of Shanghai without Vatican approval in 1985. He succeeded Louis Zhang Jiashu. Jin's stance, like others in the patriotic church, was that the election of bishops by the local church was consistent with ancient church practice through which election by clergy and people of the diocese was common. As bishop, he focused on bringing the doctrine of the Patriotic Catholic Church in China in line with doctrine, ecclesiology, and liturgy of the Catholic Church. For example, China had been one of the few countries post-Vatican II where seminarians were trained on the Latin mass, and Jin focused on seminarians training in the new rite and in the vernacular. Jin celebrated the first Chinese mass in the Sheshan Major Seminary on 30 September 1989. Jin also oversaw the renovating and building of churches in the modern style.

For decades, Jin did not seek a papal pardon or reconciliation with the Vatican, contending that doing so would compromise his ability to work with the Chinese government. In 2006, he indicated his submission to papal authority privately, the Holy See recognized him as Apostolic Administrator to bishop Msgr. Joseph Fan Zhongliang.

Jin died in 2013.

== Views ==
Evaluating the historical legacy of the Chinese rites controversy, Jin contended that the Catholic Church had blundered because a "Catholic who followed the prohibition [on observing traditional rites] in order to remain a Christian could not longer consider himself to be Chinese ... Chinese Catholics now became outcasts in their own society, pariahs among their own people."

Jin's view was that the Catholic Church had made previous errors in China that made it a "western religion for the West and not for China." Jin cited the special privileges to Christian converts (a contributing factor to the Boxer Rebellion), the Catholic Church's recognition of the Japanese puppet state of Manchukuo, the Church's request that Chinese Catholics remain neutral during the Japanese invasion of China, and how slow the Church was to consecrate Chinese bishops.

Based on this view of history, Jin stated that there were three lessons for the Church in China: (1) the Church must "share the fate of the people" in order to "put down roots", (2) pastoral activity should be based on inculturation, (3) the Church "must be independent of colonial powers and must be able to exercise regional self-determination."

Jin's memoirs cover through 1982. They were published for internal church use in 2009, and published in English in 2012 by Hong Kong University Press.

== See also ==
- Catholic Patriotic Association
- Ignatius Gong Pinmei
- K. H. Ting
