= Roman Catholic Diocese of Shanghai =

Catholic diocese in China

Diocese of Shanghai Dioecesis Sciamhævensis 天 主 教 上 海 教 区
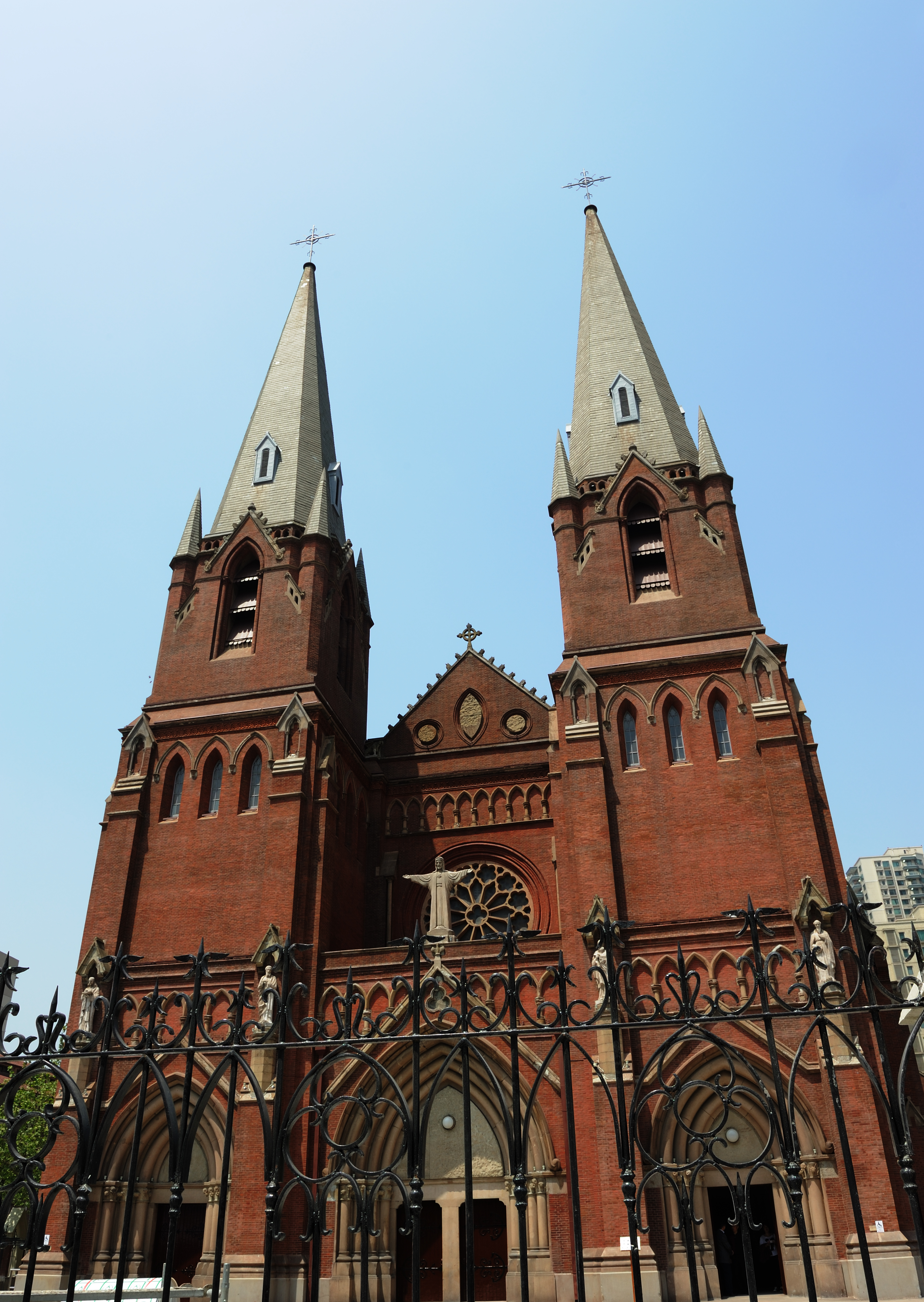
- Saint Ignatius Cathedral

Location
- Country: China
- Ecclesiastical province: Nanjing
- Metropolitan: Nanjing
- Coordinates: 31.1930°N 121.4317°E

Statistics
- Area: 10,000 km^{2} (3,900 sq mi)
- Population: Total: Statistics Missing

Information
- Denomination: Catholic Church
- Sui iuris church: Latin Church
- Rite: Roman Rite
- Cathedral: St. Ignatius Cathedral, Shanghai
- Patron saint: Our Mother of Sheshan

Current leadership
- Pope: Leo XIV
- Bishop: Joseph Shen Bin
- Metropolitan Archbishop: Francis Lu Xin-ping
- Auxiliary Bishops: Thaddeus Ma Daqin; Ignatius Wu Jian-lin
- Bishops emeritus: Joseph Xing Wen-zhi (Auxiliary, 2005-2011)

Website
- www.catholicsh.org

The Diocese of Shanghai (Latin: Dioecesis Sciamhævensis; Chinese: 天主教上海教区) is a Latin Catholic diocese in the municipality of Shanghai, China.

Pope Pius XI issued a decree Omnia Quæ Catholicæ as the Apostolic Vicariate of Shanghai on 25 April 1933.

Pope Pius XII raised the vicariate to the rank of diocese via his Pontifical decree Quotidie Nos on 11 April 1946. The same Pontiff later decreed an office for the Apostolic Nunciature via the decree Per Multas Gravesque on 6 July 1946. Today, the diocese is a suffragan diocese of the Archdiocese of Nanking.

== Churches ==
The diocese's mother church and thus seat of its bishop is Saint Ignatius Cathedral; it also houses a minor basilica in Sheshan.

== Bishops ==
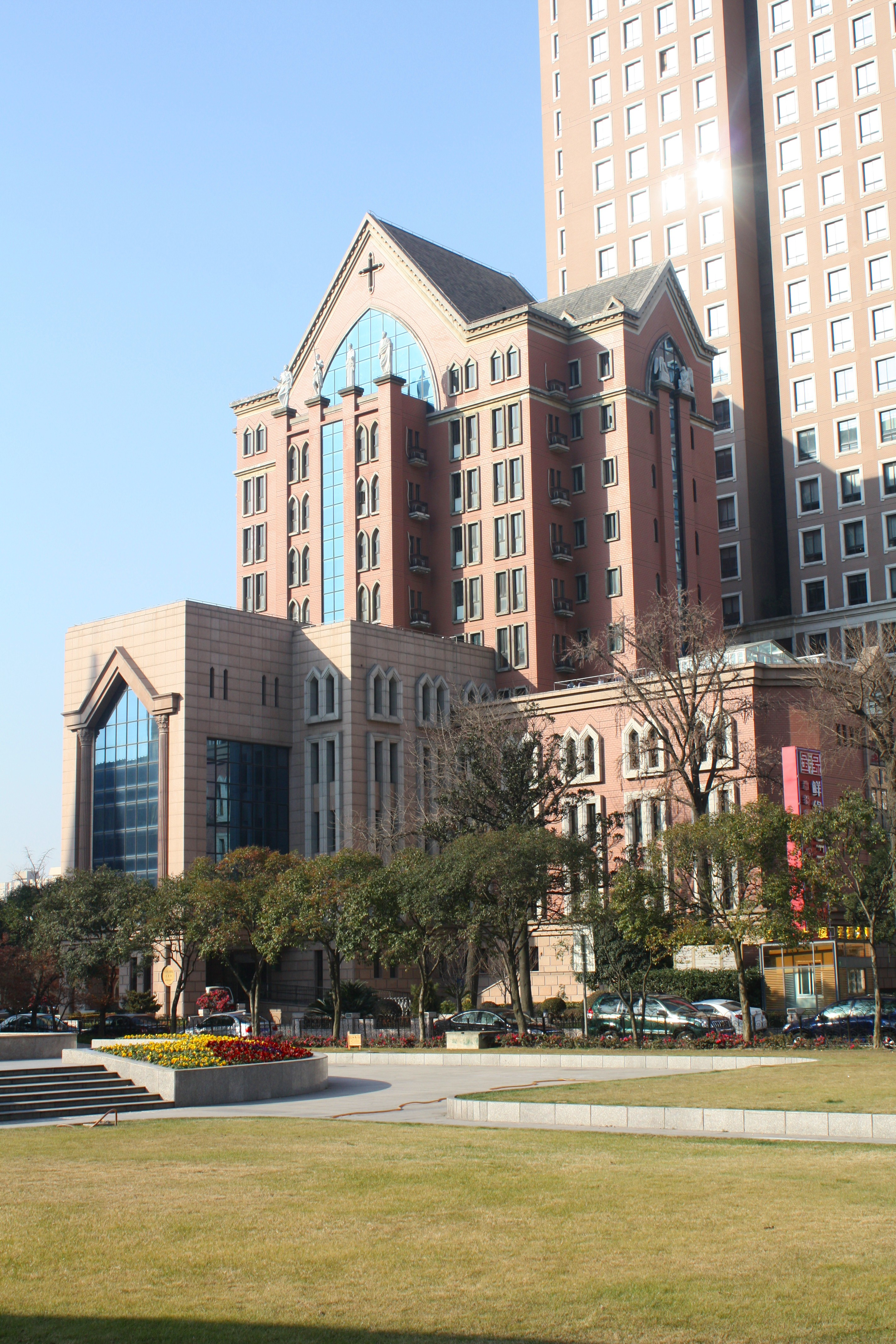
Seat of the bishop in Xujiahui.

In 1950, Pope Pius XII appointed the Bishop of Suzhou, Ignatius Kung Pin-Mei, bishop of Shanghai. In 1955, he was arrested and given a life sentence in 1960. In the same year, the Chinese Patriotic Catholic Association (CPCA) appointed Aloysius Zhang Jiashu, S.J. as Bishop of Shanghai to replace Kung, thereby being the first illicitly consecrated bishop of this diocese. In 1985, his Jesuit confrere, Aloysius Jin Luxian, S.J., was illicitly ordained as the Auxiliary Bishop of Shanghai, and became the Bishop of Shanghai upon the death of Zhang in 1988. In the meantime, Bishop Kung was released from prison and placed under house arrest in 1985 and then sent to the United States in 1988, where he would die in 2000. Bishop Kung was made a cardinal in pectore in 1979 and officially informed of his cardinalate in 1991.

Upon the death of Cardinal Kung, the Holy See recognized 82-year-old Joseph Fan Zhongliang, S.J. of the underground Church as the legitimate successor in 2000. Shortly thereafter, Bishop Jin reconciled with the Holy See and was thus recognized as the coadjutor bishop of Shanghai. In the 2000s, Bishop Jin increasingly worked with Bishop Fan in administering the diocese, despite the fact that the CPCA did not recognize the latter's authority. In 2005, Bishop Jin revealed that Fan had been suffering from Alzheimer's and both the Holy See and the CPCA agreed to the consecration of Joseph Xing Wenzhi as the Auxiliary Bishop of Shanghai in hopes that this mutually agreed upon bishop would succeed both Fan and Jin to heal the rift between the Holy See and the CPCA. However, in 2010 Auxiliary Bishop Xing asked for personal reasons not to be the successor in this diocese.

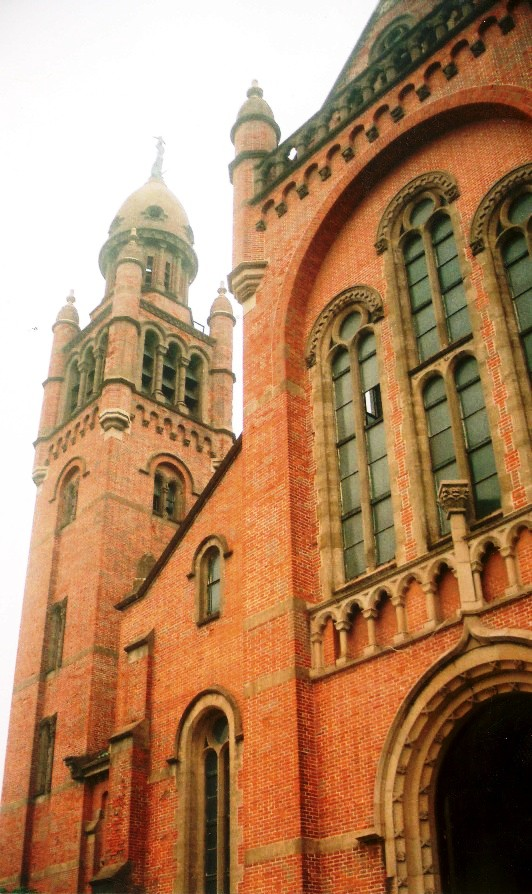
The Minor Basilica of Sheshan dedicated to the Virgin Mary, Help of Christians.

In 2012, both the Holy See and the CPCA agreed upon the consecration of 44-year-old Thaddeus Ma Daqin. There was a disagreement of his status, with the Holy See appointing him as the auxiliary bishop (given that Jin was technically still the coadjutor) while the CPCA appointed him as the coadjutor bishop. Despite this technical disagreement, it appeared that both had the intention of Ma becoming the next Bishop of Shanghai. In a surprising move, Ma announced during his ordination Mass that he would be resigning from his posts within the CPCA effective immediately. The next day, government officials placed him under house arrest at the Sheshan Seminary and the CPCA stripped him of his title as coadjutor bishop in December 2012.

On April 5, 2023, Joseph Shen Bin, Bishop of Haimen, was installed as the Bishop of Shanghai, circumventing Vatican approval. However, on July 15, 2023, the Vatican officially appointed Shen as the Bishop of Shanghai.

== List of ordinaries of Shanghai ==
See source:

- Bishop Auguste Haouissée, SJ (1933–1948)
- Cardinal Ignatius Kung Pin-Mei (1950–2000)
- Bishop Aloysius Zhang Jiashu, SJ (1960–1988) (non-canonical)
- Bishop Joseph Fan Zhongliang, SJ (2000–2014, co-adjutor 1985-2000)
  - Co-adujtor Bishop Aloysius Jin Luxian, SJ (1988–2013) (non-canonical until 2005, recognised as co-adjutor bishop in 2005 by Pope Benedict XVI)
  - Auxiliary Bishop Joseph Xing Wenzhi (2005–2011)
  - Auxiliary Bishop Thaddeus Ma Daqin (2012–present)
- Bishop Joseph Shen Bin (2023–present)
  - Auxiliary Bishop Ignatius Wu Jian-lin (2025–present)

== See also ==
- Xu Guangqi
- St. Ignatius Cathedral of Shanghai
- Christianity in China
- Catholic Church in China
- List of Catholic dioceses in China
- List of Catholic dioceses (structured_view)-Episcopal Conference of China
- Joseph Xing Wenzhi
