= Joseph Shen Bin =

Chinese prelate

His Excellency, The Most Reverend Joseph Shen Bin
- Bishop of Shanghai
- Native name: 沈斌
- Church: Catholic Church
- Diocese: Diocese of Shanghai
- Appointed: 15 July 2023
- Predecessor: Ma Daqin
- Previous post: Bishop of Haimen (2010–23)

Orders
- Ordination: 1 November 1996
- Consecration: 21 April 2010

Personal details
- Born: 23 February 1970 (age 56) Qidong, Jiangsu, China
- Motto: Adveniat Regnum Tuum ("Thy Kingdom Come")
- Coat of arms

Joseph Shen Bin (born 23 February 1970) is a Chinese Catholic prelate who has served as Bishop of Shanghai since 2023. He was Bishop of Haimen from 2010 to 2023.

== Biography ==
Joseph Shen Bin was born into a Catholic family on 23 February 1970 in Qidong, in the province of Jiangsu. He studied philosophy in Sheshan, Shanghai, and in theology in Beijing, and he was ordained a priest on 1 November 1996. He worked in the diocese of Haimen as parish vicar in Sacred Heart of Jesus parish and then as vicar general of the diocese, and then as parish priest in the parish Mother of God parish.

On 17 April 2010 he was appointed to the see of Haimen, with the consent of the Holy See and the government of the People's Republic of China (PRC). He received his episcopal consecration on 21 April in the Cathedral of Cathedral of the Good Shepherd in Haimen (Nantong).

In September 2017, he participated in a meeting organized by the Community of Sant'Egidio in the German dioceses of Münster and Osnabrück. On that occasional he told an interviewer about the relationship between the Church and the government of China:

We have understood long time ago that in China, to carry on, it is convenient not to oppose the government, and sometimes we have to (it is convenient to) distinguish between ecclesial matters, matters of faith on one side, and economic and administrative issues, which in itself do not affect the deposition of faith, on another side.... The Gospel does not ask us to assume the role of antagonists of the constituted authorities. And Jesus says we must be smart as snakes and simple as doves. I believe that now, in China, dialogue and reconciliation are the most important things. Also with the government. And we must not give too much importance to the bad accusations against us coming from outside.

On 4 April 2023, Shen was installed as the Bishop of Shanghai in the Cathedral of St. Ignatius without the approval of the Holy See. The priests of the diocese were invited to attend without being told the name of their new bishop.

Pope Francis named him bishop of Shanghai on 15 July 2023. The Vatican Secretary of State, Cardinal Pietro Parolin said Francis was acceding to the government's action as a pastoral gesture for the sake of the Catholics of Shanghai and despite the fact that the government's unilateral action violated the spirit of the 2018 accord between the PRC and the Holy See. He said Francis hoped the following:

"Remedy the canonical irregularity created in Shanghai, in view of the greater good of the diocese and the fruitful exercise of the bishop’s pastoral ministry".

Since 2022, he has been president of the College of Chinese Catholic Bishops, a government-sanctioned religious group created by the State Administration for Religious Affairs of the PRC.

His immediate predecessor in Haimen, Matthew Yu Chengcai, was not recognized by the Holy See.

Catholic Church titles
Preceded by Thaddeus Ma Daqin	Bishop of Shanghai; 2023-present	Incumbent
Catholic Church titles
Preceded by Mark Yuan Wen-zai	Bishop of Haimen; 2010-2023	Vacant
