= Constitutional history of China =

The first attempts at a constitutional system in China started near the end of the Qing dynasty, which was overthrown following the 1911 Revolution. The newly-established Republic of China adopted a Provisional Constitution in 1912, which provided a parliamentary system. However, the constitution was largely ineffective as China quickly disintegrated into warlordism. In 1928, the Kuomintang unified most of China and promulgated the Provisional Constitution of the Political Tutelage Period in 1931, intended to remain in effect until the country had been pacified. In 1947, the Kuomintang adopted the Constitution of the Republic of China; however, the constitution was never extensively nor effectively implemented due to the outbreak of the Chinese Civil War.

The first constitution of the People's Republic of China was promulgated in 1954. After two intervening versions enacted in 1975 and 1978, the current Constitution was promulgated in 1982. There were significant differences between each of these versions, and the 1982 Constitution has subsequently been amended several times. In addition, changing conventions have led to significant changes in the structure of the Chinese government in the absence of changes in the text of the constitution.

== Background ==
Dynastic China adopted a constitutional system oscillating between a feudal distribution of power and a unitary autocracy. The idea of a constitutional monarchy became influential towards the end of the 19th century, inspired immediately in large parts by the precedent of the Meiji Constitution in Japan. The first attempt towards constitutionalism was during the Hundred Days' Reform (1898), but a coup d'état by conservative monarchists loyal to Empress Dowager Cixi ended this effort. The same faction, however, eventually adopted a policy of transitioning towards constitutionalism.

The Qing government attempted to develop plans for a constitution in 1908, but the dynasty was replaced by the Republic of China before implementation. That year, the Qing dynasty issued the Outline of the Constitution by Imperial Order (Qinding xianfa dagang), which was modeled on the Meiji Constitution of Japan. The first constitutional document with legal force (the "Nineteen Covenants") was not implemented until 1911, after the eruption of the 1911 Revolution, which led to the demise of the Qing dynasty the next year.

== Republic of China ==
The Republic of China was established in 1912, and subsequently governed by a series of constitutional documents or organic laws. The Provisional Covenants of 1912 established a parliamentary republic, but a series of written and unwritten changes to the constitution in the ensuing years oscillated between semi-presidential, presidential and monarchical systems of government, until the Kuomintang took power in 1928. Both the provisional covenants and later constitutional documents authored by the Kuomintang, purported to reflect Sun Yat-sen's Three Principles of the People and Western norms.

In 1913, a committee of the National Assembly prepared the "Temple of Heaven Draft Constitution" (named for where the committee convened). Based on the French model, the draft envisioned a weak president. President Yuan Shikai objected to it. Yuan dissolved the Nationalist Party and disbanded the National Assembly, ending any possibility of implementing the Temple of Heaven Draft Constitution.

On 26 January 1914, Yuan established a "constitutional compact" conference. Influenced by Yuan's views, this conference wrote a constitution which gave expansive powers to the president and nearly a life term in office. Yuan's political opponents strongly disagreed with the proposed constitution and Yuan abandoned it after proclaiming himself emperor in 1915. The draft produced by the constitutional compact conference never entered into force.

After Yuan's death in 1916, some of his political opponents attempted to revive the Provisional Constitution of 1912, but implementation failed due to the warfare and political fragmentation of China's warlord era.

In 1919, the government in Beijing promulgated a "New Parliament Draft Constitution."

During the 1920s, twelve provinces attempted to implement their own constitutions as part of efforts towards self-rule. These efforts mostly did not come to fruition, with only Hunan implementing a constitution and Zhejiang developing a constitution that was not ultimately implemented.

In 1923, Cao Kun sought to legitimize his assertion of a presidency with a draft constitution modeled after the French Republic and some elements of the United States constitution. Cao was defeated by rival warlords in the Second Zhili-Fengtian War the next year, leading the loss of his presidential claim; the 1923 draft constitution was never implemented. The government of Duan Qirui assumed power in Beijing after Cao and in 1925 also drafted a constitution.

Sun Yat-sen's government in Canton promulgated a constitution in 1924 in the name of "the fundamentals of national reconstruction." Article I stated, "The National Government's program for the reconstruction of China is based on the revolutionary principles known as the Three Principles of the People and the Five-Power constitution."

The Northern Expedition defeated the warlords and established the Nanjing government. The Nationalists did not immediately seek to promulgate a constitution, instead beginning its Program of Political Tutelage, which framed the Nationalist Party as leading the people in the exercise of their powers.

In 1928, the Nationalist government promulgated its Organic Law. In 1931, it promulgated its provisional constitution for the period beginning in 1934.

The unrecognized proto-state Chinese Soviet Republic adopted its constitution in 1931.

In 1936, the Nationalist government promulgated another draft constitution. It was sidelined after the Second Sino-Japanese War began in earnest.

In 1942, the Nationalist government enacted a new Organic Law. The next year, it issued regulations for a committee to establish constitutional government.

The first formal Constitution was enacted in 1946 and took effect in 1947, when the Nationalist government hastily declared an end to the "political tutelage" stage of Sun Yat-sen's three-stage theory of constitutional government amidst internal and external pressures. This Republic of China constitution, as amended, continues to be the constitution in effect (as amended) on Taiwan.

== People's Republic of China ==
=== Common Program (1949) ===
In 1949, the Chinese Civil War was turning decisively in favor of the Chinese Communist Party (CCP). In June, the CCP organized the Chinese People's Political Consultative Conference (CPPCC) to prepare for the establishment of a New Democracy to replace the Kuomintang-dominated Republic of China government.

The first meeting of the CPPCC opened on 21 September 1949, and was attended by the Communist Party along with eight aligned parties. The first CPPCC served in effect as a constitutional convention. The meeting approved the Common Program, which was effectively an interim Constitution, specifying the structure of the new government, and determining the name and symbols of the new state. It also elected leaders of the new central government, including Mao Zedong as Chairman of the Central People's Government. After the end of the conference, the People's Republic of China was proclaimed on 1 October 1949. The People's Republic of China functioned for the next five years under the Common Program, with a degree of democracy and inclusion that has never been seen again in Chinese government to the present day. Among the provisions of the Common Program were those guaranteeing protection of private property (Article 3), "uniting" the bourgeoisie (Article 13), and assisting private enterprise (Article 30). The first People's Government, elected in 1949, included a significant number of representatives from parties other than the CCP.

The Common Program functioned as a provisional constitution until 1954.

=== 1954 constitution ===
In accordance with the Common Program, preparations soon began for convening the first National People's Congress and the drafting of the first permanent Constitution of the People's Republic of China. On 24 December 1952, Premier Zhou Enlai moved on behalf of the CCP at the 43rd meeting of the first CPPCC Standing Committee for a resolution to draft a permanent constitution. The resolution was passed, and on 13 January 1953, the Central People's Government appointed a thirty-person drafting committee led by Mao Zedong.

Unlike with the Common Program which preceded it, the drafting process for the constitution was dominated by the Communist Party, and was almost exclusively restricted to the Politburo. In March 1954, the draft Constitution was passed to the CPPCC and discussed in a national education campaign in the spring and summer of 1954. On 20 September 1954, exactly five years after the passage of the Common Program, the first meeting of the first National People's Congress unanimously approved the new Constitution. This version has subsequently been called the "1954 Constitution".

The 1954 Constitution included a preamble and 106 articles organized into four chapters. It specified a government structure remarkably similar to the current system. Chapter Two of the 1954 Constitution set up a system of government composed of six structural parts. The only branch of government was the legislature, the National People's Congress, to which every other body and office, including the judiciary, was subordinated. The executive was composed of the President and the State Council. Sub-national government was to be composed of people's congresses and people's committees of various levels. Autonomous ethnic areas would decide on their forms of government according to the wishes of the "majority of the people" in these areas. Finally, a hierarchy of courts headed by the Supreme People's Court and the Supreme People's Procuratorate (which would investigate crimes by the government) formed the judicial system.

Chapter Three, Fundamental Rights and Duties of Citizens, guaranteed a relatively comprehensive set of human rights, but also imposed the duty to pay taxes, undertake national service, and to obey the law.

Like the subsequent versions of the Constitution, the 1954 Constitution was not entrenched. Any part of it could be amended at any time by the National People's Congress (Article 27(1)) by a special two-thirds majority (Article 29) without recourse to a referendum or other such mechanism.

The 1954 constitution defined China as a people's democratic dictatorship and a "people's democratic state". Its theoretical basis was the concept of new democracy.

The 1954 constitution was intended to be a transitional constitution, to be revised after China developed into a socialist economy.

=== 1970 draft constitution ===
However, the Chinese government functioned more or less as envisaged for only a short time. In 1957, the Anti-Rightist Movement marked the beginning of a series of political movements and purges during which the Constitution's protections against Party interference in the judiciary largely failed to be respected. These culminated in the Cultural Revolution (1966–1976), a period in which the normal operation of government virtually ceased. In 1966, President Liu Shaoqi was politically denounced, and from 1967 was placed under house arrest. After suffering two years of persecution, Liu died, unreported, in 1969, and the position of President was left unfilled. During this period, most government bodies around the country ceased operation; various levels of people's governments were replaced by Revolutionary committees. In place of the state apparatus, power passed via public denunciations and, in many cases, violent clashes.

After the 9th Party National Congress in 1969, Mao Zedong immediately began to work on a constitutional revision. A constitution draft group was established after the During the Cultural Revolution, a draft constitution passed by the Second Plenary Session of the 9th Central Committee of the Chinese Communist Party in September 1970 as the legal embodiment of Mao Zedong's theory of "continuing revolution under the dictatorship of the proletariat". Although the Draft was approved by the Central Committee on September 12 for grassroots units for discussion by the masses, it was shelved because the 4th National People's Congress failed to convene as scheduled that year. After the Lin Biao incident, it was confiscated and destroyed because it included Lin Biao's name.

=== 1975 constitution ===
In 1975, Mao Zedong and his supporters sought to formalize their power through the promulgation of a new Constitution. Under the 1975 Constitution, the office of the President (officially translated as "Chairman" during this period) was abolished, leaving Mao, as the chairman of the CCP, as the sole power center. Formal duties of the President as Head of State were to be performed by the Chairman of the National People's Congress (who was, at the time, Zhu De). The replacement of local government by Revolutionary Committees was also formalized. The Constitution was shorted to 30 articles, and the Fundamental Rights and Duties of Citizens was greatly shortened. Guarantees removed included the rights to property and privacy, freedom from political discrimination, freedom of movement, speech, and artistic freedom, among other human rights. Concurrently, the duty to pay taxes was deleted from the document. The 1975 Constitution also saw a significant shift in tone compared to the 1954 Constitution, and saw the insertion of a significant number of ideological sloganeering provisions, including the claim that the nation was guided by "Marxism–Leninism–Mao Zedong Thought".

The 1975 Constitution defined China as "a great unity of people of all nationalities led by the working class".

=== 1978 Constitution ===
Mao died in 1976, and the Gang of Four who had dominated Chinese politics were driven out of power by October 1976. The 1978 Constitution was promulgated in March 1978 under the chairmanship of Hua Guofeng. It contained 60 sections organised into four Chapters. In many ways, the 1978 Constitution was a compromise between the interim leadership's desire to consolidate power using Mao's moral authority, while responding to the popular desire to reverse the Maoist extremes of the Cultural Revolution. On the one hand, the new Constitution in many places maintained the ideological tone of the 1975 Constitution, such as in Article 16 ("State officials must diligently study Marxism, Leninism, and Mao Zedong Thought, serve the people whole-heartedly ...") and Article 19 ("The fundamental role of the Armed Forces is: [...] defending against destabilisation and invasion from Socio-Imperialism, Imperialism, and their running dogs"). At the same time, the need for "socialist democracy" was emphasized (Article 3), and the 1954 system of government was largely restored, including its significant checks on executive power.

Regarding religion, the 1978 Constitution stated, "[C]itizens enjoy freedom to believe in religion and freedom not to believe in religion and to propagate atheism."

=== 1982 constitution ===
The 1978 constitution was short-lived. In December 1978, at the 3rd plenary session of the 11th Central Committee of the Chinese Communist Party began a series of reviews and reforms that confirmed Deng Xiaoping as the new paramount leader of China, with reform-minded leaders supported by Deng filling the top echelon of government. As part of the Deng faction's political reform agenda, a fourth Constitution was promulgated on 4 December 1982. The 1982 constitution was born in a political environment where the past, including Mao's "errors" and almost all of the Communist Party's policies from 1949, were relatively objectively re-examined, and the country's future, including the pursuit of market-driven economic reforms, was being openly debated. As a result, the 1982 Constitution returned the government structure to broadly that set up in 1954, with the Presidency restored. The Fundamental Rights and Duties of Citizens were greatly expanded, and elevated to Chapter Two, ahead of the provisions for the structure of the government. The 1982 Constitution was subsequently amended in 1988, 1993, 1999, 2004 and 2018, generally modifying the Constitution in accordance with economic and political reforms over that period. The current compilation dates from 11 March 2018.

The system of government set up under the 1982 Constitution has undergone some changes, largely due to the evolution of Constitutional conventions rather than textual amendments. The most significant of these occurred in 1989. As drafted, the 1982 Constitution contemplated that the power of the state would be distributed between the general secretary of the Chinese Communist Party, the premier of the State Council, and the chairman of the Central Military Commission. The President, as nominal head of state, would be a symbolic role with little substantive power. Such was the arrangement until 1989. Deng Xiaoping, also the Chairman of Central Military Commission, used his formal powers during the 1989 Tiananmen Square protests and massacre to deploy troops to Beijing in support of the state of emergency declared by Premier Li Peng, and colluded in the subsequent violent crackdown in Beijing, against the wishes of Zhao Ziyang, the General Secretary of the Communist Party, who advocated negotiation with the student protestors. In a reaction against the conflict between the independent power centers, at the expiration of Deng's term, the new paramount leader, Jiang Zemin, after he became General Secretary of the Chinese Communist Party, would later take on the positions of the Chairman of the Central Military Commission and of President of the People's Republic as well, effectively ending the relative separation of party and state that had prevailed since Hua Guofeng faded into political obscurity.

In 2004 the constitution was amended to state that China "encourages, supports, and guides the development" of the private sector "in accordance with law, exercises supervision and control." The constitutional revisions stated that "citizens' lawful private property is inviolable," which was the first time in PRC history that private property rights received constitutional guarantees.

The Constitution was amended on 11 March 2018. It includes an assortment of revisions that further enforce the CCP's control and supremacy, and removing term limits for both the President and Vice President, enabling Xi Jinping to remain president indefinitely. Xi is also the general secretary of the CCP, the de facto highest position in the country, with no term limit.

== See also ==
- History of the People's Republic of China
