= In pectore =

Latin phrase used by the Catholic Church

In pectore (Latin for 'in the breast/heart') is a term used in the Catholic Church for an action, decision, or document intended to be kept secret. It is most often used when there is a papal appointment to the College of Cardinals without a public announcement; the pope keeps the name of that cardinal to himself. The Italian-language version of the phrase—in petto—is sometimes used. When the name of a new cardinal is announced or made public, it is sometimes said to be published.

Since the practice arose in the 16th century its use has varied greatly. Some popes have used it rarely or not at all, while others have used it regularly. In the first half of the 19th century, Pope Gregory XVI appointed half of his 75 cardinals in pectore and left several unidentified at his death.

== Background ==
Since the 15th century, popes have made in pectore appointments to manage complex relations among factions within the Church, when publication of a new cardinal's name might provoke persecution of the individual or of a Christian community or, when the identity of the new cardinal is an open secret, to signal defiance of government opposition or stake out a diplomatic or moral position. Over the centuries, popes have made in pectore appointments in consideration of government and political relations in a wide variety of nations, from Portugal and several European states to the Soviet Union and the People's Republic of China.

Once his appointment is published, the precedence of a cardinal appointed in pectore is determined by the date of the appointment, not the announcement. This reflects the principle that he has been a cardinal from the earlier date and that membership of the College of Cardinals depends on the decision of the pope, not any ceremony or ritual. The announcement allows the cardinal to receive and wear the symbols of his office, use the titles appropriate to his rank, and to perform the functions specific to a cardinal, most importantly, if otherwise qualified, to participate in a papal conclave. Should the pope die without publishing an appointment he has made in pectore, the appointment lapses.

== History ==
In the early history of the College of Cardinals, all cardinals appointed were published as a matter of course. Under pressure to maintain a delicate network of alliances in the last years of Western Schism, beginning in 1423 Martin V withheld the names of some he created cardinals, the first in pectore appointments. (Note: Salvador Miranda, who published a compendium of information about the College of Cardinals, objects to considering these appointments in pectore because Pope Martin shared the names with the other cardinals, though the customary distinction is whether a cardinal's name has been made public, and Martin did make names public in a formal way at a later date. For example, in 1426, to meet the terms established by the Council of Constance (1414–1418), he named three French and three Italian cardinals, and four more who were English, German, Spanish, and Greek. He kept the names of four more secret, a Spaniard and three Italians, one of them his nephew, which would have been another source of contention. He published these additional names in November 1430, just three months before his death.) A century later, Pope Paul III created Girolamo Aleandro a cardinal on 22 December 1536 and published his name on 13 March 1538. Paul III later named five more cardinals in pectore, all of whose names were published within a few years. Pope Pius IV created a cardinal in pectore on 26 February 1561 and became the first to fail to publish such an appointment.

Although in pectore appointments were not uncommon in the 17th century, all such appointments were soon published until Pope Innocent XII named two cardinals in 1699 whose names were never published. On 26 April 1773, Pope Clement XIV created 11 cardinals in pectore, none of whom were published.

As anti-Catholic hostility among various governments became common, in pectore appointments became much more common during the late 18th and 19th centuries. Previously cases of unpublished in pectore appointments had only occurred when a pope died shortly after creating the cardinal, but popes began to wait much longer to publish such appointments, creating a greater likelihood that a name would remain unpublished. On 23 June 1777, Pope Pius VI created two cardinals in pectore and lived another 22 years without publishing their names. In the course of 23 years, Pope Pius VII created 12 cardinals in pectore whose names he published and none whose names went unpublished, though two others died before he published their names. Pope Leo XII made eight in pectore appointments in just six years, and all were published. When the reign of Pope Pius VIII ended unexpectedly after just 19 months, he had created six cardinals and another eight in pectore, whose appointments died with him. Pope Gregory XVI created 81 cardinals, 29 of them in pectore, of which six were unpublished.

=== Modern practice ===
The frequency of appointments in pectore declined later in the 19th century. Pope Pius IX made only five such appointments out of 123 cardinals, and all were published within four years of creation. Pope Leo XIII named only seven cardinals out of 147 in pectore and all were published. The only in pectore appointment by Pope Pius X was António Mendes Belo, Patriarch of Lisbon. The Portuguese Republic established in 1910 had adopted severely anticlerical policies. Belo's appointment was revealed on 25 May 1914, the last time Pius created cardinals three months before his death, though the Holy See did not recognize the government of Portugal until 1919. Pope Benedict XV made two in pectore appointments in 1916: one, possibly Paul von Huyn, was never published and the other was Adolf Bertram, a German bishop, whose country was at war with Italy. His name was published in December 1919 after the war ended. In 1933, Pope Pius XI created two cardinals in pectore: Federico Tedeschini, Nuncio to Spain, and Carlo Salotti, Secretary of the Sacred Congregation of Rites. They were made public in the consistory of 16 December 1935. Although several cardinals from Communist states could not attend his consistories, Pius XII was the first pope since Innocent XIII over two centuries previously to create no cardinals in pectore, but Pope John XXIII made three in pectore appointments on 28 March 1960 and never published them. (Note: One of the three is often said to be Josyf Slipyj, who was made a cardinal by Paul VI in 1965. Cardinal Gustavo Testa is cited as the source of this information.)

Pope Paul VI made four in pectore appointments. One of them, Iuliu Hossu, died without his appointment being published, though Paul revealed it a few years later. Paul made in pectore appointments of Štěpán Trochta on 28 April 1969, published 5 March 1973, and František Tomášek on 24 May 1976, published 22 June 1977. In the case of Joseph-Marie Trịnh Như Khuê, Paul made the appointment in pectore on 28 April 1976 when announcing his next consistory. When the government of Vietnam granted Trinh-Nhu-Khuê a visa to travel to Rome, Paul published the appointment as a surprise by having Trinh-Nhu-Khuê's name called as the last of twenty cardinals created at that consistory on 24 May.

Pope John Paul II named four cardinals in pectore, three of whom he later revealed: Ignatius Kung Pin-Mei, Bishop of Shanghai, People's Republic of China, appointed in pectore 30 June 1979, published 29 May 1991; Marian Jaworski, Archbishop of Lviv, Ukraine; and Jānis Pujāts of Riga, Latvia, both of whom were appointed in pectore on 21 February 1998, and published 29 January 2001. John Paul created the fourth in 2003, but never revealed the name, and the appointment expired with the pope's death. Had the name been discovered in the pope's will, the appointment would still have operated under in pectore rules, and would have been considered expired.

Neither Pope Benedict XVI nor Pope Francis named a cardinal in pectore.

=== Popes ===
Five cardinals who were later elected pope were created cardinals in pectore. In each case, publication followed closely upon their appointment. They were:

- Pope Leo X, born Giovanni di Lorenzo de' Medici, appointed in pectore 9 March 1489, published 23 March 1492 by Pope Innocent VIII
- Pope Innocent X, born Giovanni Battista Pamphili, appointed in pectore 30 August 1627, published 16 November 1629 by Pope Urban VIII
- Pope Benedict XIV, born Prospero Lorenzo Lambertini, appointed in pectore 9 December 1726, published 30 April 1728 by Pope Benedict XIII
- Pope Gregory XVI, born Bartolomeo Alberto Cappellari, appointed in pectore 21 March 1825, published 13 March 1826 by Pope Leo XII
- Pope Pius IX, born Giovanni Maria Mastai-Ferretti, appointed in pectore 23 December 1839, published 14 December 1840 by Pope Gregory XVI

== In popular culture ==
- In The Shoes of the Fisherman (1963) by Morris West, a Ukrainian, Kiril Pavlovich Lakota, arrives in Rome and is revealed to have been appointed a cardinal in pectore by the previous pope.
- In Vatican: A novel (1986) by Malachi Martin, a pope on his deathbed reveals that he had named the central character, Richard Lansing, a cardinal in pectore.
- In Father Elijah by Michael D. O'Brien, the titular character is appointed bishop in pectore and sent to his new, remote diocese in order to evade arrest for the framed murder of his friend.
- In The Secret Cardinal (2007) by Tom Grace, the pope enlists a cardinal's godson, former Navy Seal Nolan Kilkenny, to rescue a prelate named a cardinal in pectore twenty years earlier from a Chinese prison.
- In Conclave (2016) by Robert Harris, Vincent Benítez, a Filipino serving as Archbishop of Baghdad, arrives just before the start of a conclave with a document that proves he was named a cardinal in pectore by the late pope. To explain this unusual procedure, Harris has the dean of the College of Cardinals remind a cardinal that the late pope "revised the canon law on in pectore appointments shortly before he died". In the film version, this hidden cardinal is Mexican and the archbishop of Kabul.

== See also ==
- List of ecclesiastical abbreviations
- List of Latin phrases
