= Ignatius Kung Pin-Mei =

Chinese Roman Catholic cardinal

His Eminence Ignatius Pin-Mei Kung
- Cardinal, Bishop of Shanghai
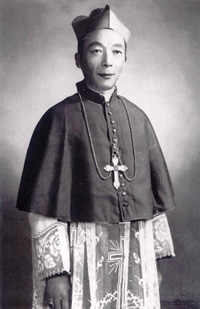
- Kung in 1949
- Diocese: Shanghai
- See: Shanghai
- Appointed: 15 July 1950
- Installed: 1950
- Term ended: 12 March 2000
- Successor: Joseph Fan Zhongliang
- Other posts: Apostolic Administrator of Soochow (1950–2000); Apostolic Administrator of Archdiocese of Nanking (1950–2000); Cardinal-Priest of San Sisto Vecchio (1991–2000)
- Previous post: Bishop of Soochow (1949–1950)

Orders
- Ordination: 28 May 1930
- Consecration: 7 October 1949 by Antonio Riberi
- Created cardinal: 30 June 1979 (in pectore); 28 June 1991 (revealed) by Pope John Paul II
- Rank: Cardinal-Priest

Personal details
- Born: Ignatius Kung Pin-Mei; 2 August 1901 Shanghai, Qing dynasty-era China
- Died: 12 March 2000 (aged 98) Stamford, Connecticut, United States of America
- Buried: Santa Clara Mission Cemetery, Santa Clara, California

Ordination history of Ignatius Kung Pin-Mei
History
Priestly ordination
- Date: 28 May 1930
Episcopal consecration
- Principal consecrator: Antonio Riberi
- Co-consecrators: James Edward Walsh; Simon Zhu Kaimin
- Date: 7 October 1949
Cardinalate
- Elevated by: Pope John Paul II
- Date: 30 June 1979 (in pectore); 28 June 1991 (published)

Styles of Ignatius Kung
- Reference style: His Eminence
- Spoken style: Your Eminence
- Religious style: Cardinal
- Informal style: Cardinal
- See: Shanghai

Ignatius Kung Pin-Mei (simplified Chinese: 龚品梅; traditional Chinese: 龔品梅; pinyin: Gōng Pǐnméi; Wade–Giles: Kung P'in-mei; 2 August 1901 – 12 March 2000) was a Chinese Catholic prelate who served as Bishop of Shanghai from 1950 until his death in 2000. He spent 30 years in prison for defying attempts by the Chinese Communist Party (CCP) to control Catholics in the country through the government-approved Chinese Catholic Patriotic Association. At the time of his death in exile in the United States, he was the oldest member of the College of Cardinals, to which he was secretly appointed by Pope John Paul II in 1979.

== Biography ==
Kung was born in 1901 into a Shanghai family with Catholic roots spreading back at least five generations. He would become a priest in 1930, Bishop of Souchou in October 1949 just after Mao Zedong drove Chiang Kai-Shek to Taiwan, and Archbishop of Shanghai on 15 July, 1950. As Archbishop during the first half of the 1950s, Kung alongside Guangzhou's Dominic Deng Yiming refused to renounce the Vatican despite the demands of and threats by Mao, to whose regime religious martyrdom had already become an embarrassment, since liturgical services became sites of anti-communist demonstration.

Declassified Chinese government documents confirm that Mao's aim was to completely destroy the Catholic Church in China, not merely to bring it into line with the regime.

On September 8, 1955, Kung, along with other Catholic clerics laity, was arrested and imprisoned as the "Kung Pin-mei counterrevolutionary clique". He was sentenced five years later to life imprisonment for counter-revolutionary activities, and replaced by Louis Zhang Jiashu, who was not approved by the Pope. When replaced by Zhang, Kung was found guilty in a public trial of

charges of cooperating in "a scheme of US imperialists and the Vatican to subvert the Chinese people's democratic regime".

In 1979, Kung appealed his sentence. Kung wrote that he had previously been reticent to appeal because he did not wish to bring up old matters, but that since Spring of 1979, "officials have come many times to re-examine cases and to announce that unjust verdicts could be appealed." Kung contended that the reason for his arrest was his opposition to the Three-Self Patriotic Movement, including his statement that those who joined the movement (or joined the CCP or the Communist Youth League) could not receive the sacraments. Kung wrote that because religious freedom was guaranteed by the Constitution of China, he could not be charged with his opposition to the Three-Self Patriotic Movement, and therefore authorities had falsely charged him with participating in a counterrevolutionary group. The appeal failed.

Kung was secretly named a Cardinal in pectore in the consistory of 1979 by Pope John Paul II. When that consistory occurred the press almost generally believed Kung was the in pectore cardinal.

Kung was released from prison per article 73 of the penal code, which stated that people with life sentences could be rehabilitated if they had served at least ten years of their sentence and had demonstrated repentance. Kung was released to the care of the patriotic church. In a speech to Catholics the next afternoon at Bishop Zhang's residence, Kung stated:

You have got into trouble because of me and have suffered a lot. I hope you will all forgive me ... From now on, I must observe the commandments and love the Church, observe the law and love my country, and serve the Four Modernizations of the fatherland as long as I am alive. I am already advanced in years. What little I can do, I think God will have his plan. I will follow the arrangements made by the government and the bishop. In sum, I hope you will all please forgive me."

After he was released in 1986, Kung was kept under house arrest until 1988. In 1988, the authorities ended Kung's parole and restored his political rights. Under the escort of his nephew Joseph Kung, Ignatius left China for medical treatment and settled in the United States. According to academic Paul P. Mariani, statements by Kung after this point were likely filtered by Kung's nephew. In his first interview after being exiled, Kung highlighted how there was no freedom of religion in China.

Kung learned he was a cardinal during a private meeting with the Pope in the Vatican in 1989, and his membership in the College of Cardinals was made public in 1991. His titular church was the old basilica of St. Sixtus.

Kung died in 2000, aged 98, from stomach cancer in Stamford, Connecticut. His funeral was held at St. John the Evangelist Church (now the Basilica of Saint John the Evangelist) in Stamford with Cardinal James Francis Stafford, President of the Pontifical Council for the Laity, presiding. Kung's body was then transported to Star of the Sea Church in San Francisco, California, for a Low Mass with Cardinal Paul Shan Kuo-hsi of Taiwan presiding. A requiem Pontifical High Mass using the Tridentine Liturgy in Latin was said the following day at Five Wounds Parish in San Jose, California, with Cardinal Shan again presiding.

Kung is interred next to Dominic Tang, S.J. (Archbishop of Canton, China) at Santa Clara Mission Cemetery in Santa Clara, California.

== See also ==
- Cardinal Kung Foundation

Catholic Church titles
Preceded by Auguste Haouissée	Bishop of Shanghai; 1950–2000	Succeeded by Joseph Fan Zhongliang
Previous: New position	Bishop of Suzhou; 1949–1950	Next: Joseph Xu Honggen
Preceded by Octavio Beras Rojas	Cardinal-Priest of San Sisto Vecchio; 1991–2000	Succeeded by Marian Jaworski
Records
Preceded by Ferdinando Giuseppe Antonelli	Oldest living Member of the Sacred College; 12 July 1993 – 12 March 2000	Succeeded by Corrado Bafile
