= Pope Pius XII and China =

Developments during Papacy of Pius XII (1939–1958)

Significant doctrinal and diplomatic developments involving the Holy See and Chinese Catholics occurred during the Papacy of Pius XII (1939–1958). The Vatican recognized Chinese rites in 1939, elevated the first Chinese cardinal in 1946, and established a Chinese hierarchy.

In 1942, the Holy See and the Republic of China established diplomatic relations. Previous efforts to establish diplomatic efforts had been blocked by France, which had positioned itself as the authority for Chinese Catholics after the unequal treaties were imposed on China following the Qing Empire's defeat in the Opium War.

An anti-communist, Pius XII during the Chinese Civil War prohibited Chinese Catholics from joining the Communist Party or participating in its activities. The Communists defeated the Chinese Nationalists and established the People's Republic of China in 1949. In 1950, the Holy See stated that participation in certain CCP-related organizations would result in excommunication from the Church. In response, initiatives including Fr. Wang Liangzuo's "Guangyuan Declaration of Catholic Self-Reformation" gained support from Chinese Catholics. This led to responses by the apostolic nuncio in China. Ultimately, Chinese authorities arrested the apostolic nuncios on allegations of colluding with American intelligence and false accusations of participating in a plot to kill Mao Zedong, Under police guard, deporting him British Hong Kong. The PRC broke off relations with the Holy See and in 1953, apostolic nuncio to China moved to Taiwan.

The PRC government persecuted many Chinese Catholics in the 1950s. In 1957, it established the Catholic Patriotic Association, which is part of its United Front system. Through this process, the Communist Party gained ultimate control over the appointment of Bishops. The Vatican's position was and is that the appointment of bishops is the prerogative of the Pope.

== Background ==
Following the British Empire's defeat of China in the First Opium War (1839–1841), China was required to permit foreign missionaries. The unequal treaties gave European powers jurisdiction over missions and some authority over Chinese Christians. France sought to frame itself as the protector of Catholics in China, which in turn led to a sustained diplomatic dispute with the Holy See about who had authority over Chinese Catholics.

For centuries, the Catholic Church did not recognize the Chinese Confucian customs of honouring deceased family members and tried to suppress these in favor of Catholic dogma. The Chinese revered this as an ancient ritual but the Vatican considered it to be a religious exercise that conflicted with Catholic dogma. As a result, the Church made little progress in China in the late 19th and early 20th centuries.

== Republic of China ==
Within a year of his election, Pope Pius XII made a dramatic change in policy on the Chinese Rites issue. At his request, the Sacred Congregation of the Propagation of Faith issued new instruction on December 8, 1939, by which Chinese customs were no longer considered "superstitious" but an honourable way of esteeming one's relatives and therefore permitted to Catholic Christians. The Papal decree changed the ecclesiastical situation in China.

Pius XII was an anti-communist. During the Chinese Civil War, Pius XII forbade Chinese Catholics from joining the Communist Party or participating in its activities.

Until the 1940s, Vatican interests in China were represented by an Apostolic Delegate (which does not have formal diplomatic status).In 1917, the ROC and the Holy See had agreed in principle to establish a diplomatic relationship. France, which had framed itself as the protector of Catholics in China since the unequal treaties and had a long-standing dispute with the Holy See as a result, had blocked these diplomatic efforts.

The Nationalist Government of China and the Vatican established diplomatic relations in June 1942, with the first Minister presenting his credentials in January 1943. As the Church began to flourish, Pius established a local ecclesiastical hierarchy; he received Archbishop Thomas Tien Ken-sin SVD into the Sacred College of Cardinals and later elevated him to the See of Peking.

In summer 1949, the Communist forces captured the Nationalist capital, Nanjing. The Nationalist government retreated to Guangzhou. Although most of the diplomatic corps in Nanjing also went to Guangzhou, the Papal ambassador (the Internuncio) remained in Nanjing. Pius XII instructed all Chinese bishops to remain in place. Two Chinese bishops traveling abroad refused Pius XII's instructions to return to China, remaining in exile in Europe and America.

== People's Republic of China ==
After WWII, about four million Chinese were members of the Catholic faith. This was less than one percent of the population but numbers rapidly increased. In 1949, there existed 20 archdioceses, 39 apostolic prefectures, 3080 foreign missionaries, and 2557 Chinese priests.

In 1948, there were fewer than 10,000 Catholics on Taiwan (where the Chinese Nationalist government retreated to in 1949) and 15 clergy. In 1954, there 32,000 Catholics on Taiwan.

=== Persecution ===
On October 1, 1949, Mao Zedong officially declared the founding of the People's Republic of China. Its constitution from September 1949 guaranteed all vital freedoms, including the freedom of religion, and prohibited discrimination against believers. However, the government was committed to its ideological vision of Marxism, which was very hostile to religion and supported its eradication. The communist party quickly equated religious affiliation as a test of political and ideological loyalty. It was especially hostile to religious bodies that it saw as outside of its control, as it considered the Catholic Church to be because of its relation to the Vatican and pope.

In Chinese cities, tolerance was practiced towards the Christian churches; but in rural areas, persecution began in 1950. New laws against counter-revolutionary activities from July 23, 1950, and February 1951.

Pius XII was an anti-communist and urged Catholics in China to resist the PRC government. In 1950, the Holy See stated that participation in certain CCP-related organizations would result in excommunication from the Church. In response, initiatives including Fr. Wang Liangzuo's "Guangyuan Declaration of Catholic Self-Reformation" gained support from Chinese Catholics. In turn, apostolic nuncio Antonio Riberi circulated a letter denouncing such proposed reforms, and in March 1951 Fr. Li Weiguang and a group of 783 priests, nuns, and lay Catholics signed a declaration opposing what they viewed as Vatican interference and Western imperialism. Chinese authorities arrested Riberi on allegations of colluding with American intelligence and false accusations of participating in a plot to kill Mao Zedong. Under police guard, Riberi was deported to British Hong Kong.

Following the outbreak of the Korean War, in which western nations such as the United States played a primary role, foreign missionaries (most of whom were westerners) were accused of being foreign agents, ready to turn the country over to imperialist forces. They were expelled from China and have never been allowed to return. The government confiscated mission properties. It refrained from jailing or executing Catholics in large numbers, as it feared an international war with the Western powers. The expulsion of foreign missionaries was intended to symbolize China's liberation from foreign imperialism.

The 'Preparatory Committee of the Oppose American and Aid Korea Three-Self Reform Movement of the Christian Church' was founded for the purpose of denouncing western missionaries in China. All churches were required to demonize foreign missionaries (even ones they had worked with for decades), and Chinese Christians who refused to comply were forced to enroll in political study sessions.

Y.T. Wu in July 1950 led a delegation on behalf of nineteen Protestant churches to meet with Premier Zhou Enlai. They jointly drafted a statement calling for Christian support for the government. Thus, the Three-Self Patriotic Movement was created and Christian communities in China severed all ties to foreign groups. YT Wu later became the chairman of the Three-Self organization in 1954. The official policy forbade Chinese religious entities from being under the control of foreign entities. This proved especially difficult for Roman Catholics, since the pope was considered such a foreign entity.

The Catholic Church was considered extremely threatening due to its hierarchical structure, its nationwide networks, and its ability to block government penetration. China demanded Catholics give their full allegiance to the state, superseding allegiance to the Pope; political neutrality was not an option.

Pope Pius XII responded in his 1951 encyclical Evangelii praecones.

=== Papal replies ===
Pope Pius XII, in his encyclical Ad Sinarum gentem on October 7, 1954, warned the Chinese pastors that a national church would no longer be Catholic. He took a flexible stand on financial and organizational autonomy, stating that the Church viewed missionary and financial aid activities always as transitional. The training of domestic institutions and the formation of native clergy was therefore always the priority. At the same time one should not belittle the generosity of other Christians, who finance missionary activities. Foreign priests came in the name of Christ to China, and not as agents of hostile powers. Regarding the autonomy to teach, he agreed, it ought to differ according to place and conform, when possible, to the nature and particular character of the Chinese people, and to its ancient traditional customs:

Lastly, there are some among you who would wish that your Church would be completely independent, not only, as We have said, in regard to its government and finances, but also in regard to the teaching of Christian doctrine and sacred preaching, in which they try to claim "autonomy". We do not at all deny that the manner of preaching and teaching ought to differ according to place and therefore ought to conform, when possible, to the nature and particular character of the Chinese people, as also to its ancient traditional customs. If this is properly done, certainly greater fruits will be gathered among you.

In 1955, a mass arrest took place in the Shanghai diocese by the Chinese government. In one night on September 8, 1955, more than 200 clergy and faithful, including Bishop Ignatius Kung Pin-Mei, the Bishop of Shanghai, who refused to support "the Three Autonomies" movements to be independent of the Holy See, were arrested.

=== Chinese Patriotic Catholic Association ===
In July 1957, Chinese delegates founded the Chinese Patriotic Catholic Association, breaking Vatican ties, since Rome was considered an instrument of American capitalism and aggression. Long "voluntary re-education courses" followed for clergy and lay people. Priests and bishops were encouraged to study Marxism–Leninism, the teachings of Chairman Mao, and the policies in order to give educated instruction to the Chinese people every Sunday. Counter-revolutionary elements were clergy who refused to participate in the patriotic program March 24 and 26, 1958, patriotic bishops took over the dioceses of Hankau and Wuchang. Others followed, after the rightful Catholic bishops were taken out and their legitimate representatives jailed as well, despite the vigorous protests of Pope Pius XII. Foreign missionaries were expelled; the fate of most domestic religious is not known.

The Chinese Catholic Patriotic Association is part of the United Front system. Through this process, the Communist Party has ultimate control over the appointment of Bishops. The Vatican's position is that the appointment of bishops is the prerogative of the Pope.

The Catholic Church in China developed into two communities. The "Patriotic" Church operates with approval of Chinese authorities and the "Underground" Church which professes loyalty to the Pope. "Underground" does not mean the underground church is secret (the community mostly operates openly) but refers to its lack of official approval and lack of official support.

=== The last encyclical of Pope Pius XII ===
With his encyclical Ad Apostolorum principis, Pope Pius XII protested persecution of Catholics in China.

== Pope Pius XII's writings on China ==
- 1. Instruction of the Sacred Congregation of the Propagation of Faith on mission related issues AAS 1939, 269
- 2. Instruction of the Sacred Congregation of the Propagation of Faith concerning Chinese rites AAS 1940, 24
- 3. Christmas Message December 24, 1945, AAS 1946, 15
- 4. Allocution to the new Cardinals February 2, 1946 AAS 1946, 141
- 5. Beatification of twenty-nine Chinese Martyrs, November 27, 1946, AAS 1947, 307
- 6. Apostolic Letter Cupimus Imprimis, January 18, 1952, AAS 1952, 153
- 7. Encyclical Ad Sinarum gentem, October 7, 1954, AAS 1955, 5
- 8. Address to Historians August 9, 1955 AAS 1955, 672
- 9. Encyclical Ad Apostolorum principis, June 29, 1958, AAS 1958, 601
