= Weizhu =

Weizhu (Chinese: 维柱) is a masculine given name. Notable people with the name include:

- Weizhu Bao (Chinese: 包维柱)), Chinese mathematician
- Joseph Zhang Weizhu (Chinese: 张维柱), Chinese Catholic prelate
