= Matthias Lu =

Chinese Catholic priest and Thomist philosopher (1919–2008)

Reverend Matthias Lu
- 呂穆迪
- Born: June 2, 1919; Baoding, Hebei, China
- Died: June 25, 2008 (aged 89); Napa, California, U.S.
- Burial place: Mont La Salle, Napa, California

Matthias Lu (Chinese: 呂穆迪; June 2, 1919 – June 25, 2008) was a Chinese Catholic priest and Thomist philosopher. He served as vicar to East Asian Catholics for the Diocese of Oakland from 1969 to 1986.

== Biography ==
Lu was born in Baoding, in Hebei province, China, to Paul and Rose Lu. He was ordained a priest in 1942 and left China in 1946 to study at the Pontificia Universita Urbaniana, where he received a Licentiate and, later, a Ph.D.

In the 1950s, Lu emigrated to North America and lectured at a number of institutions, including the University of Notre Dame, St. Bonaventure University, University of Ottawa, and Saint John's University (Minnesota). His longest-running association was with Saint Mary's College of California, a university under the direction of the Institute of the Brothers of the Christian Schools. He served as professor, researcher, chaplain, and director of the International Saint Thomas Aquinas Center. In 1988, he was named an affiliated member (AFSC) of the Christian Brothers. Lu also ministered to the San Francisco Bay Area's East Asian community through the radio station KUSF.

Pope Pius XII conferred upon him the Pro Ecclesia et Pontifice award in 1939, and Pope John Paul II awarded him with a Benemerenti Medal in 1985.

== Translator and Author ==
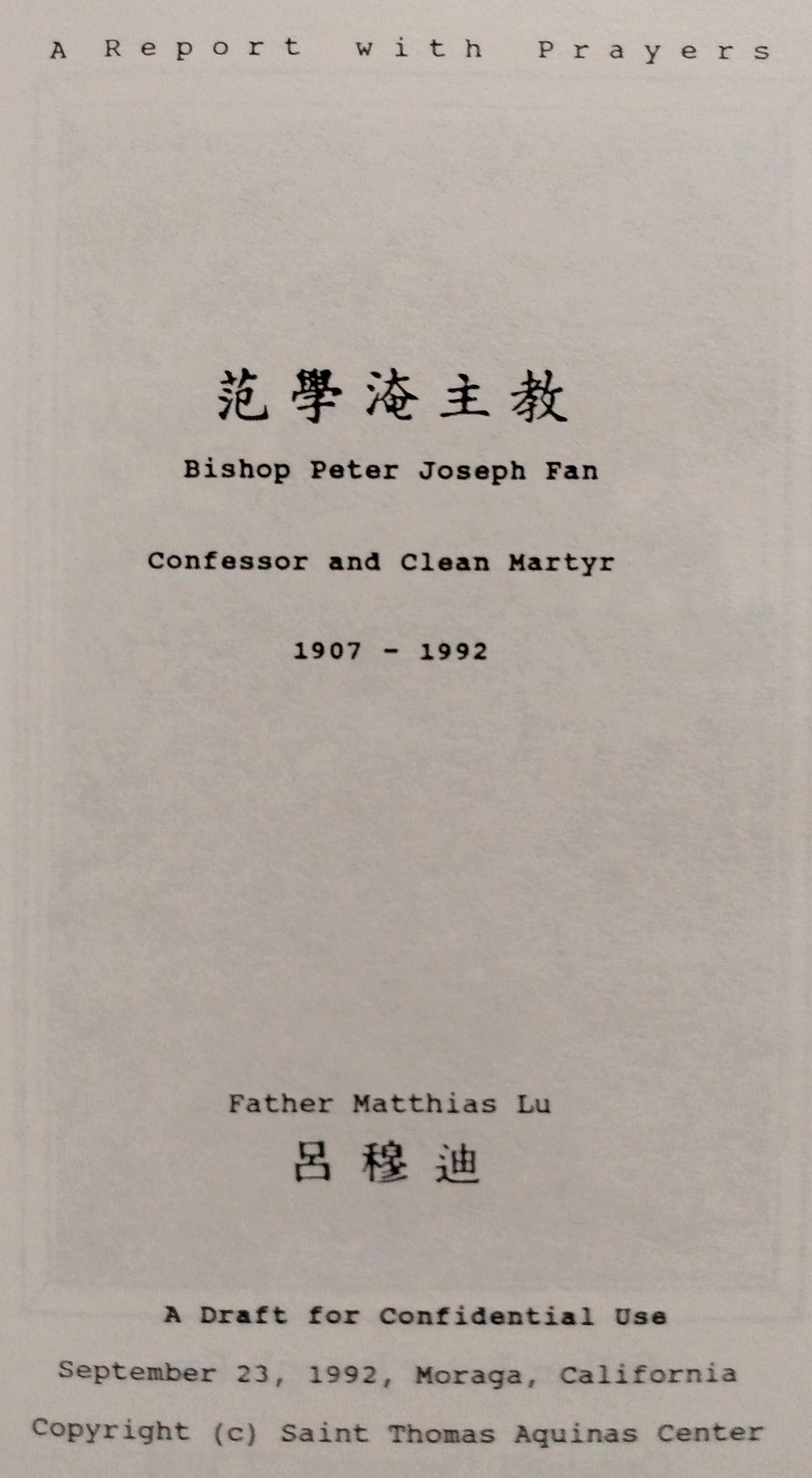

Lu translated numerous works by the Apostolic Fathers, Aristotle, and Thomas Aquinas into Chinese. Lu expressed his own Realist anthropology in the Latin work A Critical Theoretical Inquiry on the Notion of Act in the Metaphysics of Aristotle and Saint Thomas Aquinas (1992).

Lu's pamphlet Bishop Fan (1992) was written about the lack of religious freedom under the Chinese Communist Party. It is partially a biography of Peter Joseph Fan Xueyan, bishop of Baoding from 1951, as well as an indictment of the Catholic Patriotic Association.

== Select Essays ==
- Lu, Matthias (Spring 1996). "Hypocrisy or Tactful Machination? Assessing a Pastoral Letter of the Government-Approved Catholic Bishop's (Patriotic Association) Conference in China". The Cardinal Kung Foundation.
- Lu, Matthias (1958). "Fifty Years of Chinese Philosophy, 1898-1950". New Scholasticism. 32 (2): 294–295. doi:10.5840/newscholas195832244.
- Lu, Matthias (1953). "On the Sacrements of the Christian Faith". New Scholasticism. 27 (1): 104–109. doi:10.5840/newscholas19532716.

== Select Addresses ==
- "Martyrdom For Truth and Liberty in the People's Republic of China (1949-1996)," The 5th World Congress of Christian Philosophy, Lublin, 1996.
- "Human Family and Human Children for a Human World," World Forum of NGOs, Malta, 1993.
- "Doctores Tres, Unus in Amore" Congressus Internationalis De Beato Joanne Duns Scoto, Rome, 1993.
- "Saint Thomas Aquinas in China," The 8th International Congress of Medieval Philosophy at the University of Helsinki, 1987.
- "The Common Man of Today Needs Saint Thomas Aquinas as a Whole Person," Convention on the 100th Anniversary of Leo XIII's Aeterni Patris at the Angelicum University, Rome, 1979.
