= Catholic Church in China =

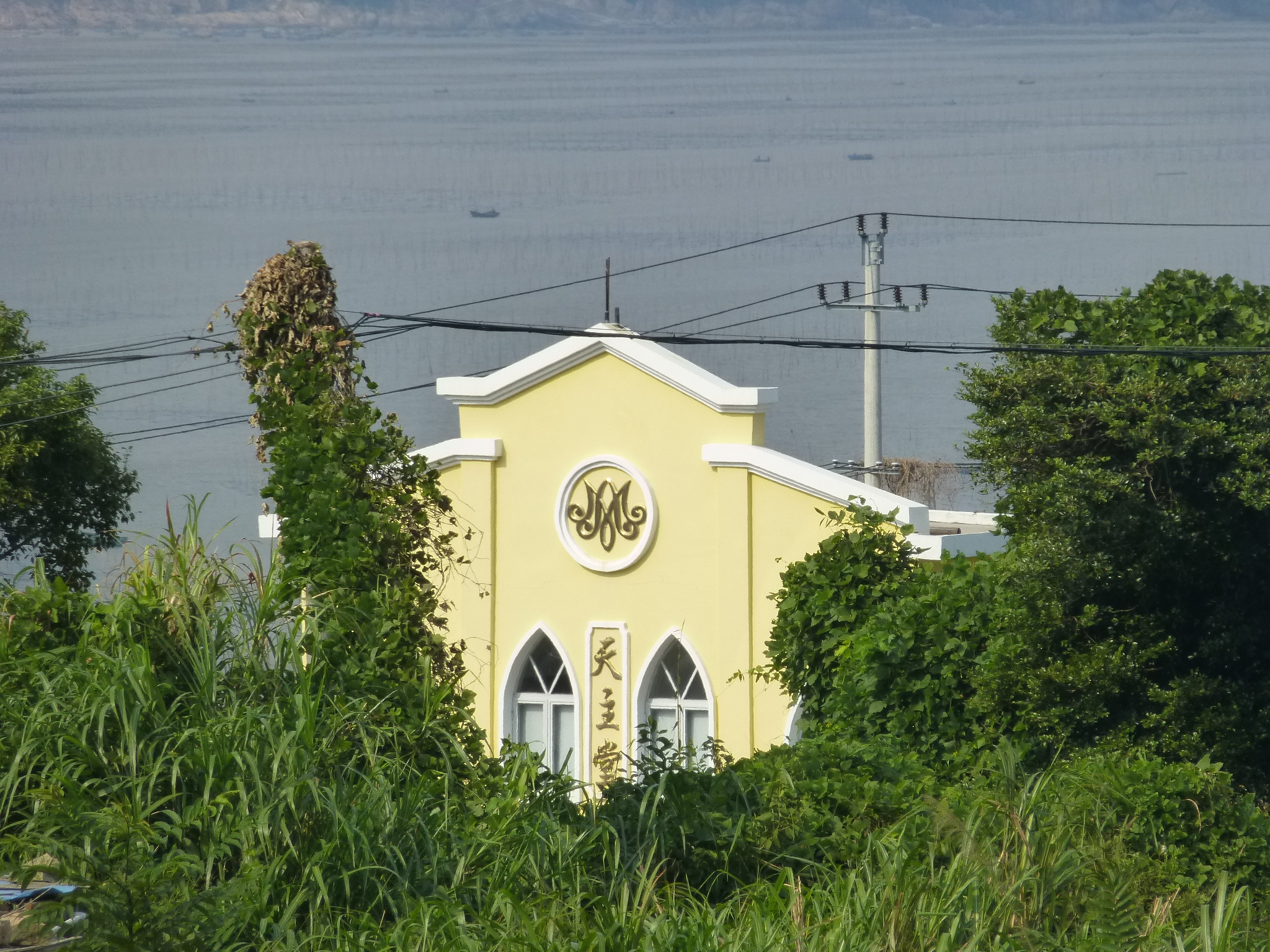
A Catholic church on East China Sea coast (Cangnan County, Zhejiang)

The Catholic Church (Chinese: 天主教; pinyin: Tiānzhǔ jiào; lit. 'Religion of the Lord of Heaven', after the Chinese term for the Christian God) first appeared in China upon the arrival of John of Montecorvino in China proper during the Yuan dynasty; he was the first Catholic missionary in the country, and would become the first bishop of Khanbaliq (1271–1368).

The Jesuit Matteo Ricci was successful in Catholic missionary work in China. His approach viewed certain Confucian and Chinese folk practices as non-religious in nature and therefore compatible with Catholic practice. Other missionaries objected to this approach and after the hundred year long Chinese Rites controversy, the Vatican ordered the Jesuits to abandon the culturally accommodating approach Ricci had developed.

After the Chinese Communist Party (CCP) won the Chinese Civil War, Catholic and Protestant missionaries were expelled from the country. In 1957, the CCP established the Chinese Catholic Patriotic Association (CCPA) in Beijing, which rejects the authority of the Holy See and appoints its own preferential bishops. Catholics in the People's Republic of China are divided between the official CCPA and an underground church that which sees itself as loyal to the Holy See and refuses to recognize government-appointed bishops. In September 2018, China and the Holy See reached a provisional agreement giving the Pope the power to veto any bishop which the Chinese government recommends. The parties have extended the provisional agreement twice, most recently in October 2024.

== Terminology ==
Terms used to refer to God in Chinese differ even among Christians.

Arriving in China during the Tang dynasty, the earliest Christian missionaries from the Church of the East referred to their religion as Jǐngjiào (景教, literally, "bright teaching"). Originally, some Catholic missionaries and scholars advanced the use of Shàngdì (上帝, literally, "The Emperor from Above"), as being more native to the Chinese language. Other Catholic missionaries coined the neologism Tiānzhǔ (天主, literally, "Lord of Heaven") which became the dominant usage. Within the Catholic Church, the term 'gōngjiào' (公教, literally "universal teaching") is not uncommon, this being also the original meaning of the word "catholic". When Protestants arrived in China in the 19th century, they favored Shangdi over Tianzhu. Many Protestants use Shén (神), which generically means "god" or "spirit" (although Catholic priests are called shénfù (神父, literally "spiritual father")), or Yēhéhuá (耶和華, a transliteration of Jehovah). Meanwhile, the Mandarin Chinese translation of Jesus, used by all Christians, is Jīdū (基督).

=== Catholics and Protestants ===
The modern Chinese language generally divides Christians into two groups: adherents of Catholicism, Tiānzhǔjiào (天主教), and adherents of Protestantism, Jīdūjiào (基督教) or Jīdū Xīnjiào (基督新教—"New Religion"). Chinese speakers see Catholicism and Protestantism as distinct religions. Thus, in Western languages, the term "Christianity" can subsume both Catholics and Protestants (i.e., Christians as opposed to, for example, Hindus or Jews). In Chinese, however, there is not a commonly used term that can subsume the two (but today in Chinese Catholic literature, the term "Jīdū zōngjiào" (基督宗教) is used to signify all Christian sects, as the term in Chinese means "religion of Christ"). Eastern Orthodoxy is called Dōngzhèngjiào (東正教), which is simply a literal translation of "Eastern Orthodox Religion" into Chinese

== Yuan dynasty (1271–1368) ==
A series of reports about the Far East reached the Catholic West in the mid thirteenth century.

- The Nestorian Christian and Turkic Chinese monk Rabban Bar Sauma (c. 1220–1294) travelled from China to Europe to meet Pope Nicholas IV.
  - The long-present Church of the East had been the most geographically dispersed Christian church, but was by then in decline, and it may have suffered competition from the new Catholic missions and Islam: "controversies with the emissaries of .... Rome, and the progress of Mohammedanism, sapped the foundations of their ancient churches." The Catholics and Orthodox considered Nestorianism as heretical, though the so-called Nestorians mainly did not hold the particular beliefs attributed to Nestorius that had been anathematized. The expulsion of Christians by the Ming Dynasty seems to have ended the Church of the East in China.
- Also in the thirteenth century, Armenian King Hethum I, Giovanni da Pian del Carpine, and William Rubruck visited Mongolia.
- In 1245, Pope Innocent IV sent a series of four missions to the Mongols. The first was led by the Dominican André de Longjumeau. Three other missions were sent between March and April 1245, led respectively by the Dominican Ascelin of Cremone (accompanied by Simon de Saint-Quentin, the Franciscan Lawrence of Portugal, and another Franciscan, John of Plano Carpini.
- Towards the end of the century Hayton of Corycus wrote about China and the Mongols.
- At the turn of the century, the Italian book The Travels of Marco Polo started being circulated in manuscript.

Missionary priests of the Latin Catholic Church in Europe are recorded to have entered China in the late 13th century, with the earliest being Franciscans. The Italian Franciscan priest John of Montecorvino arrived in the new capital Khanbaliq (modern-day Beijing) in 1294. In 1299 he built a church and in 1305 a second opposite the imperial palace. Having made a study of the local language, he began to translate the New Testament and the Psalms. Estimates of converts range from 6,000 to 30,000 by the year 1300.

In 1307 Pope Clement V sent seven Franciscan bishops to consecrate John of Montecorvino as Archbishop of Peking. The three who survived the journey did so in 1308 and succeeded each other as bishops at Zaiton, where John had established. In 1312 three more Franciscan bishops arrived from Rome to aid John until his death in 1328. He converted Armenians in China and Alans in Beijing to Catholicism. Armenians in Quanzhou were also Franciscan Catholics. The Franciscan Odoric of Pordenone visited China during this era. Caterina Vilioni's Catholic tombstone was found in Yangzhou.

The mission had some success during the rule of the Mongol-led Yuan dynasty, but various factors led to an ultimate shrinking of the mission. Six centuries later, however, John of Montecorvino's attempt at the translation of the Bible became the inspiration for another Franciscan, the Blessed Gabriele Allegra, to go to China and in 1968 complete the first translation of the Catholic Bible into the Chinese language, after a 40-year personal effort.

In 1338, representatives of the Great Khan (Toghon Temür) arrived in Europe inviting the Pope to send priests for the local Christians. Friar John of Marignolli and between fifty and one hundred fellow Franciscans were dispatched, arriving in Khanbaliq (Beijing) in 1342. This mission stayed with government encouragment until the Mongols were overthrown in around 1368 and the antagonistic Ming dynasty was installed. The last reported Franciscan being stoned by Buddhist monks in 1400.

== Ming dynasty (1368–1644) ==
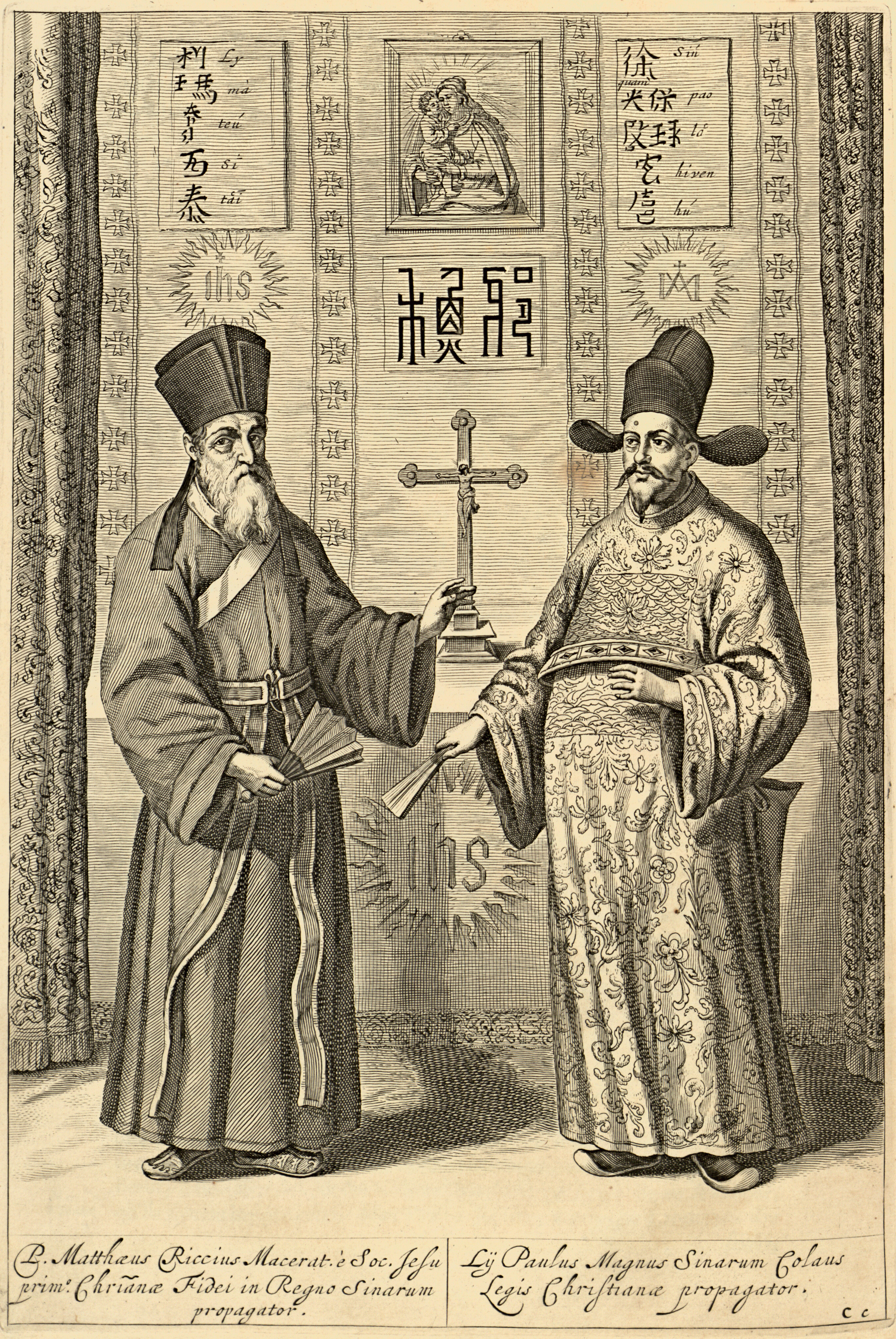
Matteo Ricci (left) and Xu Guangqi (right) in the Chinese edition of Euclid's Elements published in 1607

Beginning in the 1450s, Catholic missions were administered through patronage rights (jus patronatus). Following the Treaty of Tordesillas in 1494, Pope Julius II granted Asia to Portugal's patronage (padroado). Portugal therefore obtained administrative authority over Catholic missions in China, including (1) the ability to appoint bishops and missionaries and build churches and (2) the responsibility to fund and protect missions. Portugal became engaged in a series of geopolitical struggles, including its incorporation into the Hapsburg Spain and its wars. Portugal was unable to effectively implement its patronage in east Asia.

The Propaganda Fide asserted the law of commissions (jus commisionis). The Propaganda Fide thus had the right to appoint apostolic vicars to function as the bishops of dioceses not yet established. Because of the simultaneous existence of the Propaganda Fide's rights and the patronage system, parts of China had church officials appointed under each power structure.

From Macau, Catholic missionaries arrived in Ming China in 1583. They were subject to accusations of espionage and witchcraft.

The permanent mission was established in 1601 by the efforts of the Jesuit Matteo Ricci. His whole approach was quite subtle, interesting the Wanli Emperor and the Ming Chinese authorities in aspects of western technology and learning as a point of opening. He also made attempts to reconcile Christianity with the Classic Confucian texts, though he was hostile, along with the other members of the Society of Jesus, to Taoism and Buddhism. Ricci's approach to missionary work respected Chinese culture, deeming certain Confucian and folk practices to be civil rather than religious in nature and therefore not inconsistent with Catholic practice.

Ricci died in 1610 but the Jesuit mission went on to become an important part of the Imperial civil service right into the 18th century. In 1644 a German Jesuit, Adam Schall von Bell, was appointed Director of the Board of Astronomy by the new Qing dynasty. Jesuits were also given posts as mechanics, musicians, painters, instrument makers, and in other areas that required technical expertise. Likewise, the development of Catholic Christianity in China originated an interesting process of cultural and artistic hybridization during early globalization and up to the present. An example of this is the Christian works of art made in the cloisonné technique.

Within 60 years after Ricci's death, the number of Catholics in China had grown to 300,000.

During this period, European countries competed for Catholic influence in China and the religion did not expand far into China. During the late Ming and early Qing era, Chinese Catholics began developing their own institutions without major foreign interference.

== Qing dynasty (1644–1912) ==
In the Qing dynasty, the Jesuits' pragmatic accommodation with Confucianism was later to lead to conflict with the Dominican friars, who came to Beijing from the Philippines in the middle of the century. Dominican leader Domingo Fernández Navarrete in responding to the question "Was Confucius saved?" said that since Greek philosophers such as Socrates, Plato, Aristotle, Seneca, and others were all damned "how much the more Confucius, who was not worthy to kiss their feet"? In responding, António de Gouveia, a Portuguese Jesuit, said that Confucius was certainly saved, "which is more than can be said for King Philip IV of Spain."

While up to this point there had been debate among Western clergy as to whether to ordain Chinese men as priests, the debate was settled in 1654 when Luo Wenzao (also known as Gregory Lopez) was ordained a priest for the Dominican Order.

After the Rites controversy of the late 17th century and early 18th century ended in the expulsion of missionaries from most of China, access to the people of China was difficult for the Catholic Church. The controversy revolved around the reluctance of the Church to recognize local Confucian customs of honouring deceased family members. To the Chinese, this was an ancient ritual; to the Vatican it was a religious exercise which conflicted with Catholic dogma. Some missionaries objected to the legacy of what they viewed as Matteo Ricci's concessions to superstitious practices. The Vatican ultimately sided with these missionaries and ordered the Jesuits to abandon Ricci's cultural approach. Due to the Rites controversy, the Kangxi Emperor required missionaries to declare their adherence to "the rules of Matteo Ricci" which tolerated the Chinese rites. In 1724, the Yongzheng Emperor expelled all missionaries who failed to support Ricci's position on accommodation.

Under the "fundamental laws" of China, one section is titled "Wizards, Witches, and all Superstitions, prohibited." The Jiaqing Emperor in 1814 added a sixth clause in this section with reference to Christianity. It was modified in 1821 and printed in 1826 by the Daoguang Emperor. It sentenced Europeans to death for spreading Catholic Christianity among Han Chinese and Manchus (Manchurian people, originally from North China). Christians who would not repent their conversion were sent to Muslim cities in Xinjiang, to be given as slaves to Muslim leaders and Baigs. Manchu Christians would also be removed from their Banner registers after being given as slaves to the Baigs.

Some hoped that the Chinese government would discriminate between Protestantism and Catholicism, since the law was directed at Catholicism, but after Protestant missionaries in 1835–6 gave Christian books to Chinese, the Daoguang Emperor demanded to know who were the "traitorous natives in Canton who had supplied them with books." The foreign missionaries were strangled or expelled by the Chinese.

Following the British Empire's defeat of China in the First Opium War (1839–1841), China was required to permit foreign missionaries. The unequal treaties gave European powers jurisdiction over missions and some authority over Chinese Christians. France sought to frame itself as the protector of Catholics in China, which in turn led to a sustained diplomatic dispute with the Holy See about who had authority over Chinese Catholics.

From 1842 to 1949, Catholic religious orders operating in China included the Foreign Missions of Paris, the Milan Foreign Missions, Maryknoll Society, the Lazarists, Franciscans, the Discalced Carmelite Nuns, and the Salesians of Don Bosco. The membership of religious societies was primarily foreign.

It was shortly after the commencement of this period of the Qing dynasty that history's bloodiest civil war took place; led by the leader Hong Xiuquan of the Taiping Rebellion, that claimed upwards of 20-milion lives. Xiuquan, a failed bureaucrat and former student of Christianity who after being christened by Baptists missionaries in the late 1840s, went onto proclaim himself the younger brother of Jesus Christ; blending many Protestant concepts with ancient Chinese spiritual beliefs he founded a religious cult centered largely on his own self proclaimed divinity, eventually declared himself Emperor of the Taiping Heavenly Kingdom that waged a campaign of total war against the Qing government from 1850-1864.

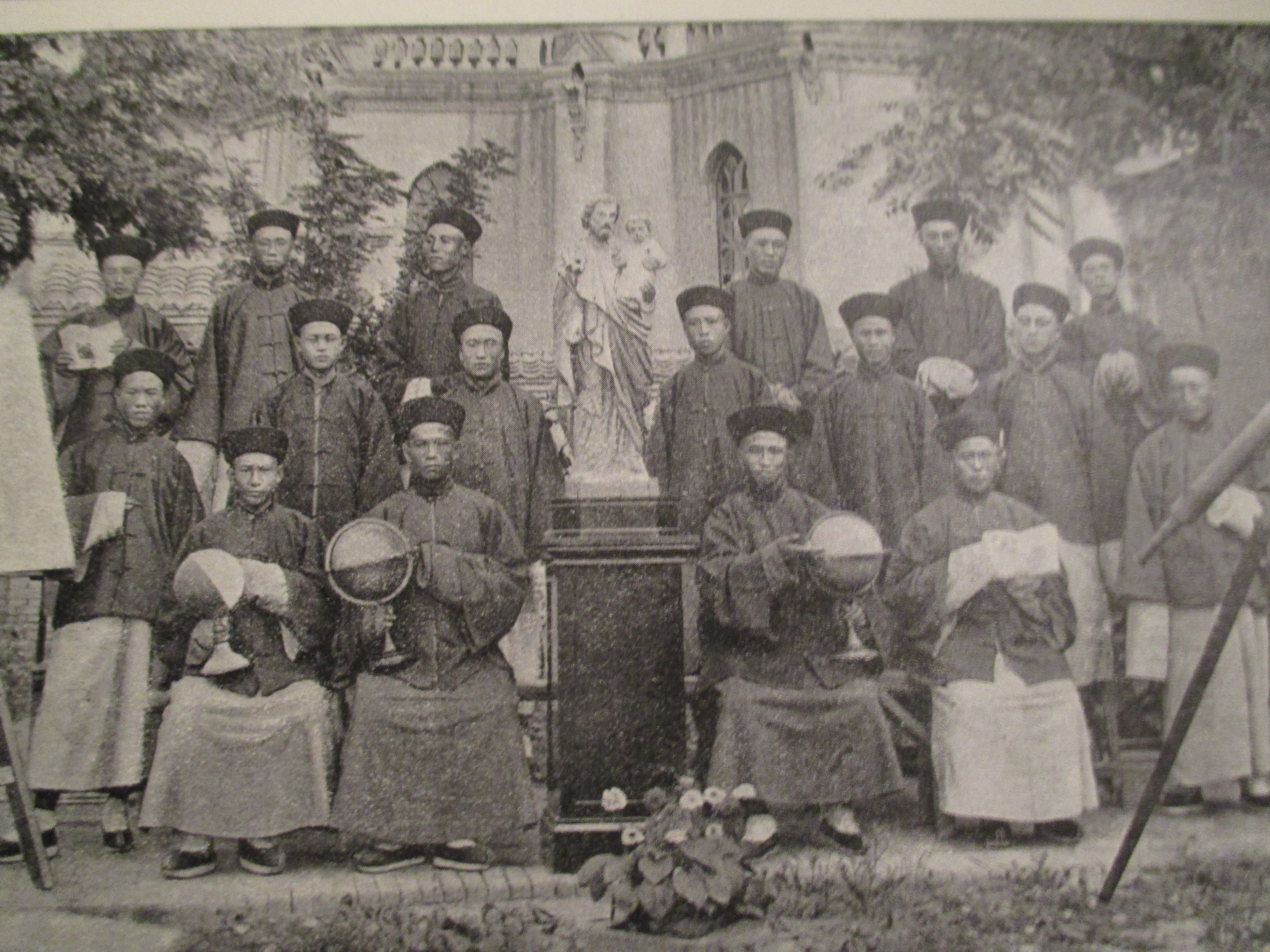
Chinese seminarians in a Jesuit mission in 1900.

The ability to intervene in court cases pursuant to treaty rights made the Catholic Church a new source of power in local Chinese society. It obtained support from people living at the margins of Chinese society and groups seeking allies in local conflicts. Chinese who converted to Catholicism to obtain protection were sometimes called rice Christians, litigation Christians, or feud Christians. Foreign Catholic involvement in local disputes resulted in anti-Christian sentiment and responses, including the Boxer Rebellion. During the Boxer Rebellion (1899–1901), approximately 30,000 Chinese Catholics and several hundred foreign Catholics were killed.

The Qing dynasty imperial government permitted French Catholic Christian missionaries to enter and proselytize in Tibetan lands, which weakened the control of the Tibetan Buddhist Lamas, who refused to give allegiance to the Chinese. The Tibetan Lamas were alarmed and jealous of Catholic missionaries converting natives to Catholicism. During the 1905 Tibetan Rebellion the Tibetan Buddhist Gelug Yellow Hat sect led a Tibetan revolt. The Lamas massacred Christian missionaries and native converts to Christianity and besieged Bat'ang, burning down the mission chapel and killing two foreign missionaries, Père Mussot and Père Soulié. The Chinese Amban's Yamen was surrounded and Chinese General Wu Yi-chung was shot dead in the Yamen by Lama forces. The Chinese Amban Feng and Commandant in Chief Li Chia-jui managed to escape by scattering rupees behind them, which the Tibetans proceeded to pick up. The Ambans reached Commandant Lo's place, but the 100 Tibetan troops serving under the Amban, armed with modern weaponry, mutinied when news of the revolt reached them. The Tibetan Lamas and their Tibetan followers besieged the Chinese Commandant Lo's palace along with local Christian converts. In the palace they killed all Christian converts, both Chinese and Tibetan.

In 1907, the publication of Canon Léon Joly's Le Christianisme et l'Extrême-Orient resulted in major reactions from Catholic missionaries in China. Léon Joly's's study of missionary histories in Asia concluded that Church missions had been a failure to date, achieving little despite major financial investments and personnel investment across centuries. In Léon Joly's view, Catholic missions in China had failed because of the Church's reliance on foreign political power and European clergy keeping Chinese in subordinate positions, creating European spiritual colonies rather than local churches.

One of the major contrary voices in the Catholic missionary community was Louis-Marie Kervyn, whose 1911 text on missionary methods contended that Chinese were inherently immoral, inferior to Europeans by nature, and potentially possessing an extra degree of original sin. The text was initially well received by missionaries in China. In 1914, the Holy See condemned the text as heretical.

== Republic of China ==
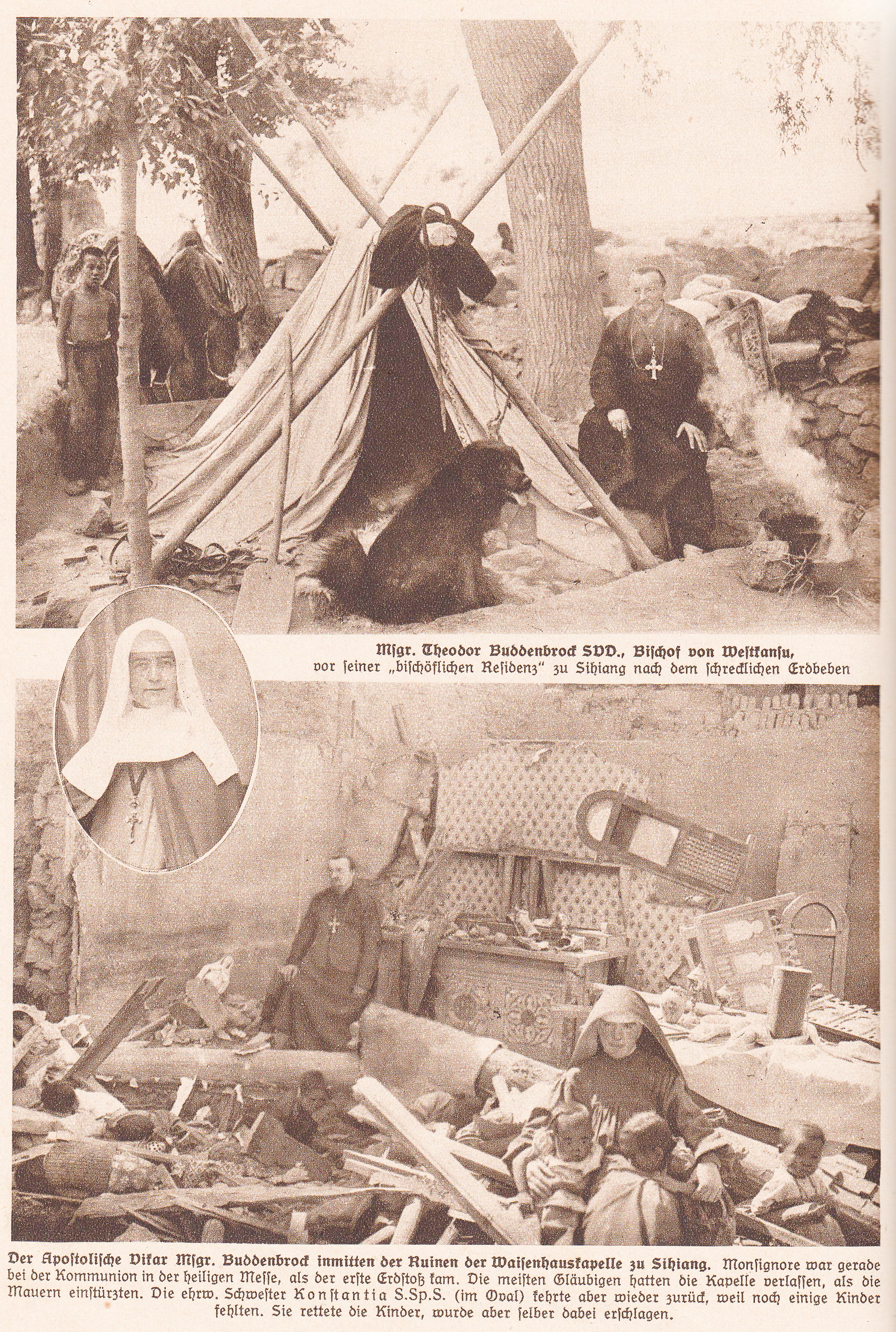
Monseigneur Theodor Buddenbrock conducts missionary work in China 1927

After the 1911 Revolution, which led to the founding of the Republic of China (ROC), reform-minded priests such as Vincent Lebbe and prominent Catholic laymen such as Ma Xiangbo and Ying Lianzhi protested to Pope Benedict XV that the French who made up 70% of clergy and controlled the Chinese Church were chauvinist and disdainful of China. Chinese priests were discriminated against and many left the clergy, as Ma Xiangbo himself had done. Benedict directed the establishment of the Catholic University of Peking, which opened in 1925.

In 1917, the ROC and the Holy See agreed in principle to establish a diplomatic relationship. France, which had framed itself as the protector of Catholics in China since the unequal treaties and had a long-standing dispute with the Holy See as a result, blocked these diplomatic efforts. As a result, Vatican interests in China were represented by an Apostolic Delegate (which does not have formal diplomatic status) until the 1940s.

In 1919, director of the Propaganda Fide Willem Marinus van Rossum dispatched an apostolic visitor to China, who was tasked with visiting all major Catholic missions and to investigate the Catholic Church's relative lack of success in China, compared to the growth in Protestantism.

The 1924 synod in Shanghai, which was the first nationwide council of the Catholic Church in China and was led by Celso Benigno Luigi Costantini.

The Kuomintang's 1926 National Congress in Canton endorsed the growing anti-Christian movement in China, labelling missionaries as "tongues and claws of imperialism." Protests and riots linked to the Nationalists frequently occurred, sometimes with Nationalist troops participating. Several mission properties were destroyed or looted. However, since the Kuomintang leaders, many being Christians themselves, held back from starting an actual conflict with the Christian churches, although they encouraged the propaganda against the churches. Hence, Chiang Kai-shek attempted to reassure missionaries they would not be targeted, although attacks against missions continued.

In 1926, the first Chinese Catholic Bishops in modern times were consecrated in Rome: Odoric Chenge Hede, Philippus Zhao Huaiyi, Simon Zhu Kaimin, Joseph Hu Ruoshan, Melchior Sun De-zhen, and Aloysius Chen Guodi) were consecrated in Rome. The Holy See framed these consecrations as an important moment for indigenizing the Catholic Church. After leaving Rome, the new bishops toured Italy, France, Belgium, and Holland where crowds of local European Catholics greeted them. Critics of the consecrations reacted strongly, such as former Italian diplomat to China Count Carlo Sforza, who contended that the Holy See had been naively optimistic and that the supremacy of the Aryan race was unchallenged.

After the Japan succeeded in its invasion of Manchuria and its 1932 establishment of its Manchukuo puppet state, the Vatican retained its presence in the occupied region. This initially resulted in tension between the ROC and Vatican, but the Vatican ultimately satisfied the ROC that it needed to maintain its presence in the occupied region for the benefit of Catholics there and that the Vatican's presence did not imply an acceptance of the Manchukuo state.

Within months of his election, Pope Pius XII issued a further change in policies. On 8 December 1939, the Sacred Congregation for the Propagation of the Faith issued—at the request of Pius XII—a new instruction, by which Chinese customs were no longer considered superstitious, but instead an honourable way of esteeming one's relatives and therefore permitted by the Catholic Church.

The internuncio Antonio Riberi arrived in China in 1942. The government of the Republic of China established diplomatic relations with the Vatican in 1943. As the Church began to flourish, Pope Pius established a local ecclesiastical hierarchy and elevated the Archbishop of Peking, Thomas Tien Ken-sin, SVD, to the Sacred College of Cardinals. After World War II, about four million Chinese were members of the Catholic Church. This was less than one percent of the population but numbers increased dramatically. In 1949, there existed:

- 20 archdioceses
- 85 dioceses
- 39 apostolic prefectures
- 3,080 missionaries
- 2,557 Chinese priests.

== People's Republic of China ==
During the Chinese Civil War, Pope Pius XII forbade Chinese Catholics from joining the Chinese Communist Party (CCP) or participating in its activities.

In summer of 1949, CCP forces captured the Nationalist capital, Nanjing. The Nationalist government retreated to Guangzhou. Although most of the diplomatic corps in Nanjing also went to Guangzhou, the papal ambassador (the internuncio) remained in Nanjing. Pius XII instructed all Chinese bishops to remain in place. Veteran religious personnel were also encouraged to remain in place but seminarians were encouraged to leave and continue their studies in environments deemed more politically stable. The Vatican issued decrees prohibiting Catholics from cooperating with Communists or reading Communist literature.

In 1950, the Holy See stated that participation in certain CCP-related organizations would result in excommunication from the Church. In response, initiatives including Fr. Wang Liangzuo's "Guangyuan Declaration of Catholic Self-Reformation" gained support from Chinese Catholics. In turn, apostolic nuncio Antonio Riberi circulated a letter denouncing such proposed reforms, and in March 1951 Fr. Li Weiguang and a group of 783 priests, nuns, and lay Catholics signed a declaration opposing what they viewed as Vatican interference and Western imperialism.

Riberi organised the Legion of Mary, a group of Catholic activists from among the elites, in opposing the PRC. Chinese authorities arrested Riberi on allegations of colluding with American intelligence and false accusations of participating in a plot to kill Chairman of the Chinese Communist Party Mao Zedong. Under police guard, Riberi was deported to British Hong Kong.

China broke off diplomatic relations with the Holy See in 1951. The CCP framed these actions in terms of Chinese Catholics reclaiming their church in the context of broader opposition to Western imperialism.

In the 1950s, Shanghai was the major site of Catholic opposition to China's religious policies.

Foreign missionaries were accused of being foreign agents, ready to turn the country over to imperialist forces. The Holy See reacted with several encyclicals and apostolic letters, including Cupimus Imprimis, Ad Apostolorum principis, and Ad Sinarum gentem.

In 1955, the Chinese government arrested dozens of Catholic clerics and laity in Shanghai (most notably Bishop Ignatius Kung Pinmei) and prosecuted them as the "Kung Pinmei counterrevolutionary clique" for activities the government deemed counterrevolutionary.

The Catholic Church in China developed into two communities. The state-sanctioned "Patriotic" Church operates with approval of Chinese authorities and an underground church which professes loyalty to the pope. "Underground" does not mean the underground church is secret (in contemporary China, the community mostly operates openly) but refers to its lack of official approval and lack of official support.

Since then, Catholicism, like all religions, was permitted to operate only under the supervision of the State Administration for Religious Affairs, a state body that was merged into the United Front Work Department of the Central Committee of the Chinese Communist Party in 2018 during a series of institutional reforms. All legal worship was to be conducted through state-approved churches belonging to the Chinese Catholic Patriotic Association (CCPA), which did not accept the primacy of the Roman Pontiff. In addition to overseeing the practice of the Catholic faith, the CCPA espoused politically oriented objectives as well. Liu Bainian, chairman of the CCPA and the Bishops Conference of the Catholic Church in China (BCCCC), stated in a 2011 interview that the church needed individuals who "love the country and love religion: politically, they should respect the Constitution, respect the law, and fervently love the socialist motherland."

Some Catholics who recognized the authority of the Holy See chose to worship clandestinely due to the risk of harassment from authorities. Several underground Catholic bishops were reported as disappeared or imprisoned, and harassment of unregistered bishops and priests was common. There were reports of Catholic bishops and priests being forced by authorities to attend the ordination ceremonies for bishops who had not gained Vatican approval. Chinese authorities also had reportedly pressured Catholics to break communion with the Vatican by requiring them to renounce an essential belief in Catholicism, the primacy of the Roman Pontiff. In the past, however, authorities have permitted some Vatican-loyal churches to carry out operations.

In 1978, the Vatican's Congregation for the Evangelization of Peoples issued a document to be circulated in China which granted special privileges and faculties to Catholics there. It circulated as a booklet written in both Latin and Chinese, titled the Faculties and Privileges Granted to Clergy and Catholics Living in Mainland China in These Grave Circumstances (the Chinese text did not include the phrase, "in these grave circumstances"). To address a lack of priests and bishops whom the Vatican deemed legitimate, the document relaxed various requirements regarding the administration of the sacraments, the ordination of priests, and how priests could perform their duties. Some powers typically reserved for bishops were devolved to priests in the absence of a bishop. The document also stated that fasting, abstinence, and Sabbath rest were to be observed only if possible and stated that Catholics could marry non-Catholics if the non-Catholic spouse promised to raise children in the religion. It states that these special privileges are only for Catholics in "all the territory of China" and that prudence should be taken in implementing them, with bishops consulted where available. From the Vatican perspective, the document was framed in terms of pastoral care. It does not explicitly refer to church-state conflicts or China-Holy See relations.

In the 1980s, north China was the major site of Catholic opposition to China's religious policies, in part because of the efforts of Bishop Joseph Fan Xueyan, who ordained numerous priests and consecrated at least seven bishops in the underground church.

While Article 36 of China's Constitution (adopted in 1982) provides for "freedom of religious belief" and non-discrimination on religious bases, it also states that "[n]o one shall use religion to engage in activities that disrupt public order, impair the health of citizens or interfere with the state's education system" and "[r]eligious groups and religious affairs shall not be subject to control by foreign forces."

In 1982, the patriotic church opened its first seminary of the reform era at Sheshan, with Aloysius Jin Luxian as its rector.

Following a 1988 meeting of the Congregation for the Evangelization of Peoples, the Vatican circulated a document authored by Cardinal Jozef Tomko to Catholic bishops worldwide to discuss the Vatican's view of the Church's situation in China. It noted that after the CCPA began nominating bishops, the Church in China developed into a state-official church focused on the autonomous process for appointing bishops and the underground church which kept "hierarchical belonging to the Roman Pontiff". The document states that there are also clergy in the state official church advocating an intermediate approach. It describes that the bishops consecrated after 1958 were "gravely illicit" but valid. Therefore, the Vatican's judgment on the status of these bishops would need to be determined on a case-by-case basis. Priests ordained by these bishops could validly administer the sacraments. The document also said Catholics could go to priests not in communion with the Vatican, although doing so was not preferable. It stated that when clergy of China's official church went abroad, clergy in full communion with the Vatican should not worship with them.

Although intended to be confidential, the 1988 document was leaked to the press and became public. The Chinese government addressed the 1988 Vatican document in an internal circular which described the document as an effort to support "underground Catholic forces in carrying out anti-government, anti-autonomous Catholic Church activities."

In 1989, a group of underground bishops informed the Vatican of their intent to institute their own bishops' conference for China. Cardinal Jozef Tomko sent a letter to the chargé d'affaires of the apostolic nunciature on Taiwan, asking that he inform the underground bishops that "while understanding the no doubt just reasons driving the interested parties to formulate to proposals" ... "for now it is not opportune that they be implemented." The underground bishops met as a conference without Vatican approval. Within a few months, almost all the meeting attendees were arrested.

Catholic Masses were typically held in Latin prior to 1992, when the state approved widespread Mass in the vernacular. Among the proponents of bringing the liturgy of the patriotic church into line with post-Vatican II reforms was Aloysius Jin Luxian.

In contemporary China, the shortage of Catholic priests is exacerbated by rising economic opportunities in China and the legacy of the state's former one-child policy.

In 2016, Xi Jinping announced a campaign to "sinicize" all of the country's religions in an effort to bring them more in line with CCP ideology. In October 2018, Chinese government officials destroyed two Marian shrines, one in Shanxi and one in Guizhou. In the 2020s, Catholics in the PRC are under increased pressure to join the CCPA and have been subject to growing surveillance, enforced disappearance, torture, and travel restrictions, according to Human Rights Watch. The Chinese government responded that Human Rights Watch is "consistently biased against China."

Following regulations enacted in December 2025, all clergy must surrender their passports to the CCPA or the China Christian Council.

As of 2026, Catholic religious practice in China generally occurs in its traditional geographic areas (such as Hebei, Shaanxi, Shanxi, Inner Mongolia, Tianjin, Shanghai, and Fujian), where Catholic practice dates to the Qing dynasty or earlier. Catholic practice is primarily not significant outside of these traditional areas.

=== Detained clergy ===
Several Vatican-approved Catholic bishops who have refused to join the CCPA have been placed under house arrest or in indefinite detention, such as Joseph Xing Wenzhi, Melchior Shi Hongzhen, Joseph Zhang Weizhu, Peter Shao Zhumin, James Su Zhi-min, Julius Jia Zhiguo, Augustine Cui Tai, Vincent Guo Xijin, and Thaddeus Ma Daqin.

=== Diplomatic relations with the Vatican ===
A recurring issue in the bilateral relationship is the procedure for appointing Catholic bishops in mainland China. This is the most important issue in the bilateral relationship from the perspective of the Vatican. Since the 1950s, the Chinese government's position is that bishops in China should be elected by Chinese Catholics through the Chinese Catholic Patriotic Association (CCPA). The CCPA's position is that the election of bishops by the church is consistent with ancient church practice. The CCPA is part of the united front system. Through this process, the CCP has ultimate control over the appointment of Bishops. The Vatican's position is that the appointment of bishops is the prerogative of the Pope. By the terms of the canon law of the Catholic Church, the Chinese bishops and people who actively participate in their ordination would be automatically excommunicated, a result called latae sententiae. The Vatican has never announced any such excommunications. Instead, the Vatican describes the ordination of the Chinese bishops as valid but illicit. This means that in the Vatican's view, the Chinese bishops are in fact bishops, but the process through which they are appointed is sinful. In 2018, the Chinese government and the Holy See reached a provisional agreement on the appointment of bishops. The provisional agreement was renewed in 2022 and 2024.

Some, including Hong Kong Cardinal Joseph Zen, saw the progress between Vietnam and Vatican officials towards re-establishing full diplomacy as a model for Sino-Vatican normalization of relations. By late 2004, prior to the death of Pope John Paul II, Vatican and Chinese government representatives were in contact with the apparent goal of moving closer to the normalization of relations. In late 2004, John Paul II received a "quasi-official" Chinese delegation in the Vatican.

In a further sign of rapprochement between the Vatican and Beijing, Pope Benedict XVI invited four Chinese bishops, including two government recognized bishops, one underground bishop, and one underground bishop recently emerged into the official church, to the October 2005 Synod on the Eucharist.

By 2007, the Vatican had indicated on multiple occasions that it desired to establish full diplomatic relations with China, and would be willing to move its embassy from Taiwan to mainland China if necessary.

In May 2007, Pope Benedict XVI wrote an open letter to all Chinese Catholics, stating that there is one Catholic Church in China and that despite the two communities (i.e. the "Patriotic" Church and the "Underground" Church) there is no schism between them. Benedict XVI stated that sacraments performed by the priests not in unity with the Vatican were valid but also illicit. He stated that the Catholic Church accepts the legitimacy of the civil authorities in secular matters and that the Pope has authority in ecclesial matters, and therefore the involvement of the CCPA in the appointment of bishops (and its bishops' conference) violated Catholic doctrine. The letter also removed the permission granted by the Vatican in 1978 to the Underground church to appoint bishops without Vatican approval. Benedict XVI wrote that the large majority of bishops in China had been reconciled with the Vatican.

Underground bishop Joseph Wei Jingyi of Qiqihar released a two-page pastoral letter in July 2007, asking his congregation to study and act on the letter of Pope Benedict XVI and naming the letter a "new milestone in the development of the Chinese Church." In September 2007, a coadjutor bishop for the Guiyang Diocese was jointly appointed by the Vatican and the Chinese official Catholic church.

==== 2018 agreement and subsequent renewals ====
On 22 September 2018, the Holy See and China signed a two-year "Provisional Agreement between the Holy See and the People's Republic of China on the appointment of Bishops", which was initially set to expire on 22 October 2020. According to the communiqué released by the Holy See Press Office, the Provisional Agreement aimed to create "conditions for great collaboration at the bilateral level." This was the first time that an agreement of cooperation has been jointly signed by the Holy See and China. The exact terms of the Provisional Agreement have not been publicly released but people who are familiar with the agreement stated that it allowed for the Holy See to review bishop candidates recommended by the government-sanctioned Chinese Catholic Patriotic Association (CCPA) prior to appointment and consecration. The Provisional Agreement granted veto power to the Holy See when reviewing the bishop nominees that the CCPA has put forward. Anthony Yao Shun, bishop of Jining, was the first bishop appointed under the framework of the Provisional Agreement. Pope Francis readmitted seven bishops appointed by the government without Pontifical mandate to full ecclesial communion in addition to the new appointments.

While the agreement is viewed by the Holy See as an opportunity to increase their presence in China, many thought that it diminished the Holy See's authority over the local church because it shared decision-making powers with an authoritarian government. Cardinal Joseph Zen, former archbishop of Hong Kong, strongly opposed the deal, stating that the agreement is an incredible betrayal of the Catholics in China. As a response to the criticism, Pope Francis wrote a message to the Catholics of China and to the Universal Church on 26 September 2018 to provide context on how to view the Provisional Agreement. Pope Francis recognized that the Provisional Agreement is experimental in nature and will not resolve other conflicts between the Holy See and China, but it will allow for both parties to "act more positively for the orderly and harmonious growth of the Catholic community in China." China, on its part, also positively views the agreement, stating that it is willing to "further enhance understanding with the Vatican side and accumulate mutual trust, so that the momentum of active interaction between the two sides will continue to move forward." Despite strong opposition from the United States and conservative Catholics, the Holy See and China extended the Provisional Agreement.

In November 2020, a month after the Provisional Agreement was extended, China released the revised "Administrative Measures for Religious Clergy." The enforcement of the new rules took effect on 1 May 2021. The Administrative Measures prioritize the Sinicization of all religion. Religious professionals are obligated to carry out their duties within the scope provided by the laws, regulations and rules of the government. The new rules do not consider the collaborative process set in place by the Provisional Agreement between the Holy See and China when appointing bishops. In Article XVI of the Administrative Measures, Catholic bishops are to be approved and consecrated by the government-sanctioned Chinese Catholic Bishops Conference. The document does not state that collaboration and approval from the Holy See to appoint bishops is required, going against the terms of the Provisional Agreement. Just a month before the release of the new rules, Foreign Ministry Spokesperson Zhao Lijian had stated that China is willing to work together with the Vatican "to maintain close communication and consultation and advance the improvement of bilateral ties" through the Provisional Agreement.

In a communiqué released by the Holy See on 22 October 2020, the Holy See and China entered into a note verbale agreement to extend the Provisional Agreement for an additional two years, remaining in effect until 22 October 2022. In July 2022, Pope Francis stated that he hoped the Provisional Agreement would be renewed, describing the agreement as "moving well." As of July 2022, six new bishops had been appointed under the agreement.

According to Catholic charity Aid to the Church in Need, at least 20 priests were under arrest at some point in 2023, some of whom had been missing for several years.

In October 2024, the provisional agreement was renewed for another four years.

Pope Leo XIV made his first appointment pursuant to the agreement in June 2025, nominating Bishop Joseph Lin Yuntuan as auxiliary bishop of Fuzhou. The Vatican described the appointment as "a further fruit of the dialogue between the Holy See and the Chinese authorities and [it] is a significant step in the diocese's communal journey."

Chinese Catholics in the CCPA generally view the agreement positively, on the rationale that they are in full communion with the Vatican as a result. The provisional agreement resulted in a decline of the "underground" church, according to academic Yanfei Sun of Zhejiang University.

=== Demographics ===
As of 1918, there were approximately 2 million Chinese Catholics.

The number of Catholics is hard to estimate because of the large number of Christians who do not affiliate with either of the two state-approved denominations.

The 2010 Blue Book of Religions, produced by the Institute of World Religions at the Chinese Academy of Social Sciences, a research institution directly under the State Council, estimated Catholics in China to number about 5.7 million. This Chinese government estimate only included members of the Chinese Catholic Patriotic Association (CCPA). It did not include un-baptized persons attending Christian groups, non-adult children of Christian believers or other persons under age 18, and unregistered Christian groups.

The Holy Spirit Study Centre in Hong Kong, which monitors the number of Chinese Catholic members, estimated in 2012 that there were 12 million Catholics in both branches of the Catholic Church.

In 2017 Hebei Province had the largest Catholic Christian population in China, with 1 million Church members according to the local government. Generally, Catholic institutions were dominant in North and Central regions of China.

Estimates in 2020 suggested that Catholics make up 0.69% of the population.

=== Hong Kong and Macau ===
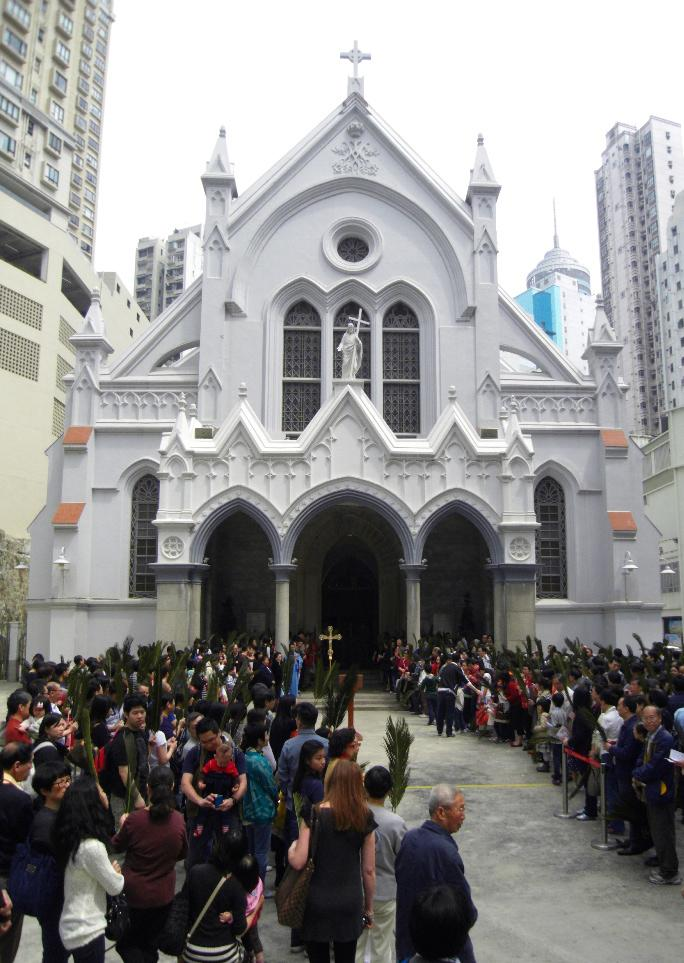
Cathedral of the Immaculate Conception in Hong Kong

The Catholic Church is allowed to operate freely in Macau and Hong Kong. Notably, John Lee Ka-chiu, the current chief executive of Hong Kong, and two former chief executives, Donald Tsang and Carrie Lam, are Catholic. However, Pope John Paul II was denied a visit (which was deemed "inappropriate") to Hong Kong in 1999, by then chief executive Tung Chee Hwa, who was in office from 1997 to 2005, a decision many believe was made under pressure from the central PRC government. The two territories are organized into the Diocese of Hong Kong and the Diocese of Macau.

== See also ==
- Boxers and Saints, American graphic novel featuring Chinese Catholics in the Boxer Rebellion era
- Chinese Orthodox Church
- Chinese Regional Bishops' Conference of Taiwan
- Christianity in China
- Underground church
- House church (China)
- Ignatius Kung Pin-mei, Cardinal Kung
  - Cardinal Kung Foundation
- List of cathedrals in China
- List of Catholic dioceses in China
- List of Catholic missionaries to China
- Martyr Saints of China
- Protestantism in China
- Religion in China
- Catholic Church in Sichuan
- Catholic Church in Shaanxi
- Catholic Church in Taiwan
- Three Pillars of Chinese Catholicism
