= Ad Apostolorum principis =

1958 encyclical

Ad Apostolorum principis Latin for 'At the Prince of the Apostles' Encyclical of Pope Pius XII
- Signature date: 29 June 1958
- Subject: On Communism and the Church in China
- Number: 40 of 41 of the pontificate
- Text: In Latin; In English

Ad Apostolorum principis is an encyclical of Pope Pius XII, dated 29 June 1958, on Communism and the Church in China. It describes systematic persecutions of bishops, priests, religious and faithful and the attempts of the government to establish a patriotic Catholic Church, independent of Rome.

== Background ==
Pope Pius XII issued in 1952 the encyclical Cupimus Imprimis, in which he accused the persecutors and defended the Catholic Church ("a stranger to no people on earth, much less hostile to any") against the accusation of being against the people of China.

In 1954, he published another Encyclical Letter, Ad Sinarum gentem, in which he rejected accusations made against Catholics in China, stating that they are loyal and faithful to their country.

== Content ==
=== Present problems ===
Since that time, the Church in China underwent even more difficulties. A "patriotic" Catholic movement is forced by every means on all the faithful. A movement for patriotism and peace, who can be against that, asks Pius, is in reality just a fraud. This association aims primarily at making Catholics gradually embrace the tenets of atheistic materialism. All are forced to approve and participate and those bishops, priests, religious men, nuns, and the faithful in considerable numbers, who do not participate, are already in prison; Priests, religious men and women, ecclesiastical students, and faithful of all ages are forced to attend courses and an almost endless series of lectures and discussions, lasting for weeks and months, in order to weaken the strength of mind and will, by a kind of psychic coercion. Under such circumstances, every Christian should cast aside all doubt and calmly and firmly repeat the words with which Peter and the other Apostles answered the first persecutors of the Church: "We must obey God rather than men."

=== Illegal consecrations ===
Pius speaks out against those, who elect and appoint bishops of their own political willing, without any consultation with the Holy See. Many such elections have been held contrary to all Church laws. Some priests have rashly dared to receive Episcopal consecration, despite the public and severe warning of the Apostolic See. He declares, that "bishops who have been neither named nor confirmed by the Apostolic See but who, on the contrary, have been elected and consecrated in defiance of its express orders, enjoy no powers of teaching or of jurisdiction since jurisdiction passes to bishops only through the Roman Pontiff". Acts requiring the power of Holy Orders which are performed by ecclesiastics of this kind, though they are valid as long as the consecration conferred on them was valid, are yet gravely illicit, that is, criminal and sacrilegious.

Consequently, for illegal consecrations, an excommunication reserved specialissimo modo to the Apostolic See has been established which is automatically incurred by the consecrator and by anyone who has received consecration irresponsibly conferred.

=== Prayers and hope ===
In cordial, emotional words, the Pope assures his bishops, priests and faithful of his daily commemoration during his morning mass and comforts them:

Be constant then and put your trust in Him according to the words: Cast all your anxiety upon Him, because He cares for you. He sees clearly your anguish and your torments. He particularly finds acceptable the grief of soul and the tears which many of you, bishops and priests, religious and laymen, pour forth in secret when they behold the efforts of those who are striving to subvert the Christians among you. These tears, these bodily pains and tortures, the blood of the martyrs of past and present—all will bring it about that, through the powerful intervention of Mary, the Virgin Mother of God, Queen of China, the Church in your native land will at long last regain its strength and in a calmer age, happier days will shine upon it.
