= Joseph Zhang =

Joseph Zhang is the name of:

- Joseph Zhang Dapeng (1754–1815), Roman Catholic martyr during the Qing dynasty
- Joseph Zhang Xianwang (born 1965), Chinese Roman Catholic priest
- Joseph Zhang Weizhu (born 1967), Chinese Roman Catholic priest
- Joseph Zhang Yinlin (born 1971), Chinese Roman Catholic priest
- Joseph Chang (born 1983), Taiwanese actor

== See also ==
- Joe Cheung (born 1944), Hong Kong filmmaker and actor
