= Francis An Shuxin =

Chinese bishop

- Bishop of Baoding
- Church: Catholic Church
- Diocese: Diocese of Baoding
- Appointed: 7 August 2010
- Previous posts: Coadjutor Bishop of Baoding (2007-2010); Administrator of Baoding (2006-2010); Auxiliary Bishop of Baoding (1993-2007)

Orders
- Ordination: 7 January 1981
- Consecration: 2 May 1993 by Peter Liu Guandong

Personal details
- Born: 16 July 1949 (age 77)

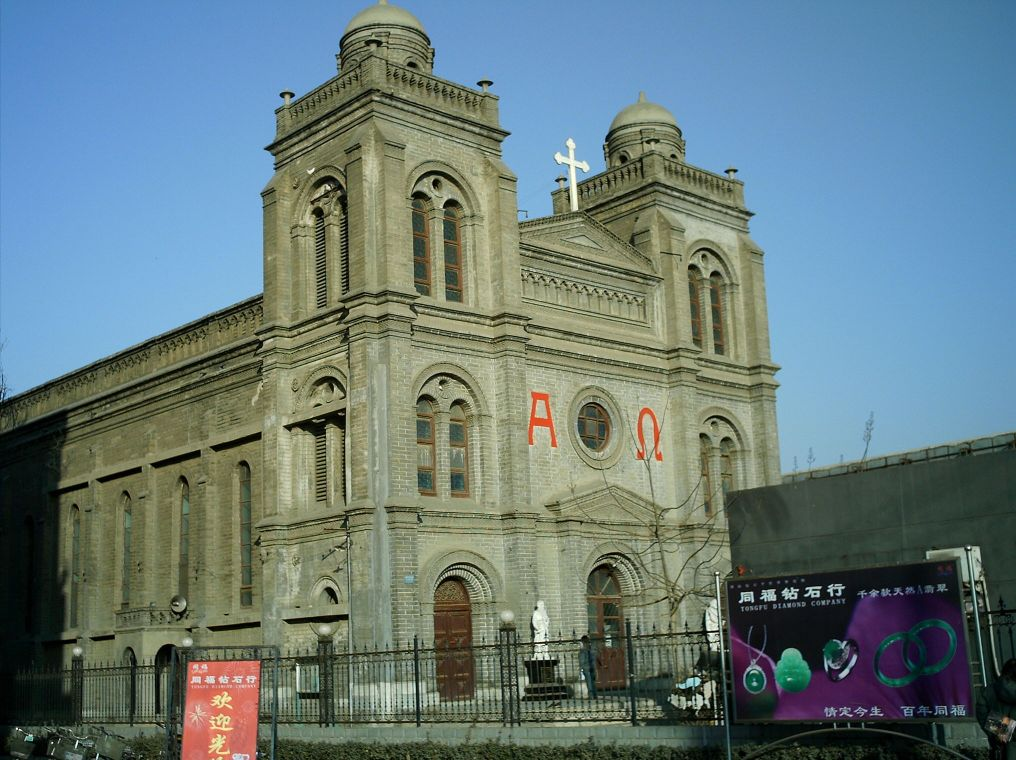
Baoding Cathedral

Francis An Shuxin (simplified Chinese: 安树新; traditional Chinese: 安樹新; pinyin: Ān Shùxīn; born 16 July 1949) is a Chinese Catholic prelate who has served as de facto Bishop of Baoding since 2010.

== Episcopacy ==
Shuxin received consecration by Bishop Peter Liu Guandong on May 2, 1993, as the Auxiliary Bishop of Baoding Diocese. He was then a member of the underground Chinese Catholic community, which rejects the government's Chinese Catholic Patriotic Association.

Shuxin was arrested on October 8, 1997, by the Chinese government, along with Su Zhi-Min. He was released in 2006.

He was appointed Coadjutor Bishop of Baoding in 2007, joining the government-sanctioned CCPA. His joining the state-sanctioned church antagonized many in the "underground" community who had previously viewed him as a key figure of resistance.

With the consent of the government, he was installed as Bishop of Baoding on August 7, 2010.

== External links and additional sources ==
- Cheney, David M. "Diocese of Baoding [Paoting, Ching-Yüan]". Catholic-Hierarchy.org. ^{[self-published]}
- Chow, Gabriel. "Diocese of Baoding 保定". GCatholic.org. ^{[self-published]}
