= Underground church =

Catholic churches in the People's Republic of China that are not state-sanctioned

The term underground church (Chinese: 地下教会; pinyin: dìxià jiàohuì) is used to refer to Chinese Catholic churches in the People's Republic of China which have chosen not to associate with the Chinese Catholic Patriotic Association (CCPA) of the United Front Work Department of the Central Committee of the Chinese Communist Party; they are also called loyal church (Chinese: 忠贞教会; pinyin: zhōngzhēn jiàohuì). "Underground" does not mean the underground church is secret (in contemporary China, the community mostly operates openly) but refers to its lack of official approval and lack of official support. Underground churches came into existence in the 1950s, after the Chinese Communist Party's proclamation of the People's Republic of China, due to the severing of ties between Chinese Catholics and the Holy See.

Beginning in the 1990s, the Vatican encouraged unity between the "Underground" and the state-sanctioned "Patriotic" church. In May 2007, Pope Benedict XVI wrote an open letter to all Chinese Catholics, stating that there is one Catholic Church in China and that despite the two communities (i.e. the "Patriotic" Church and the "Underground" Church) there is no schism between them. Benedict XVI stated that sacraments performed by the priests not in unity with the Vatican were valid but also illicit. He stated that the Catholic Church accepts the legitimacy of the civil authorities in secular matters and that the Pope has authority in ecclesial matters, and therefore the involvement of the Chinese Catholic Patriotic Association in the appointment of bishops (and its bishops conference) violated Catholic doctrine. The letter also removed the permission granted by the Vatican in 1978 to the Underground church to appoint bishops without Vatican approval.

There continue to be tensions between underground churches and "open churches" which have joined the state-sanctioned CCPA. Underground churches have remained loyal to the Vatican during decades of antireligious campaigns and have been under increased pressure during the general secretaryship of Xi Jinping.

== Terminology ==
The description of an "underground church" reflects language that was made popular during the Cold War, when these churches came about. Underground churches are also sometimes referred to as "Vatican loyalists" because they have attempted to remain loyal to the Pope and the Holy See. There is no established organization structure of underground churches, though they tend to be clustered around a number of Vatican-ordained bishops. From 1978 until 2007, the Vatican permitted the underground church to ordain new bishops without Vatican approval.

In 1989, underground churches formed the Bishops Conference of Mainland China (Chinese: 天主教中国大陆主教团; pinyin: Tiānzhǔjiào Zhōngguó Dàlù Zhǔjiào Tuán) as separate from the state-sanctioned Bishops' Conference of Catholic Church in China (Chinese: 中国天主教主教团; pinyin: Zhōngguó Tiānzhǔjiào Zhǔjiào Tuán), which was established in 1980.

Chinese Catholics associated with underground churches are often seen in contrast with the Chinese Catholics associated with the CCPA, often termed "open churches" (Chinese: 地上教会; pinyin: dìshàng jiàohuì; lit. 'above ground church'), which are officially independent of the Holy See. The CCPA is controlled by the United Front Work Department (UFWD) of the Central Committee of the Chinese Communist Party following the State Administration for Religious Affairs' absorption into the UFWD during a series of institutional reforms in 2018.

"Underground" does not mean the underground church is secret (in contemporary China, the community mostly operates openly) but refers to its lack of official approval and lack of official support.

Protestant churches in China which have not joined the state-sanctioned Protestant church, the Three-Self Patriotic Movement, are generally termed house churches rather than underground churches.

== History ==
Few male religious orders (such as the Franciscans and the Society of the Divine Word) were active in the "Underground" church and their influence was limited.

Beginning in the 1990s, the Vatican began promoting unity between the "Patriotic" and "Underground" churches. As part of this effort, it encouraged "Underground" church leaders to take positions in the "Patriotic" church. This reduced some tensions between the "Patriotic" and "Underground" churches, increased Vatican influence in the "Patriotic" church, and decreased the influence of the "Underground" church generally. Among those who joined the "Patriotic" church was An Shuxin, "Underground" auxiliary bishop of Diocese of Baoding who had been regarded by many in the "Underground" church as a key figure of resistance.

In May 2007, Pope Benedict XVI wrote an open letter to all Chinese Catholics, stating that there is one Catholic Church in China and that despite the two communities (i.e. the "Patriotic" Church and the "Underground" Church) there is no schism between them. Benedict XVI stated that sacraments performed by the priests not in unity with the Vatican were valid but also illicit. He stated that the Catholic Church accepts the legitimacy of the civil authorities in secular matters and that the Pope has authority in ecclesial matters, and therefore the involvement of the Chinese Catholic Patriotic Association in the appointment of bishops (and its bishops conference) violated Catholic doctrine. The letter also removed the permission granted by the Vatican in 1978 to the Underground church to appoint bishops without Vatican approval.

There continue to be tensions between underground churches and "open churches" which have joined the state-sanctioned CCPA. In 2016, Xi Jinping announced a campaign to "sinicize" the country's religions.

In 2018, the Holy See and the PRC signed a provisional agreement on the appointment of bishops. The provisional agreement resulted in a decline of the "underground" church, according to academic Yanfei Sun of Zhejiang University. In the 2020s, Catholics in the PRC are under increased pressure to join the CCPA, according to Human Rights Watch.

== See also ==
- Protestant house church
- China–Holy See relations
- Antireligious campaigns in China
