= Chinese Catholic Bishops' Conference =

National religious body in the PRC

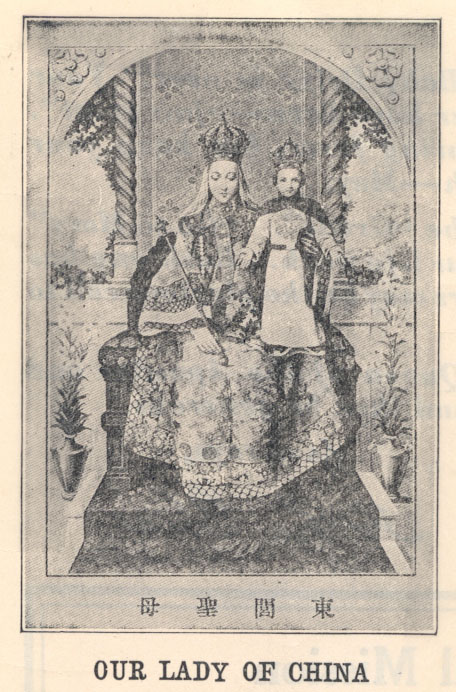
Our Lady of Donglü, 1900 (not to be confused with the 1995 apparitions)

The Chinese Catholic Bishops' Conference (中国天主教主教团; Zhongguo tianzhujiao zhujiao tuan) is the national religious body of the Catholic Church in the People's Republic of China. It was created in 1980 to work with the Chinese Catholic Patriotic Association and the Chinese Church Administrative Committee on behalf of the bishops.

== History ==
=== Background ===
Following the founding of the People's Republic of China, the Catholic Church in China developed into two communities. The "patriotic" church operates with approval of Chinese authorities and while the "underground" church does not and puts emphasis on loyalty to the pope. "Underground" does not mean the underground church is secret (in contemporary China, the community mostly operates openly) but refers to its lack of official approval and lack of official support. The Chinese Catholic Bishop's Conference is an official body of the patriotic church.

A recurring issue for China-Holy See relations is the procedure for appointing bishops in mainland China. Since the 1950s, the Chinese government's position is that bishops in China should be elected by Chinese Catholics through the Chinese Catholic Patriotic Association. In 2018, the Chinese government and the Holy See reached a provisional agreement on the appointment of bishops, which was renewed in 2022 and 2024.

=== History ===
The Chinese Catholic Bishops' Conference was created in 1980 (along with the Chinese Church Administrative Committee), following the Third National Conference of the Chinese Catholic Church. With some of the Chinese Catholic Patriotic Association's roles given to these new bodies, it was envisioned that the CCPA would be a connection between church and government, with the Chinese Catholic Bishops' Conference representing the bishops and the Chinese Church Administrative Committee would handle the internal affairs of the church, and in turn by led by the Chinese Catholic Representatives Conference. On 3 June 1980, the CCBC issued A Decision Concerning the Reaffirmation of the Clergy's Faculties to Administer the Sacraments. This decision was a response to a 1978 document issued by the Vatican Congregation for the Evangelisation of Peoples, which in light of the lack of priests and bishops in China which the Vatican deemed licit, granted special latitude to priests in administering the sacraments in mainland China. In contrast to the Vatican position, the CCBC's decision stated that "every cleric's faculties to administer the sacraments must be approved by the bishop having ordinary power or the local diocesan leader." The CCBC decision also restricted foreign missionary work, requiring that "[t]he faculties to administer the sacraments or to engage in missionary work of a cleric who is visiting China from abroad must be granted by the bishop having ordinary power or the local diocesan leader."

In 1981, the CCBC along with the Chinese Church Administrative Committee issued further regulations which they described as efforts to prevent "bad elements from carrying out local activities," including that "clerics must administer the sacraments and offer Mass in the territory determined" by their local administrative committee and bishop or diocesan head. This also responded to the 1978 Vatican document, which had given special permission to priests in China to operate outside their ordinary geographic requirements. Likewise, clerics who sought to offer Mass or perform the sacraments outside of churches needed to obtain permission to do so. The regulations also stated that priests who were convicted of crimes or lost their political rights also lost their faculty to perform the sacraments.

The 1981 regulations opposed the simplifications of the sacraments authorised by the Vatican for use in China and stated that "clergy must observe the traditional church regulations regarding ceremonies, the administration of the seven sacraments, and the offering of Mass" unless approved by the CCBC and the Chinese Church Administrative Committee. The 1981 regulations stated that before consecrating a bishop, permission from the local administrative committee was required.

In February 1989, the central government issued Document No. 3 (Stepping up Control Over the Catholic Church to Meet the New Situation), a response to the Catholic Church's role in undermining Communism in eastern Europe. Regarding the CCBC, Document No. 3 stated that the body should be strengthened to become the essence of the church and to uphold its autonomy. It stated that the Chinese Church Administrative Committee would now be a committee of the CCBC, rather than a separate national organisation.

== See also ==
- Laws regarding religious activities in China
- List of Catholic dioceses in China
- Episcopal conference
