= Peter and Paul Cathedral (Baoding) =

Church building in Baoding, China

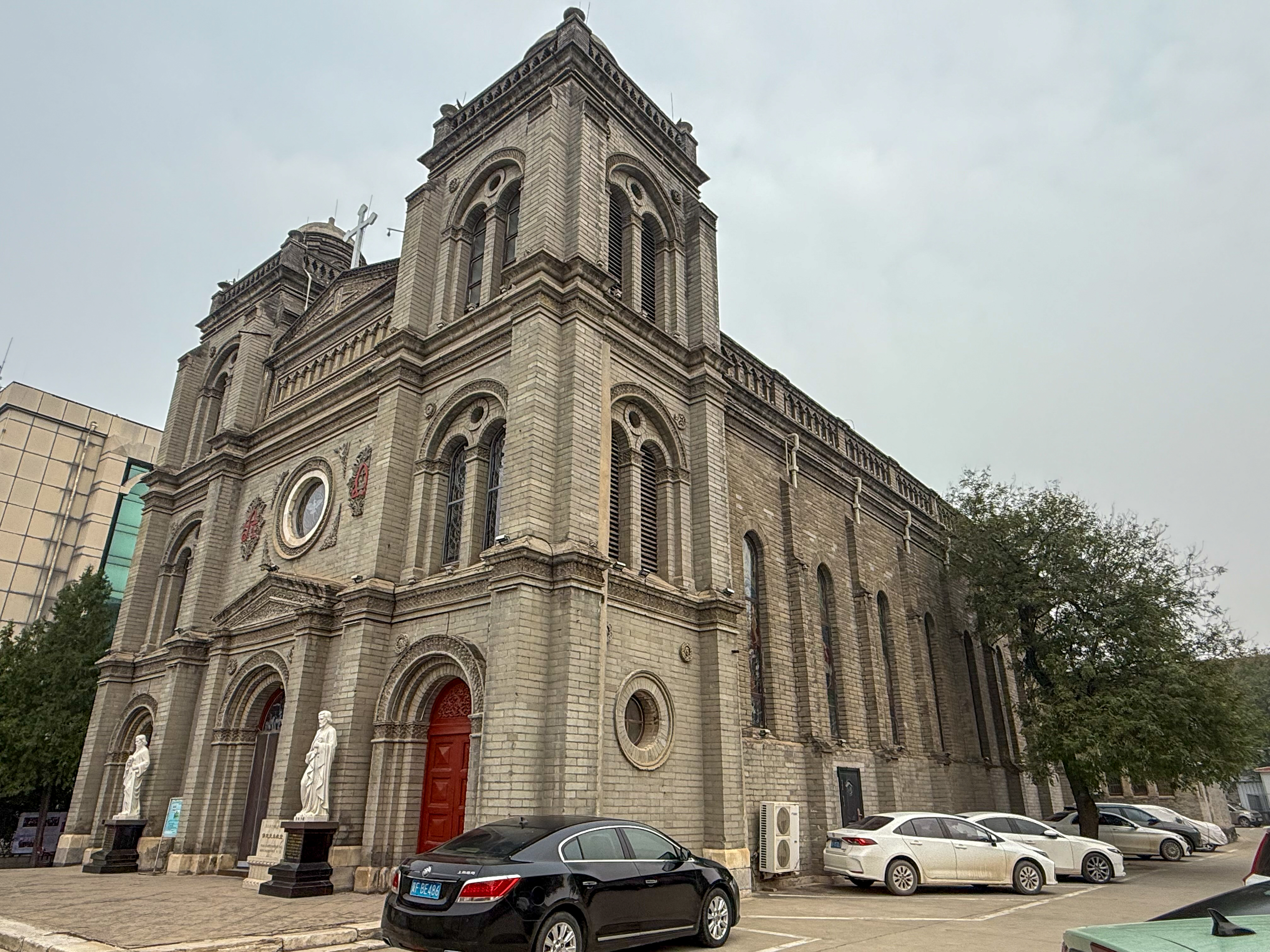
The Cathedral

Saints Peter and Paul Cathedral (圣伯多禄圣保禄主教座堂) is the cathedral church of the Diocese of Baoding.

== History ==
In 1900, the Boxer Rebellion took place in northern China, during which the boxers massacred large numbers of Catholics and burned many churches. Catholics in Baoding fled the city, some of them travelling to nearby Donglu, where a supposed Marian apparition took place.

French missionaries returned to Baoding following the rebellion. In 1905 they had this church constructed and dedicated it to Saints Peter and Paul. In 1910, when the diocese of Baoding was created, this church was expanded and became the cathedral church of the diocese.

Today it is listed within the provincial cultural protection sites for Hebei.

== Gallery ==
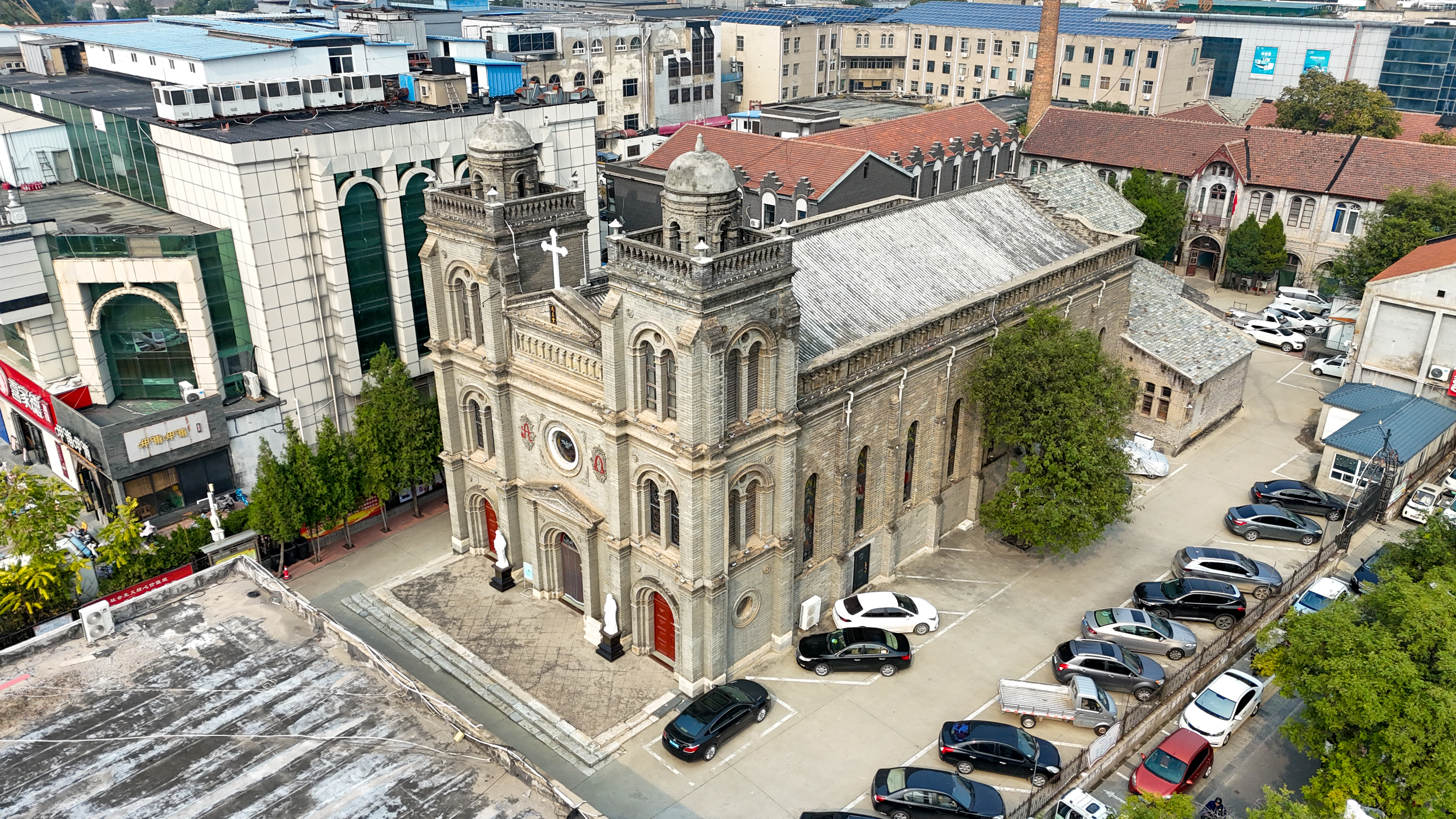
Aerial view

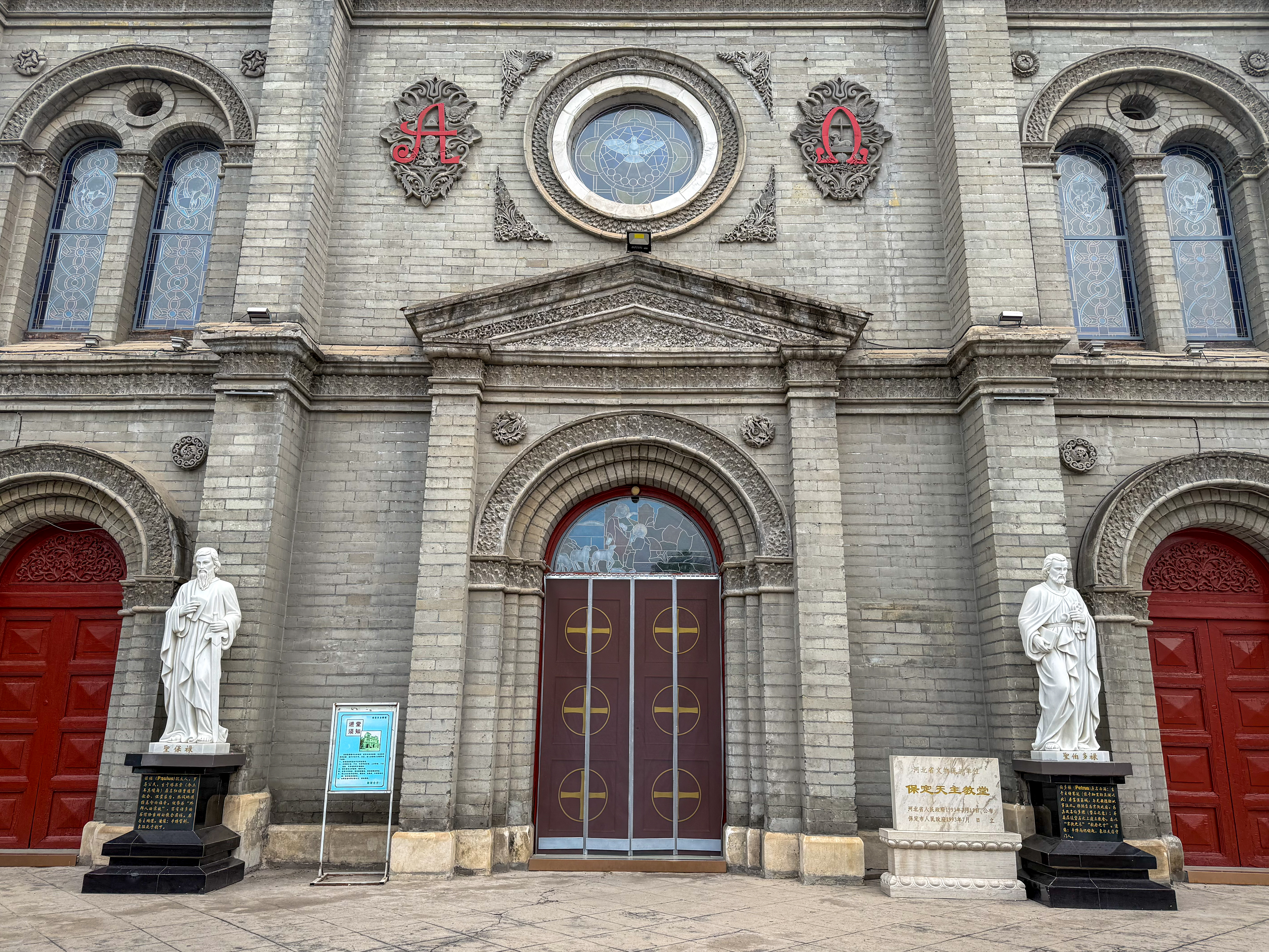
Main entrance

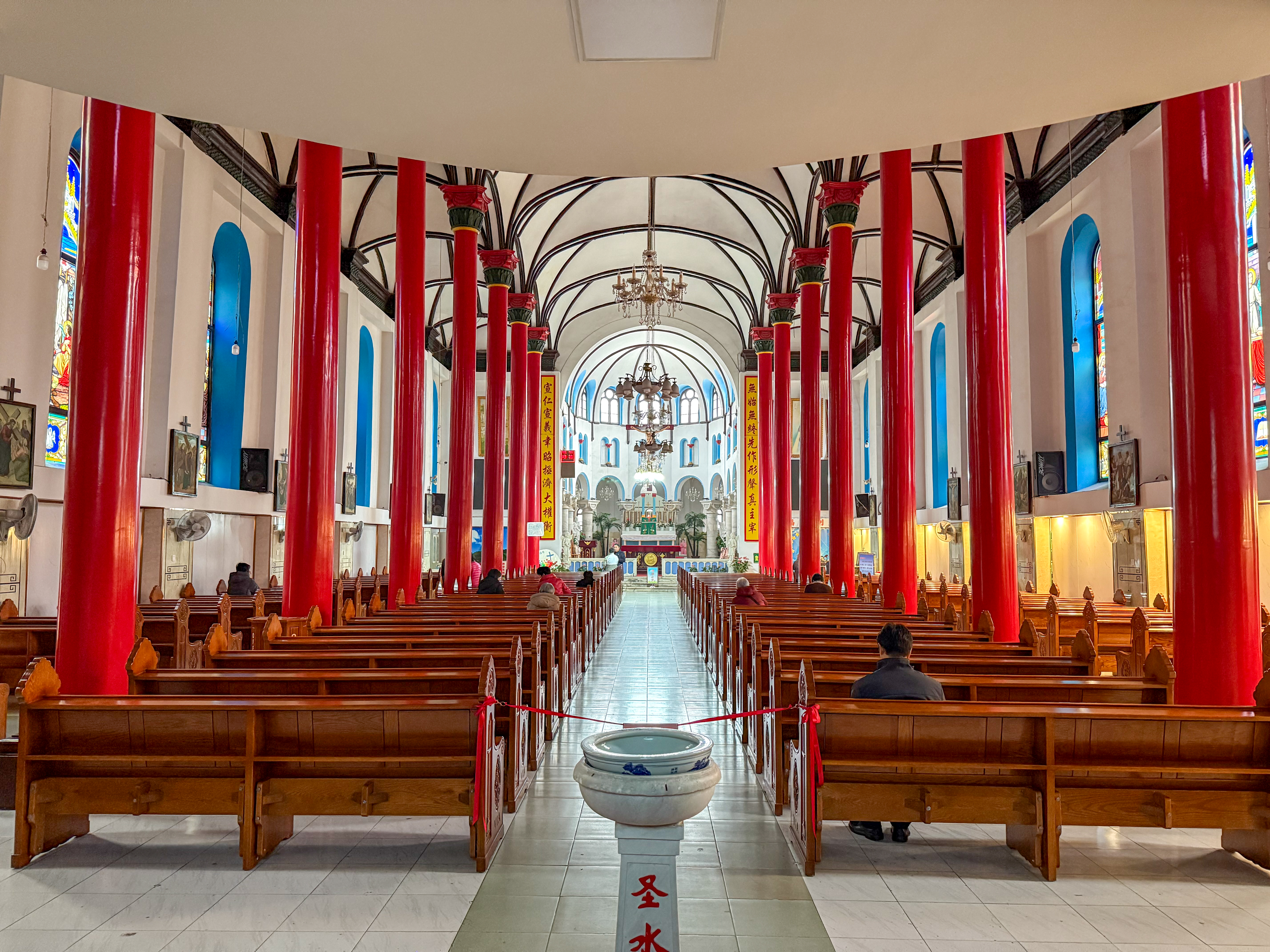
Interior

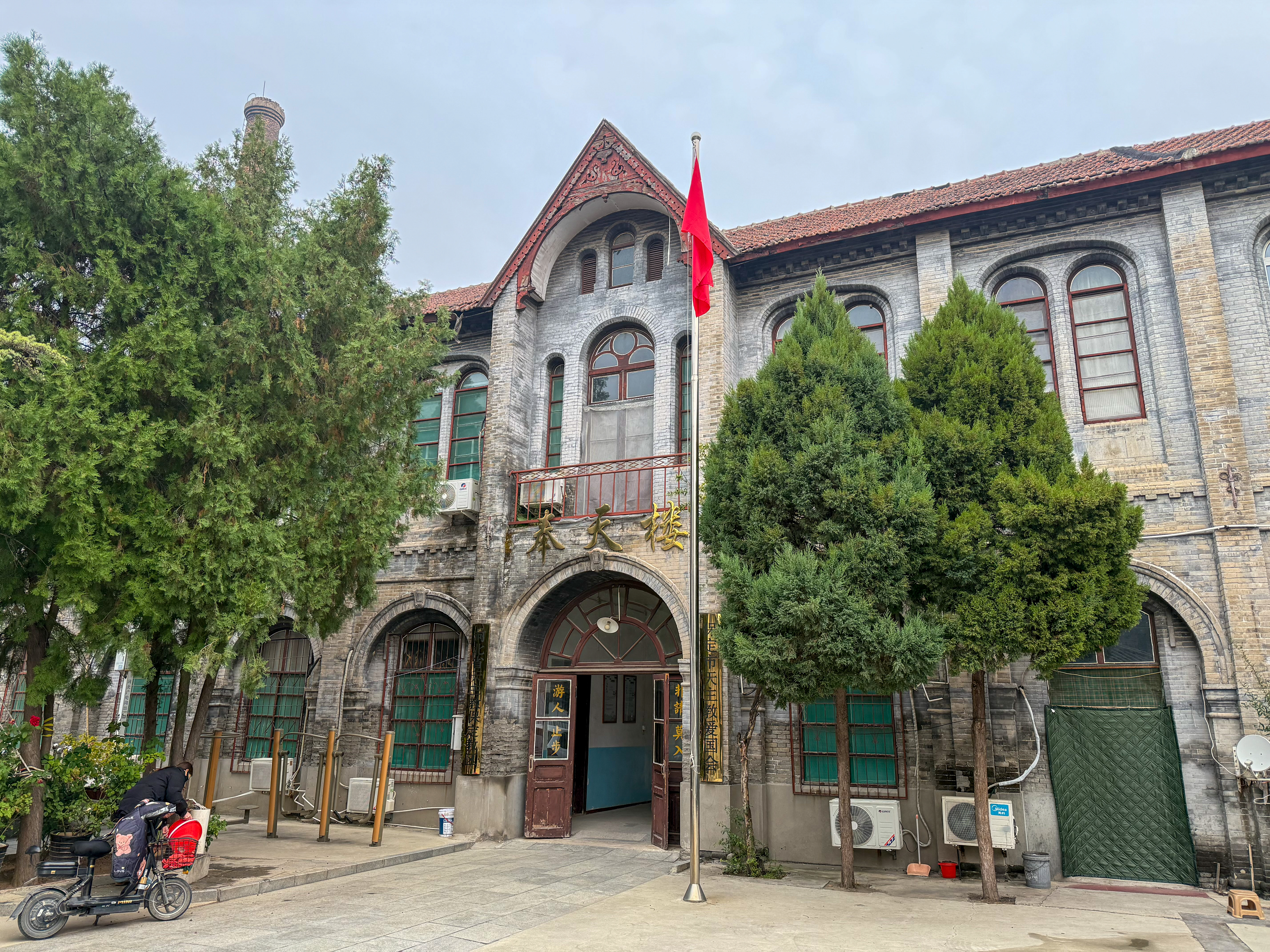
Fengtian Building

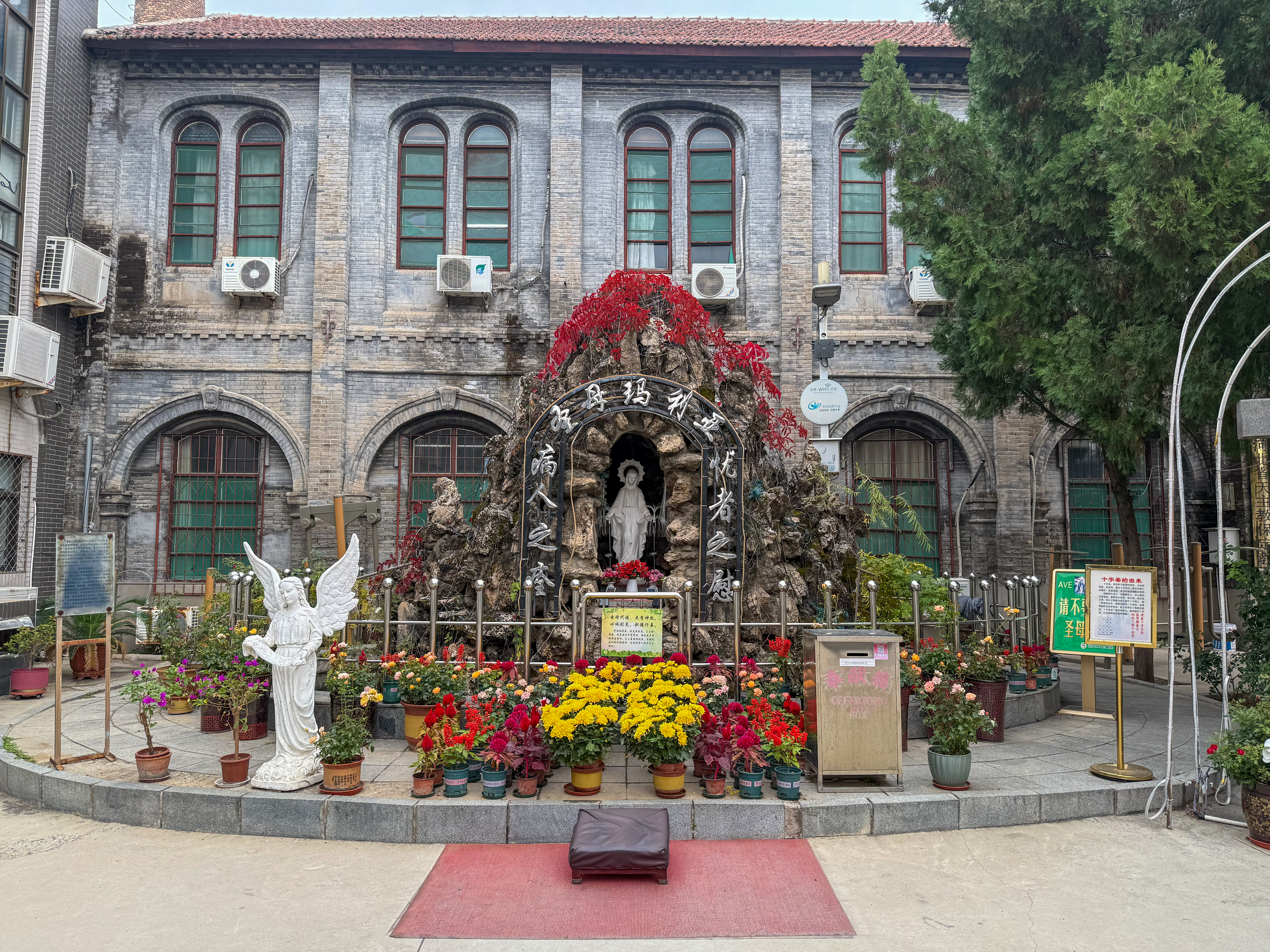
Virgin Mary

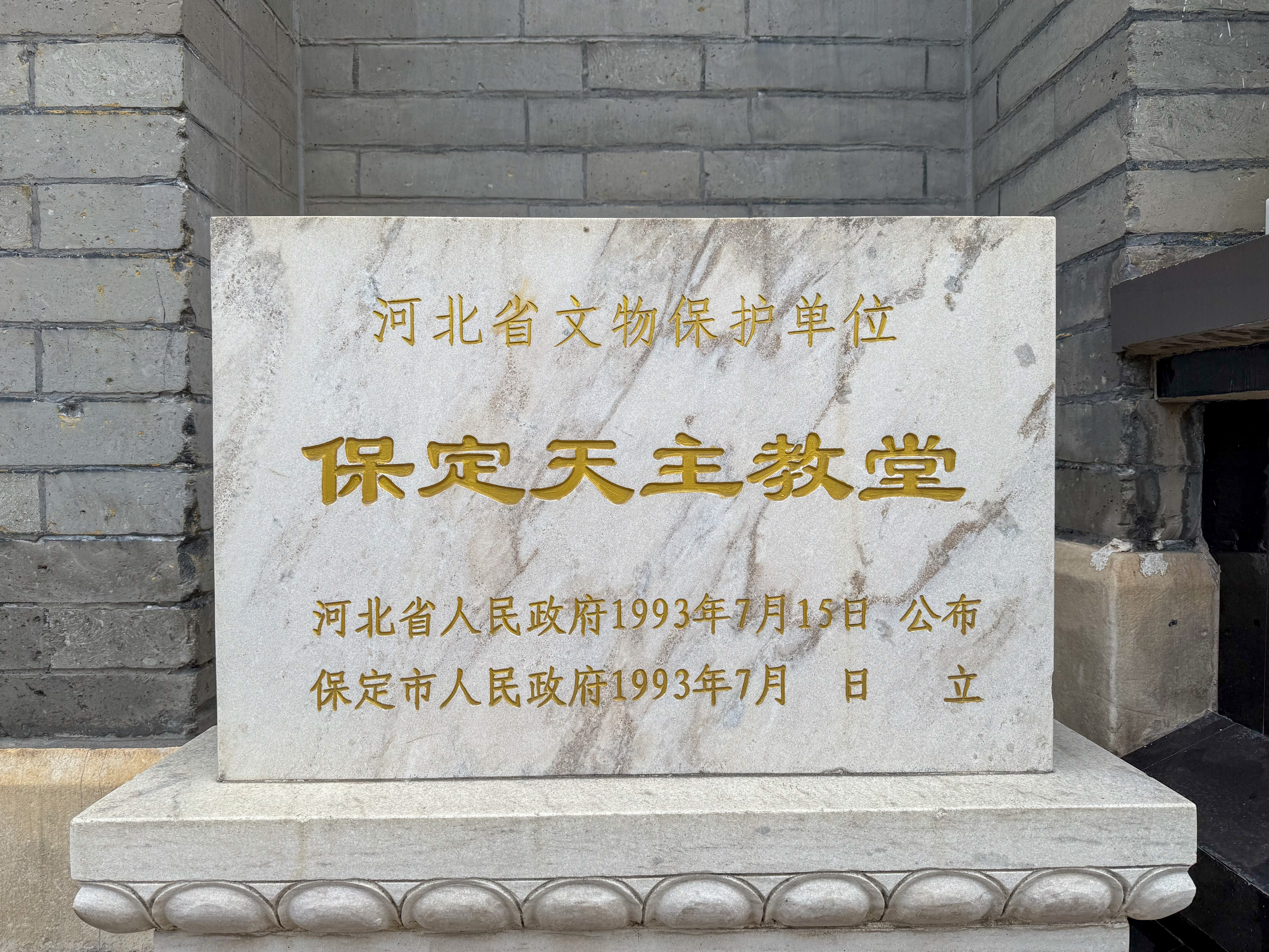
Sign of the Major Historical and Cultural Site
