= Peter Joseph Fan Xueyan =

Roman Catholic bishop of Baoding (1907–1992)

Most Reverend Peter Joseph Fan Xueyan
- Bishop Emeritus of Baoding
- Archdiocese: Beijing
- Diocese: Baoding
- Appointed: 12 April 1951
- Predecessor: Bishop John Zhang Bide
- Successor: Incumbent

Orders
- Ordination: 22 December 1934
- Consecration: 24 June 1951 by Archbishop Giuseppe Ferruccio Maurizio Rosà, O.F.M.

Personal details
- Born: 29 December 1907 Siao Wang Ting, Beijing, China
- Died: 13 April 1992 (aged 84)
- Denomination: Roman Catholic

Peter Joseph Fan Xueyan (Chinese: 范學淹; pinyin: Fàn Xuéyān; December 29, 1907 – April 13, 1992) was a Chinese Roman Catholic priest and bishop who lived in China during the 20th century. He was bishop of the Roman Catholic Diocese of Baoding.

== Biography ==
Fan was born in 1907.

Fan studied in Rome where he was ordained a priest in 1934. He shortly thereafter returned to China to work in the diocese of Baoding. He worked in parishes, schools, seminaries, and in the Catholic Relief Agency during 1937–1951. His work took him to several provinces in China.

The Catholic Church in the People's Republic of China developed into two communities. The patriotic church operates with approval of Chinese authorities and the underground church which emphasizes loyalty to the pope.

He was appointed bishop of Baoding diocese on April 12, 1951, and ordained on June 24 of that year. He was consecrated by the archbishop of Hankou, Giuseppe Ferrucio Maurizio Rosà.

In 1958, Bishop Fan was arrested and sent to a penal farm (a type of forced labour camp). In 1969, he was released to his home village and placed under supervision. He was released in 1979; however, he was arrested again in 1982 for "colluding with foreign forces to jeopardize the sovereignty and security of the motherland" (it was alleged he had had contacts with the Vatican and was secretly ordaining priests in his diocese).

In 1980 and 1981, Fan consecrated bishops for the underground church in China without Vatican approval. According to Fan, "I was not lacking in doing my duty. I ordained a few bishops for China, but I did not receive the Pope's approval before performing the ordinations. If it is against Canon Law, I must announce my crime to the Holy See. I am willing to accept any punishment." Pope John Paul II accepted the ordinations and approved of them after the fact.

He was released in 1987, but placed under house arrest and continually moved around. In November 1990 he went missing and was assumed to have been dead.

== Death ==
Bishop Fan died of pneumonia on April 13, 1992, according to the director of the liaison department of the Catholic Patriotic Association. According to anonymous sources, his body was left at the door of his family home in a plastic body bag. His body was found to have had broken bones and other injuries that may have resulted from torture. He may have been the longest-serving prisoner of conscience in the world. It has been reported that underground Christians have called for his canonization.
