= Weizhu Bao =

Chinese mathematician

- 包维柱
- Born: 1 September 1969; Xunyang County, Shaanxi, China
- Education: Tsinghua University (BS, MS, PhD)
- Known for: Bose-Einstein condensation, highly oscillatory PDEs, multiscale methods, computational mathematics
- Awards: Beijing Science and Technology Award (2003), Feng Kang Prize (2013), Fellow of the American Mathematical Society (2022), Fellow of SIAM (2022)
- Scientific career
- Fields: Applied mathematics
- Workplaces: National University of Singapore
- Doctoral advisor: Houde Han

Weizhu Bao (Chinese: 包维柱; born 1 September 1969) is a Chinese mathematician at the National University of Singapore (NUS). He is known for his work in applied mathematics with applications in quantum physics and chemistry and materials science, especially Bose-Einstein condensation (BEC) and highly oscillatory partial differential equations.

== Biography ==
Bao was born in Xunyang, Shaanxi, China. He completed his undergraduate studies in the Department of Mathematics at Tsinghua University in 1992 and obtained his master's degree and Ph.D. degree under the advice of Houde Han in the Department of Mathematical Sciences at Tsinghua University in 1995. He was subsequently a faculty member at Tsinghua University (1995–2000) with various visiting positions at Imperial College (1996–1997), Georgia Institute of Technology (1998–2000) and University of Wisconsin at Madison (September–December 2000) during the period. He joined the National University of Singapore as an assistant professor in 2001 and became a full professor in 2009.

== Contributions ==
Bao has made contributions to Bose-Einstein condensation (BEC), multiscale methods, computational quantum physics and chemistry, computational fluid dynamics, and computational materials science. In the study of BEC, he and collaborators have established mathematical theory and proposed efficient and accurate computational methods. For highly oscillatory partial differential equations, he and collaborators have developed the uniformly accurate multiscale time integrator method. For solid-state dewetting, he and collaborators have derived sharp interface and phase field models.

== Selected works ==
- Johnson, T. H.; Yuan, Y.; Bao, W.; Clark, S. R.; Foot, C.; Jaksch, D. (14 June 2016). "Hubbard Model for Atomic Impurities Bound by the Vortex Lattice of a Rotating Bose-Einstein Condensate" (PDF). Physical Review Letters. 116 (24) 240402. American Physical Society (APS). arXiv:1512.09334. Bibcode:2016PhRvL.116x0402J. doi:10.1103/physrevlett.116.240402. ISSN 0031-9007. PMID 27367366. S2CID 5592311.
- Bao, Weizhu; Zhao, Xiaofei (28 June 2016). "A uniformly accurate (UA) multiscale time integrator Fourier pseudospectral method for the Klein–Gordon–Schrödinger equations in the nonrelativistic limit regime". Numerische Mathematik. 135 (3). Springer Science and Business Media LLC: 833–873. arXiv:1505.00083. doi:10.1007/s00211-016-0818-x. ISSN 0029-599X. S2CID 253744465.
- Jiang, Wei; Bao, Weizhu; Thompson, Carl V.; Srolovitz, David J. (2012). "Phase field approach for simulating solid-state dewetting problems". Acta Materialia. 60 (15). Elsevier BV: 5578–5592. Bibcode:2012AcMat..60.5578J. doi:10.1016/j.actamat.2012.07.002. ISSN 1359-6454.
- Bao, Weizhu; Du, Qiang (2004). "Computing the Ground State Solution of Bose--Einstein Condensates by a Normalized Gradient Flow". SIAM Journal on Scientific Computing. 25 (5). Society for Industrial & Applied Mathematics (SIAM): 1674–1697. arXiv:cond-mat/0303241. Bibcode:2004SJSC...25.1674B. doi:10.1137/s1064827503422956. ISSN 1064-8275. S2CID 14293581.
- Bao, Weizhu; Jin, Shi; Markowich, Peter A. (2002). "On Time-Splitting Spectral Approximations for the Schrödinger Equation in the Semiclassical Regime". Journal of Computational Physics. 175 (2). Elsevier BV: 487–524. Bibcode:2002JCoPh.175..487B. doi:10.1006/jcph.2001.6956. ISSN 0021-9991.

== Awards and honours ==
The honors that Bao has received include Beijing Science and Technology Award (together with Houde Han etc.) in 2003 and the Feng Kang Prize in Scientific Computing in 2013. He was also an invited speaker at the International Congress of Mathematicians (ICM) in 2014 (Mathematics in Science and Technology section), and at the conference Dynamics, Equations and Applications in Kraków in 2019. He was named a Fellow of the American Mathematical Society, in the 2022 class of fellows, "for contributions to numerical analysis, in particular the numerical solution of partial differential equations and their applications", and as a Fellow of the Society for Industrial and Applied Mathematics, in the 2022 Class of SIAM Fellows, "for modeling and simulation for Bose-Einstein condensation and multiscale methods and analysis for highly oscillatory dispersive PDEs".
