= James Su Zhi-min =

Chinese bishop (1932-)

Most Reverend James Su Zhi-min
- Bishop of Baoding
- Archdiocese: Beijing
- Diocese: Baoding
- Appointed: 21 December 1995
- Predecessor: Peter Joseph Fan Xueyan
- Successor: Incumbent

Orders
- Ordination: 12 April 1981
- Consecration: 2 May 1993 by Bishop Peter Liu Guandong

Personal details
- Born: 10 July 1932 (age 94)
- Denomination: Roman Catholic

James Su Zhi-min is a Chinese Catholic prelate who has served as de jure Bishop of Baoding since 1995. He was forcibly disappeared in 1997.

== Biography ==
James was born on 10 July 1932. He was ordained a priest on 12 April 1981.

James was selected as Auxiliary Bishop of Baoding in 1988. He was selected as Coadjutor Bishop of Baoding and consecrated as bishop on 2 May 1993 by Bishop Peter Liu Guandong. On 21 December 1995, he was appointed Bishop of Baoding. He was a member of the underground Chinese Catholic community, which rejects the government's Chinese Catholic Patriotic Association.

== Arrest and disappearance ==
Following an illicit pilgrimage, Su was imprisoned by the Chinese government in 1997, and his location had remained unknown until November 15, 2003, when he was seen in a Baoding hospital. He has since disappeared from public view once more.

== See also ==
- List of people who disappeared
