= Diocese of Baoding =

Roman Catholic diocese in China

Coordinates: 38.8500°N 115.4830°E

Diocese of Baoding Dioecesis Paotimensis 保定教区
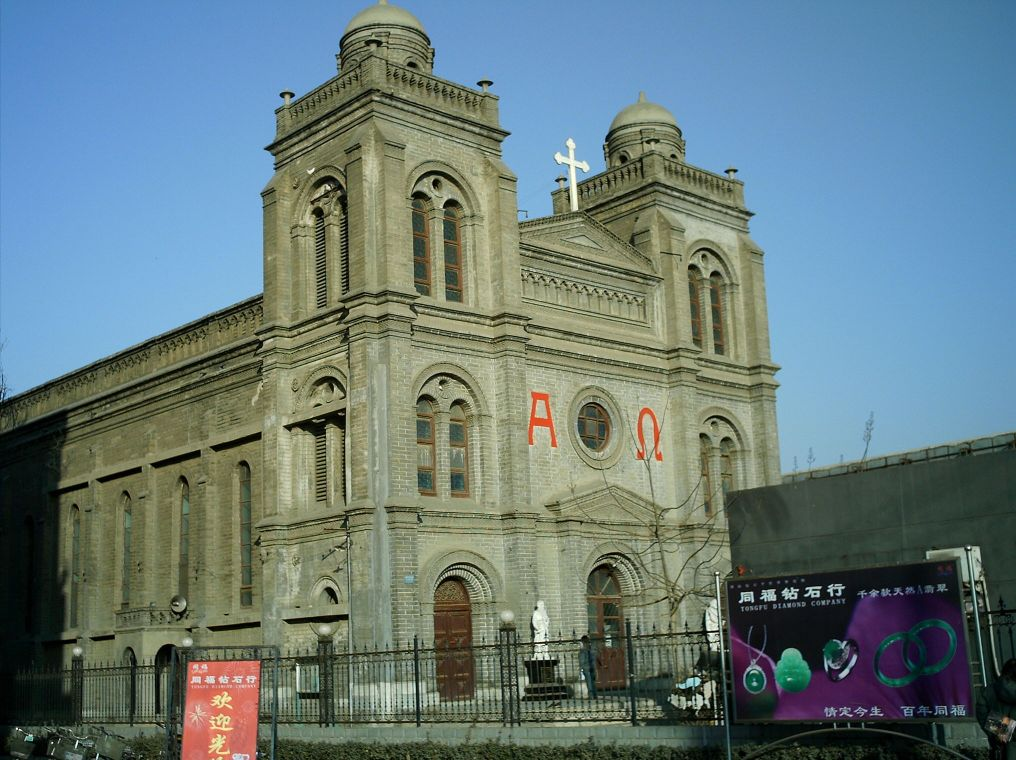
- Baoding Cathedral

Location
- Country: China
- Ecclesiastical province: Beijing

Statistics
- Area: 12,000 km^{2} (4,600 sq mi)
- Population: Total; Catholics: (as of 1950); 2,000,000; 78,601 (3.9%)
- Parishes: 35

Information
- Denomination: Catholic Church
- Sui iuris church: Latin Church
- Rite: Roman Rite
- Established: 14 February 1910; 116 years ago
- Cathedral: Cathedral of Sts Peter and Paul in Baoding

Current leadership
- Pope: Leo XIV
- Bishop: de facto: Francis An Shuxin de jure: James Su Zhi-min
- Metropolitan Archbishop: Joseph Li Shan

The Roman Catholic Diocese of Baoding/Ching-Yüan/Qingyuan (Latin: Paotimen(sis), Chinese: 保定, 青苑) is a diocese located in the city of Baoding in the ecclesiastical province of Beijing in China.

== History ==
- 14 February 1910: Established as the Apostolic Vicariate of Central Chi-Li 直隸中境 from Apostolic Vicariate of Northern Chi-Li 直隸北境
- 3 December 1924: Renamed as Apostolic Vicariate of Baodingfu 保定府
- 11 April 1946: Promoted as Diocese of Baoding 保定

== Special churches ==
- National Shrine:
  - 中华圣母国家朝圣地
    (National Shrine of Our Lady of China), Donglu

== Leadership ==
Bishops of Baoding 保定 (Roman rite)

- Francis An Shuxin (see below 7 August 2010 – Present [de facto]), arrested by the Chinese government in 1997; released in 2006
  - Administrator Francis An Shuxin (December 2006 – 7 August 2010 see above), Auxiliary Bishop of Baoding
- James Su Zhi-min (21 December 1995 – Present [de jure]), disappeared in 1997
  - Administrator Louis Fan Luyi (1992 – 9 June 2004), Bishop-elect of Baoding
- Peter Chen Jianzhang (陳建章) (16 April 1992 – 21 December 1994)
- Peter Joseph Fan Xueyan (范學淹) (12 April 1951 – 16 April 1992)
- John Zhang Bi-de (張弼德) (19 July 1946 – June 1951), while Bishop of Zhaoxian 趙縣
- Joseph Zhou Ji-shi, C.M. (周濟世) (see below 11 April 1946 – 18 July 1946)

Vicars Apostolic of Baodingfu 保定府 (Roman Rite)

- Joseph Zhou Ji-shi, C.M. (周濟世) (26 March 1931 – 11 April 1946 see above)
- Paul Leon Cornelius Montaigne, C.M. (滿德胎) (18 December 1924 – 25 January 1930)

Vicars Apostolic of Central Chi-Li 直隸中境 (Roman Rite)

- Joseph-Sylvain-Marius Fabrègues, C.M. (富成功) (19 February 1910 – 12 June 1923)

Coadjutor Bishops

- Francis An Shuxin (2007-2010)
- John Baptist Su Changshan (2000-2006), died
- James Su Zhi-min (1993-1995)
- Peter Chen Jianzhang (1988-1992)
- Joseph Zhu Yousan (1984-1988), died

Auxiliary Bishops

- Francis An Shuxin (1993-2007)
- Paul Shi Chunjie (1987-1991), died
