= Joseph Zhang Weizhu =

Chinese Catholic bishop

- Bishop of the Roman Catholic Diocese of Xinxiang
- Province: Henan
- Diocese: Roman Catholic Diocese of Xinxiang
- Installed: 1992
- Term ended: 2025

Orders
- Ordination: 1985

Personal details
- Born: 1967 (age 58–59) 1957? China
- Denomination: Roman Catholic

Chinese name
- Traditional Chinese: 張維柱
- Simplified Chinese: 张维柱
Transcriptions
Standard Mandarin
- Hanyu Pinyin: Zhāng Wéizhù

Joseph Zhang Weizhu (Chinese: 张维柱; born 1967) is a Chinese Catholic prelate who has served as Bishop of Xinxiang since 1992.

== Biography ==
Zhang was ordained a priest in 1985, and then ordained a bishop in 1991, and was imprisoned several times. In February 1998, he was appointed Bishop of the Roman Catholic Diocese of Xinxiang, with its 100,000 faithful, by the Pope.

On May 21, 2021, Bishop Zhang Weizhu was arrested; the day before, seven priests and ten seminarians had been arrested.

On May 20, 2021 in the early afternoon, about 100 policemen from Hebei province - from Cangzhou, Hejian and Shaheqiao - surrounded the building that is used as a diocesan seminary in Shaheqiao, Hebei. Indeed, Xinxiang used as a seminary a small factory owned by a Hebei Catholic. The police entered the building and detained four priests, seminary professors, and three other priests who carry out pastoral work. Together with them they arrested 10 seminarians who were attending class at the factory.

Following the directives of the New Regulation on religious activities, the factory was closed and the director of the company was arrested.

Xinxiang Apostolic Prefecture is not recognized by the Chinese government. For this reason, all the activities of priests, seminarians and faithful are considered "illegal" and "criminal."

After the raid, the police seized all the personal effects of the priests and seminarians.

Given the huge deployment of police forces, the raid is believed to have been planned for a long time. The civil authorities believe that there are more seminarians who managed to escape and are looking for them in the area.

Public safety and police go house to house to find them. If they discover that there are signs related to the Catholic faith (crosses, statues, sacred images, photographs of the Pope, etc.), they kidnap and destroy the objects and fine the owners.

According to many observers, since the interim agreement between China and the Holy See was signed, the persecution against Catholics, especially the unofficial ones, has increased. The Agreement only refers to the appointment of new bishops, but the premise of it was that the rest of the Church's situation would remain on hold until the problems could be addressed through dialogue between the two parties. On the contrary, the police forces have placed bishops under house arrest, imposed very high fines on the faithful, expelled parish priests from churches and arrested priests and seminarians. Many faithful consider that "the Agreement has been betrayed".
