= Cupimus imprimis =

Cupimus imprimis Apostolic letter of Pope Pius XII
- Signature date: January 18, 1952
- Text: In Latin

Cupimus imprimis (January 18, 1952) is an apostolic letter of Pope Pius XII to all the faithful in China regarding their persecutions and the persecution of the Catholic Church.

Cupimus Imprimis expresses the great admiration and love of the Chinese people. Religion was established in this country in full recognition of the local customs and greatness of the Chinese culture and society. Therefore, the Pope is saddened to learn that the Catholic Church is accused as an enemy of the people. Church teaching fits all societies, which respect justice, freedom and brotherly love. The Pope expresses his admiration for the courage of the Chinese Christians, who are admired throughout the world. At stake is God, may he listen to all the prayers, and in his goodness provide consolation, giving China and the Church peace and tranquillity again. May he convince those who attack her today, that the Church has no earthly but heavenly goals.

Referring to recent Chinese conquests, Pope Pius continues, there are people whose main aim is to conquer power and expand it every day. The Church on the other hand is teaching every day the truth of Jesus Christ, which converts the hearts towards brotherly love and social engagement for the poor and needy in society. The Church does not obey any earthly power, she does not prefer one society or race over others but loves all equally. The missionaries which came from foreign lands into China, are not agents of foreign powers but messengers for the time being. Pope Pius continues to enumerate the measures taken by him and the Holy See to create Chinese hierarchies and points to the first Cardinal from China.

All fair minded people realize, that the female religious, working every day in the numerous kindergartens, schools, hospitals and orphanages are not agents but follow the calling of God. The Church engages in all these social activities, faithful to the teachings of its founder. All she needs is freedom. False accusations should be taken with a grain of salt and courage. Christ himself proclaimed that the gates of hell will never defeat his Church. "I am with you all days to the end of the world".

For centuries, the Church had to undergo terrible persecutions in China. Chinese earth is red with the blood of Christian martyrs. Everything human, joy, pain, suffering, helplessness and power will fade away. The Church will continue through all earthly trials to the end of time. She will always be under attack, but never be defeated. Therefore, the Chinese faithful should be brave and confident. Peace and freedom will come too to the people of China. May the great Chinese saints and martyrs and the most blessed Virgin Mary, the Queen of China, provide for strength, courage and assistance. The Pope concludes with warm greetings and the Apostolic Blessing.

== See also ==
- Ad Sinarum gentem
