= Ad Sinarum gentem =

1954 papal encyclical by Pope Pius XII

Ad Sinarum gentem Latin for 'To the people of China' Encyclical of Pope Pius XII
- Signature date: 7 October 1954
- Number: 29 of 41 of the pontificate
- Text: In Latin; In English

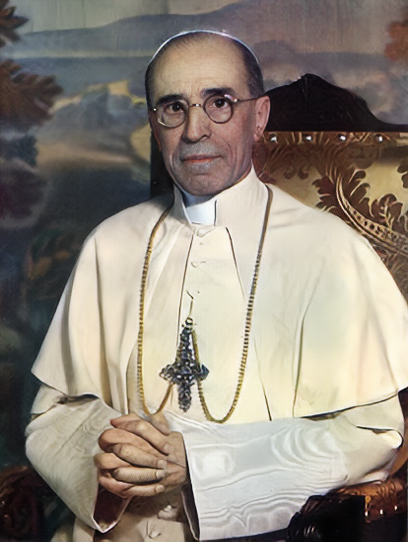
Pope Pius XII, 1951

Ad Sinarum gentem, issued on October 7, 1954, is an encyclical of Pope Pius XII to the Chinese people on the super-nationality of the Church.

== Background ==
The encyclical is written against the background of continued persecution of Christians in the People's Republic of China, the expulsion of foreign missionaries, the jailing of domestic priests and lay people, and the attempts by the State to institute a national Chinese Catholic Church. Three years earlier, the Pope had issued the apostolic letter Cupimus Imprimis to the Chinese people, to express his "sympathy in your afflictions, but also to exhort you paternally to fulfil all the duties of the Christian religion with that resolute fidelity that sometimes demands heroic strength". "Since that time, the conditions of the Catholic Church have not improved. Accusations and calumnies against the Apostolic See, and those who keep themselves faithful to it, have increased. The Apostolic Nuncio has been expelled. Although the "great majority of Catholics have remained steadfast in the Faith, some adhered to dangerous movements from the enemies of all religion".

The consciousness of Our duty demands that We once more direct Our words to you through this Encyclical Letter, with the hope that it can become known to you. May it be of some comfort and encouragement for those who persevere staunchly and bravely in truth and virtue. To the others may it bring light and Our paternal admonitions.

== Message ==
The Pope warns against separation from Rome, defends the Church against accusations of undermining Chinese culture and society, and welcomes cultural differences in preaching and teaching.

The manner of preaching and teaching ought to differ according to place, and therefore ought to conform, when possible, to the nature and particular character of the Chinese people, and also to its ancient traditional customs. If this is properly done, certainly greater fruits will be gathered among you. But—and it is absurd merely to think of it—by what right can men arbitrarily and diversely in different nations, interpret the Gospel of Jesus Christ?

This pastoral flexibility cannot imply however, that the Church agrees to political theology or a specific Chinese Christianity.
