= Ye Shuhua =

Chinese astronomer (born 1927)

- 叶叔华

Member of the 8th and 9th Standing Committee of the National People's Congress
- In office 1998–2008
- Chairman: Wu Bangguo

Member of the 5th National Committee of the Chinese People's Political Consultative Conference
- In office 1978–1983
- Chairman: Deng Xiaoping

Personal details
- Born: 21 June 1927 (age 99) Guangzhou, Guangdong, Republic of China
- Party: Chinese Communist Party
- Spouse: Cheng Jitai
- Education: Sun Yat-sen University
- Scientific career
- Fields: Astronomy
- Workplaces: Shanghai Astronomical Observatory
- Academic advisors: Zou Yixin

Chinese name
- Simplified Chinese: 叶叔华
- Traditional Chinese: 葉叔華
Transcriptions
Standard Mandarin
- Hanyu Pinyin: Yè Shūhuá

Ye Shuhua (Chinese: 叶叔华; born June 21, 1927) is a Chinese astronomer and professor at Shanghai Astronomical Observatory, known for achieving one of the world's most precise measurements of Universal Time in the 1960s, and for establishing the very-long-baseline interferometry (VLBI) and satellite laser ranging (SLR) techniques in China.

Ye served as President of Shanghai Astronomical Observatory, Vice-President of the Chinese Astronomical Society, and Vice-President of the International Astronomical Union. She is a member of the Chinese Academy of Sciences and a foreign fellow of the Royal Astronomical Society of Britain. The asteroid 3241 Yeshuhua is named after her.

== Early life ==
Ye Shuhua was born June 21, 1927, in Guangzhou, Guangdong, China. She spent most of her school years during the Second Sino-Japanese War (1937–45), and had to move repeatedly with her family from Guangzhou to Hong Kong, Shaoguan, and Lian County, because of the war.

After the surrender of Japan in 1945, Sun Yat-sen University in Guangzhou resumed its admissions. Ye hoped to study literature at the university, but her father wanted her to study medicine for better career prospects. She was not interested in medicine, and as a compromise with her father, she agreed to study mathematics instead. At the time, mathematics and astronomy were under the same department at Sun Yat-sen University, and under the influence of Professor Zou Yixin, she later chose to major in astronomy.

== Career ==
In 1951, Ye Shuhua moved to Shanghai with her husband Cheng Jitai (程极泰), who taught at the mathematics department of Fudan University. Ye found work at the French-built Zikawei (Xujiahui) Observatory, which later became part of Shanghai Astronomical Observatory. In 1958, she became the leader of a team of scientists working to improve the precision of China's measurement of Universal Time, which ranked the last in the world. By 1963, China's Universal Time measurement leapt to the world's second most precise. It was set as the basic national standard in 1965, and her team later received many national awards for this achievement.

When the Cultural Revolution started in 1966, Ye Shuhua, like many other intellectuals, was persecuted and held in a "cowshed" (牛棚). She also had to work as a house painter.

After the end of the Cultural Revolution in 1976, Ye was appointed research professor of Shanghai Astronomical Observatory, and served as its director between 1981 and 1993. Under her leadership, Shanghai Observatory established a very-long-baseline interferometry (VLBI) and a satellite laser ranging (SLR) research station, and participated in the International Earth Rotation Service (IERS) as one of the most technologically advanced bases. In 1991, she was appointed the chief scientist in a Key Basic Research Project to study China's crustal motion. The project verified that the Indian Plate is causing an eastward movement of China's land mass.

Ye Shuhua served as Vice-President of the Chinese Astronomical Society from 1978 to 1988, after which she became its honorary president. She served as Vice-President of the International Astronomical Union from 1988 to 1994. She was elected a member of the Chinese Academy of Sciences in 1980, and a foreign fellow of the Royal Astronomical Society of Britain in 1985.

== Honours and awards ==
The Purple Mountain Observatory named the asteroid 3241 Yeshuhua after her. She has been awarded the Ho Leung Ho Lee Prize for astronomy.

== Selected publications ==
- Optical observations of time and latitude and the determining of the earth rotation parameters. Proceedings of IAU Colloquium No. 63. Dordrecht: D.Reidel Publishing Company: pp. 11–23. (1982)
- VLBI measurements of radio positions at three stations. Proceedings of IAU Colloquium No. 63. Dordrecht: D.Reidel Publishing Company: pp. 329–336. (1982)
- Note on the terrestrial reference system for geodynamics. Proceedings of the 5th IAG Symposium. Washington: National Oceanic and Atmospheric Administration: p. 46. (1982)
- Intercomparison of celestial reference frame-general principle. Reference Frames in Astronomy and Geophysics. Kluwer Acad Publ: pp. 295–304. (1989)
- with Wan T.S., Qian Z.H. Progress on Chinese VLBI Network Project. Radio Interferometry. Proceedings of IAU Colloquium No. 131, Provo, Utah: Astronomical Society of the Pacific: pp. 386–389. (1991)

== See also ==
- Timeline of women in science

== Bibliography ==
- Lee, Lily Xiao Hong; Stefanowska, A. D.; Wiles, Sue (2003). Biographical Dictionary of Chinese Women. M.E. Sharpe. ISBN 978-0-7656-0798-0.
