= Sheshan Basilica =

Church building in Shanghai, China

The Basilica of Holy Mary the Help of Christians National Shrine of Our Mother in Sheshan
- 佘山進敎之佑聖母大殿
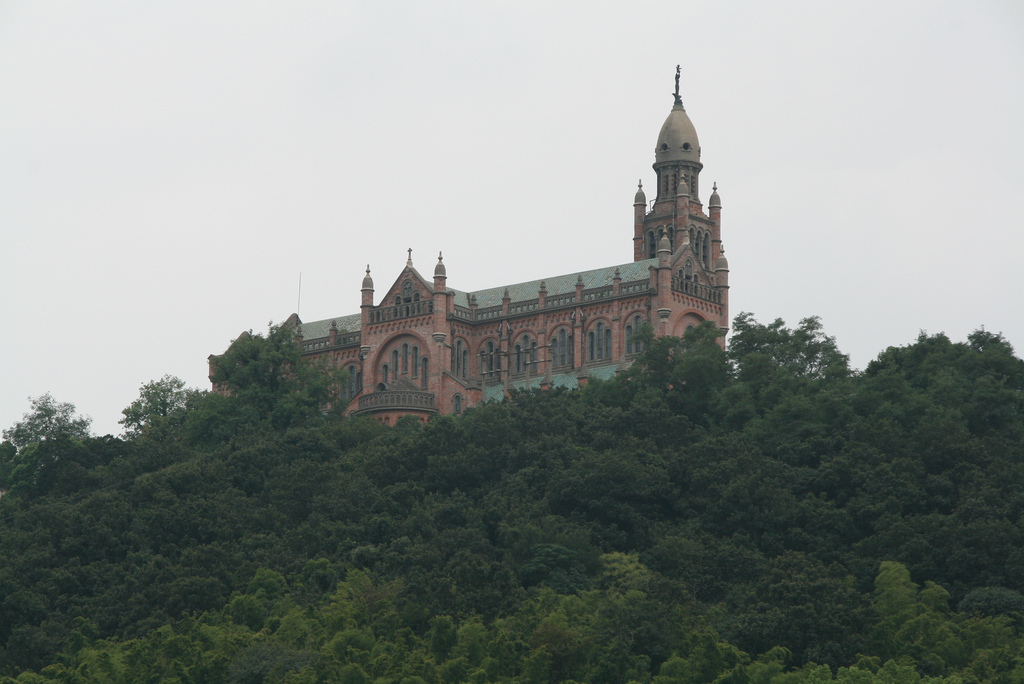
- Exterior view of the Sheshan Basilica

Religion
- Affiliation: Roman Catholic
- Diocese: Diocese of Shanghai
- Rite: Roman rite
- Ecclesiastical or organizational status: Minor basilica

Location
- Location: Sheshan Hill, Songjiang District, Shanghai
- Interactive map of The Basilica of Holy Mary the Help of Christians; National Shrine of Our Mother in Sheshan
- Coordinates: 31°05′47″N 121°11′16″E

Architecture
- Type: Church
- Style: Romanesque
- Groundbreaking: 1863

The Basilica of Holy Mary, the Help of Christians (Latin: Basilicæ de Nostra Domina Mariæ Auxiliatricis Christianorum) also known as the National Shrine of Our Mother of Sheshan (Chinese: 佘山進敎之佑聖母大殿; pinyin: Shéshān jìnjiào zhī yòu shèngmǔ dàdiàn) is a Roman Catholic Marian shrine in Shanghai, China. Its name comes from the locality of Sheshan Hill in Songjiang District, to the west of Shanghai's metropolitan area.

Pope Pius XII raised the Marian shrine to the status of Minor Basilica via his Pontifical decree Compertum Habemus on 12 September 1942. The shrine was previously romanized as Zosé Basilica (pronounced "Zoh-seh"), using the Shanghainese pronunciation of "佘山" (Sheshan). A venerated statue of the Blessed Virgin Mary under the title of Mary Help of Christians is enshrined within as the patroness of the basilica, along with the recently reconstructed icon of Our Mother of Sheshan, both venerated by Chinese Catholics.

== History ==
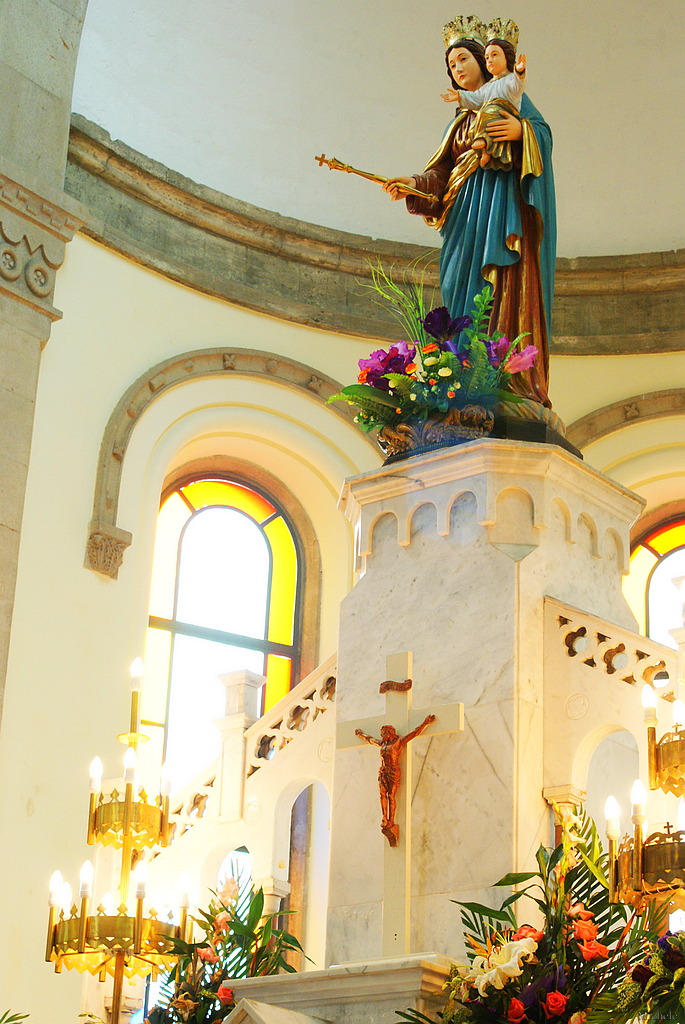
The venerated image of the Blessed Virgin Mary titled as “Mary, the Help of Christians” inside the high altar of the basilica.

Historically, Sheshan had many temples.

French Jesuits began buying land in the area in the early 1860s. They built a sanitarium, a small church next to it, and later a pavilion with a statue of Mary.

During the Taiping Rebellion, Catholics in the area pledged to construct a church dedicated to Mary if they were spared from the chaos. Jesuits began building a hilltop church in 1864 and dedicated it in the early 1870s.

French Jesuit brother Léon Mariot (馬历耀 Ma Liyao, 1830–1902) designed the church. Wood was shipped in from Shanghai, and stone bought from Fujian. All material had to be ported to the peak by hand. The church was completed two years later. This first church was in the form of a cross, and incorporated features of both Chinese and Western architecture. A veranda was placed outside the door, with ten columns. Eight stone lions were placed before the church. In 1894, several ancillary buildings were added. These included the mid-level church, a shrine to the Sacred Heart, the Virgin Mary, and St. Joseph. Fourteen Stations of the Cross were constructed along the path to the church. In 1899–1901, the French Jesuits built an astronomical observatory on the top of the hill, which included a telescope bought by father Stanislas Chevalier (蔡尚質 Cai Shangzhi, 1852–1930) in France.

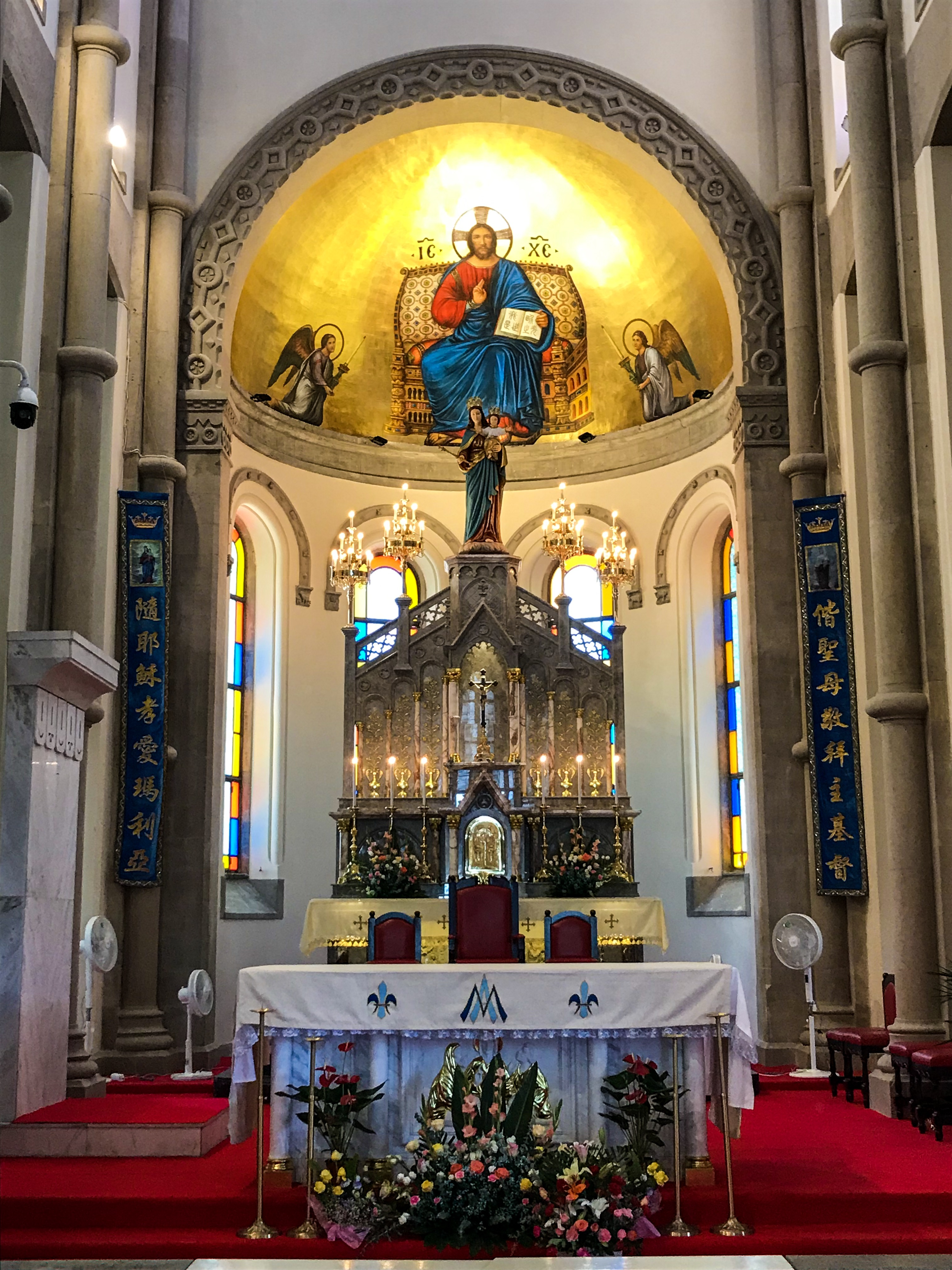
The high altar

In 1920, the existing church was found to be inadequate, and it lagged far behind other churches in Shanghai in terms of size and ornamentation. The Shanghai Jesuits asked the Belgian missionary-architect father Alphonse De Moerloose (和羹柏 He Gengbo, 1858–1932) to design the plans for a monumental new basilica. After the demolition of the old church in 1923, the new basilica on top of the hill was slowly built from 1924 to 1935, under the daily supervision of the Portuguese Jesuit missionary-architect father François-Xavier Diniz (葉肇昌 Ye Zhaochang, 1869–1943).

Pope Pius XI issued a decree Quod Te Delegimus on 20 January 1924, which appointed the Apostolic Delegate to China, Cardinal Celso Benigno Luigi Costantini to convoke the first national synod of Chinese bishops. On 14 June 1924, in the context of the Catholic Synod of Shanghai, he and twenty-five members of the synod climbed on Sheshan hill and solemnly consecrated China to the Virgin Mary under this Marian patronal title.

Pope Pius XII formally raised the Sheshan church to the rank of minor basilica via his pontifical decree Compertum Habemus (originally written on 24 July 1942) and was officially signed and notarized on 12 September 1942. The former Archbishop of Nanjing, Cardinal Paul Yu Pin solemnly crowned the Marian image on 8 May 1946.

The foreigner Peter Harmsen ('Shanghai 1937 – Stalingrad on the Yangtse') gives an account of the battle around the basilica during the Chinese retreat from Shanghai.

In 1947, the basilica was the site of a large ceremony declaring Mary as queen of China.

The former Bishop of Shanghai, Cardinal Ignatius Kung Pin-Mei was arrested and imprisoned for over 30 years in the 1950s. Consequently, the Chinese government transferred the control of the basilica to the Catholic Patriotic Association. Accordingly, the Chinese bishops not recognized by the Vatican and condemned by the papal encyclical Ad Apostolorum Principis.

The church and its environs were damaged during the Cultural Revolution. This included: damage to the mid-level parish church and the Stations of the Cross, destruction of statues in the pavilions, smashing of the stained-glass windows and statutes in the basilica, and toppling the statue at the steeple. Staff of the nearby Sheshan Observatory used the site as a gym.

During the 1970s, Catholic worshippers began returning to the site to pray, often under the pretense of picnicking. By October 1979, a trend had developed of Catholics visiting the site to see Shengmu faguang ("light radiating from the Holy Mother"). In late October 1979, researchers concluded that the lights resulted from reflections off the nearby observatory windows and the glazed tiles of the basilica roof and published an article in January 1980 to debunk the occurrence. Publication of the article increased public interest in the phenomenon.

After the end of the Cultural Revolution in 1976, the damage was gradually repaired. The statue was initially replaced with a simple iron cross, and a replacement statue was installed in 2000.

Pope Benedict XVI on 24 May 2008 announced that he had composed a special prayer for Our Lady of Sheshan.

== Layout ==
The church occupies an area of 1 hectare and is about 70 feet (20 m) tall. It is a rectangular Latin cross in shape, and in classical basilica form. Entrances are placed in the north, west, and south. The main door is in the southwest. The nave is 55.81 m long, 24.68 m wide. The ceiling is 16.46 m high, and the church can seat 3000. The altar is placed at the eastern end, and is built of marble with gold trim and in-laid jade. The exterior is mainly granite, and part of the roof is covered in Chinese-style color-glazed tiles.

The bell tower stands on the south-east corner. It is 38 m tall. At the top of its bell tower stands a 4.8m bronze Madonna and Child statue ("Our Lady of Zosé").

== Pilgrimage ==
In 1874, Pope Pius IX declared that pilgrims who went to Sheshan in May (traditionally a Marian month) would receive a plenary indulgence. As a result, pilgrims from all over China began to congregate at Sheshan in May, a practice that continues to this day.

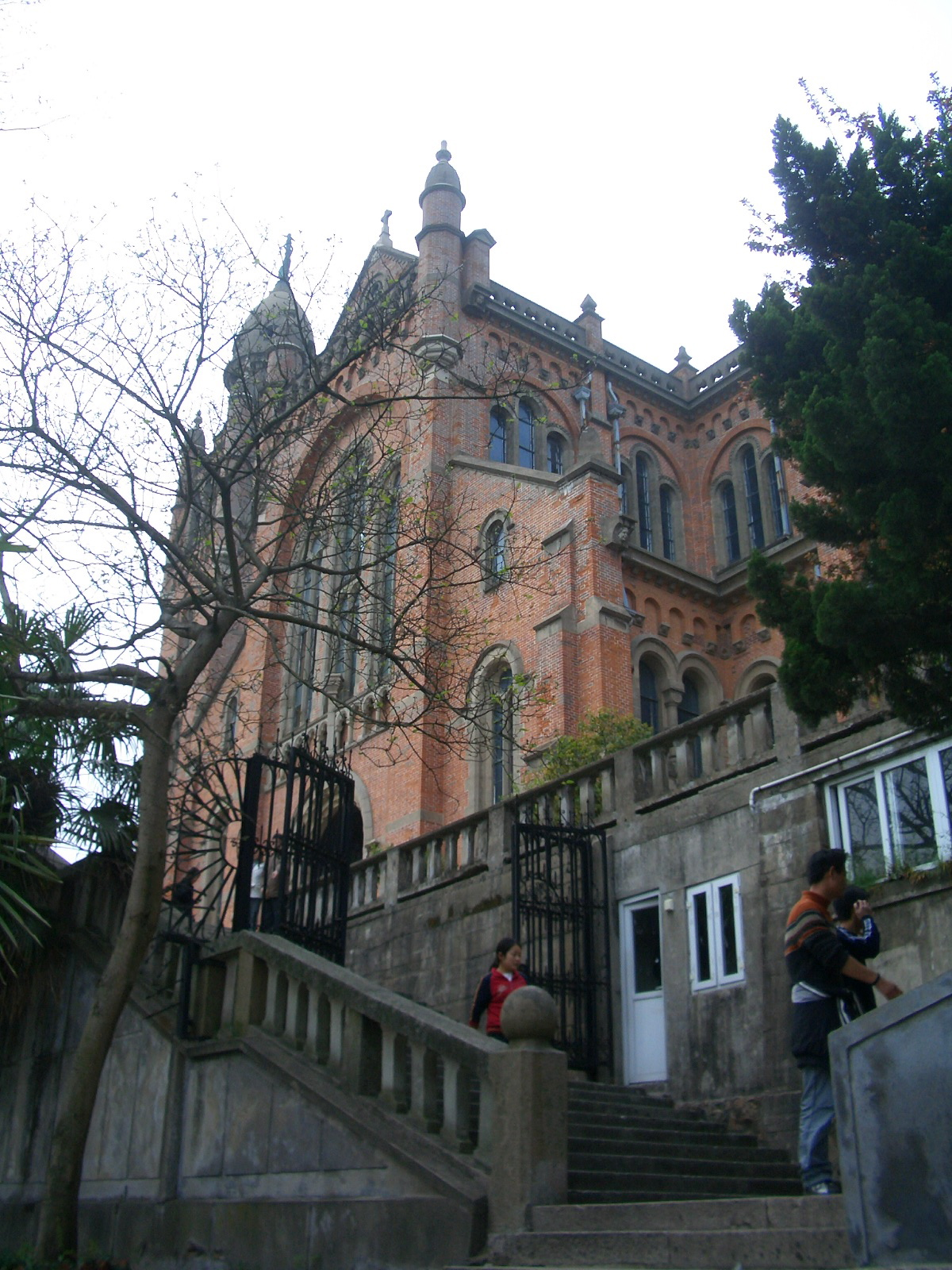
Sheshan Basilica

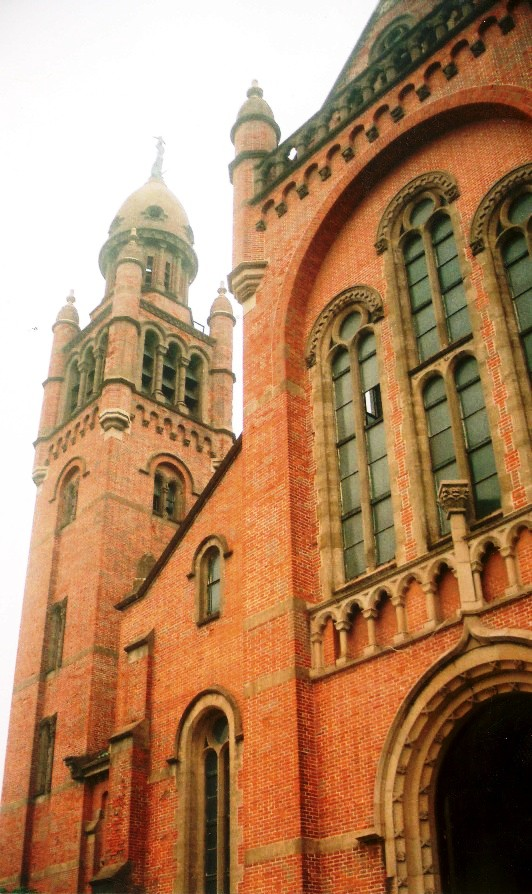
Close-up of the basilica

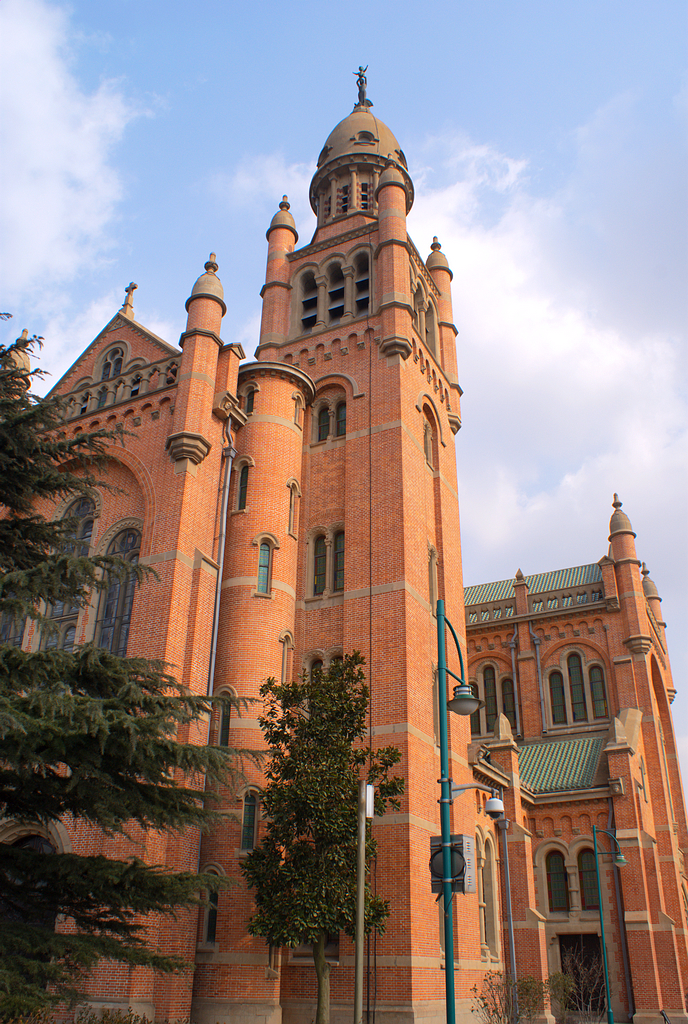
The tower. The statue of Our Lady on the cupola can be seen

== See also ==
- Roman Catholic Marian churches
