= Shanghai Astronomical Observatory =

Shanghai Observatory, Xujiahui Station
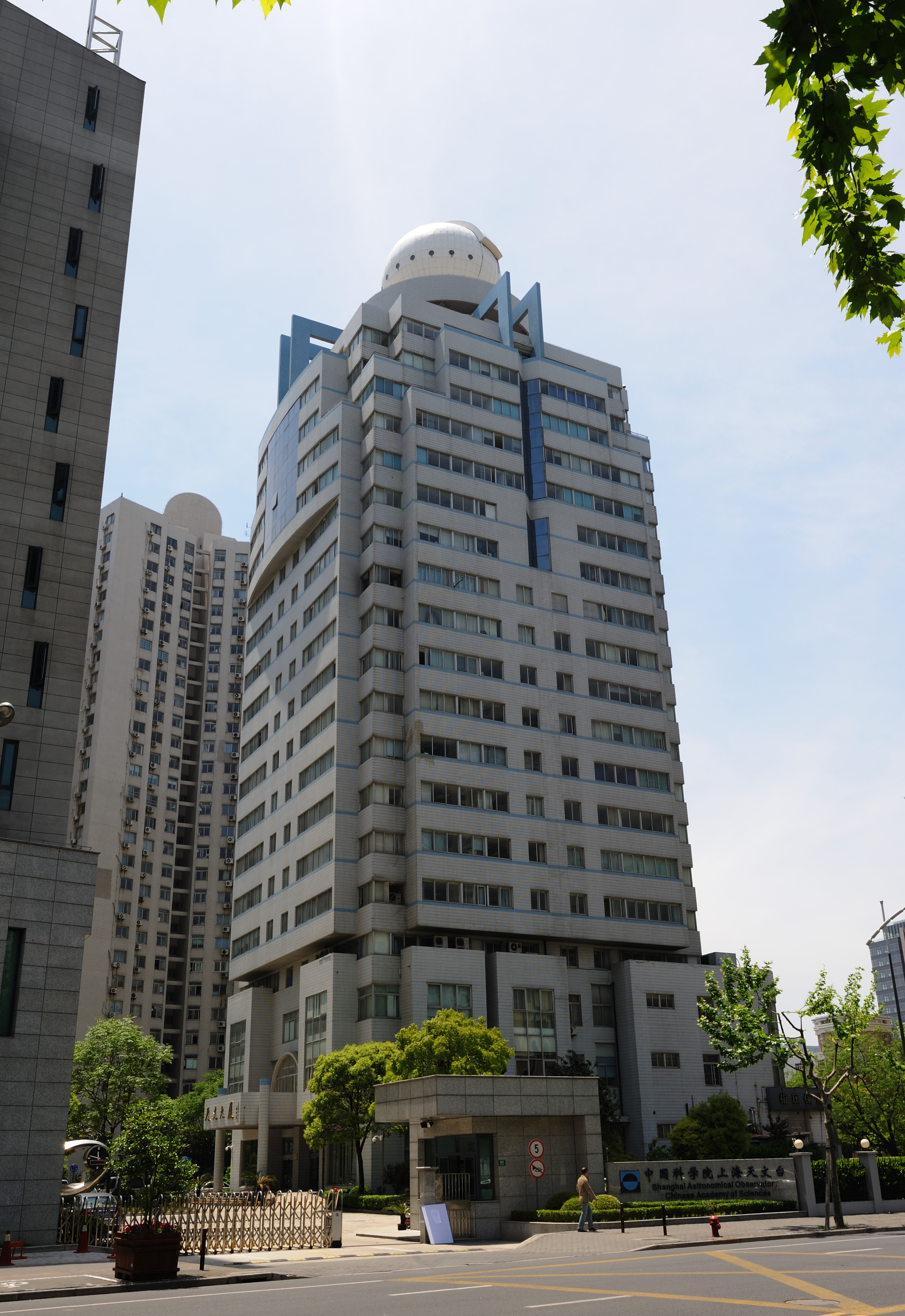
- Organization: Chinese Academy of Sciences
- Location: Xujiahui, Xuhui District, Shanghai
- Coordinates: 31°11′25″N 121°25′46″E
- Website: www.shao.ac.cn
- Telescopes: Sheshan 25m radio telescope
- Location within Shanghai
- Related media on Commons

Shanghai Observatory, Sheshan Station
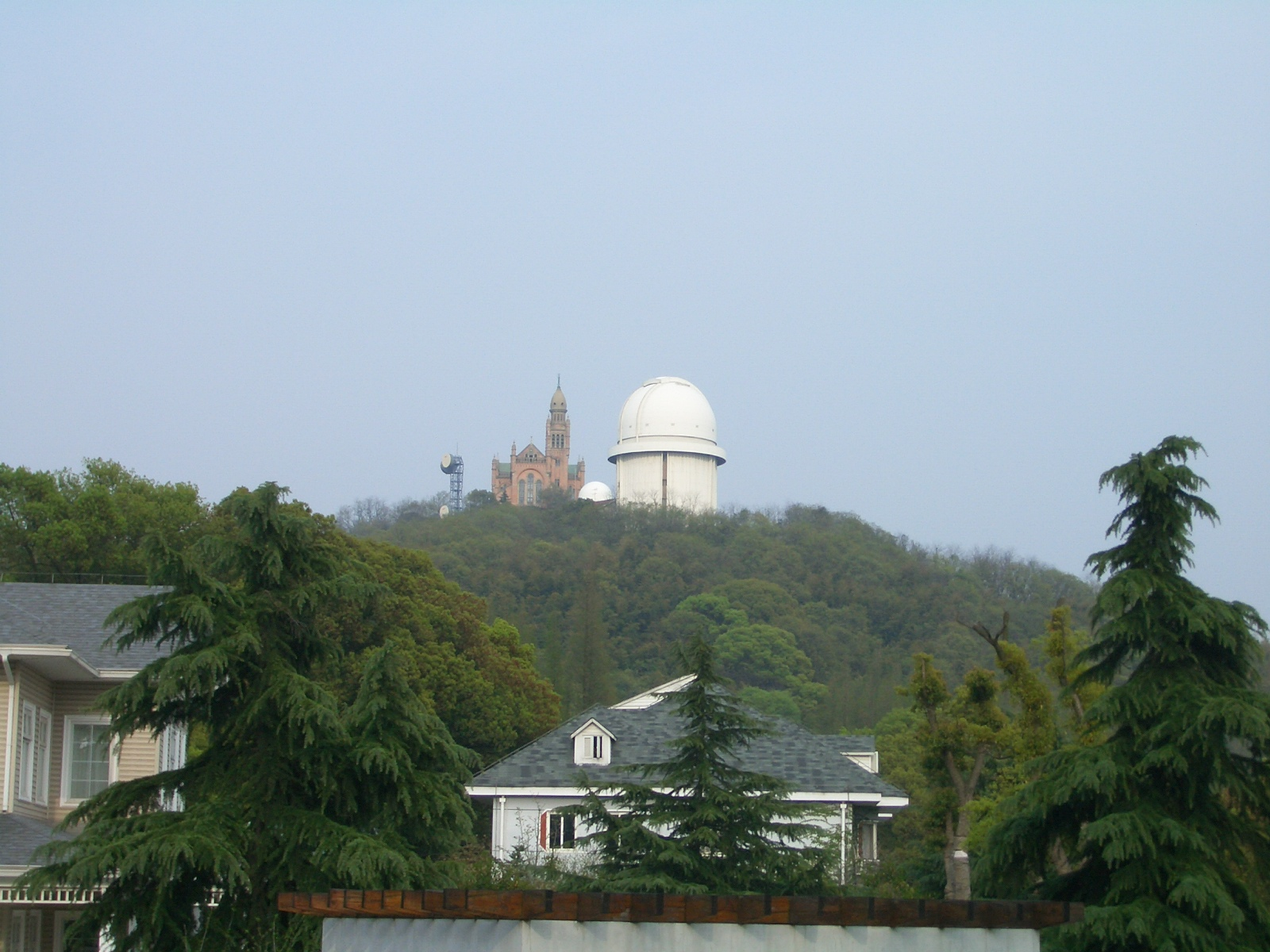
- Organization: Chinese Academy of Sciences
- Observatory code: 337
- Location: Sheshan, Songjiang District, Shanghai
- Coordinates: 31°05′57″N 121°11′58″E
- Altitude: 100 m (330 ft)
- Weather: ~130 clear nights/year

Telescopes
- Tian Ma: 65-m radio telescope
- Sheshan: 25-m radio telescope
- Unnamed: 1.56-m Optical telescope
- Unnamed: 60-cm Laser telescope
- Location within Shanghai
- Related media on Commons

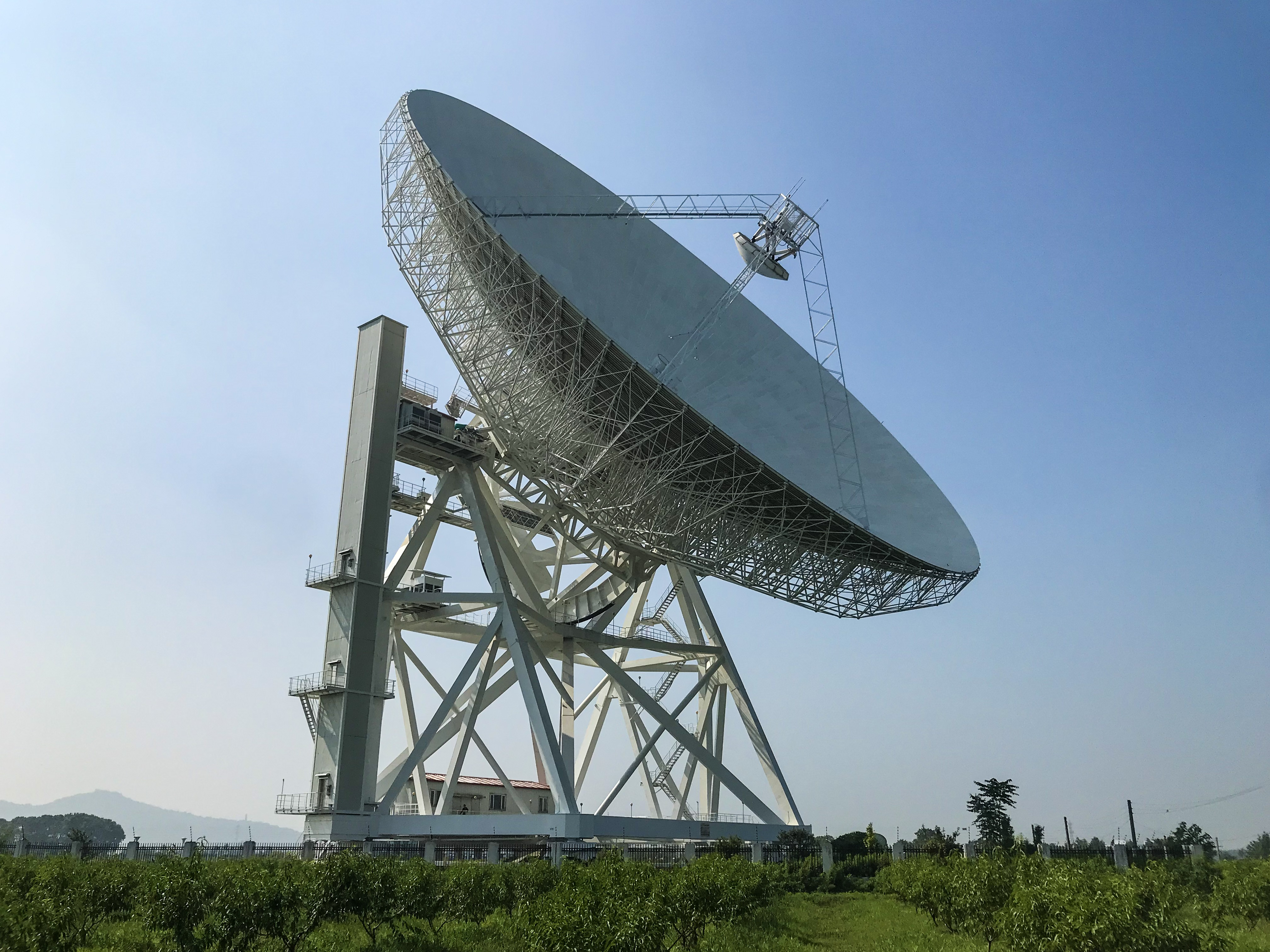
Tianma 65-meter Radio Telescope

Shanghai Astronomical Observatory (SHAO) is an astronomical observatory in Shanghai. It has a long history of astrometry and also operates the 25-meter (82 ft) Sheshan radio telescope as part of the Chinese VLBI array and the European VLBI Network (EVN).

== History ==
It was formed in 1962 from the merger of the Xujiahui (also romanized as "Ziikawei") and Sheshan (Zose) observatories in Shanghai. It was involved with the Chang'e 1 Moon mission as the VLBI array is used for position determinations.

In October 2012 the Tian Ma 65-meter (213 ft) radio telescope was completed for SHAO. It is part of the Chinese Academy of Sciences.

== List of directors ==
- Li Heng (李珩) (1962 − Cultural Revolution)
- Ye Shuhua (1978−1979)
- Li Heng (1979–1981)
- Ye Shuhua (1981−1993)
- Zhao Junliang (赵君亮) (1993−2003)
- Liao Xinhao (廖新浩) (2003−2005, as executive vice director)
- Hong Xiaoyu (洪晓瑜) (2005−2017, as executive vice director until 2007)
- Shen Zhiqiang (沈志强; 2017–2025)

== See also ==
- Sheshan Observatory
- List of astronomical observatories
