= Our Mother of Sheshan =

Title of Mary the mother of Jesus venerated in China

Our Mother of Sheshan 佘山聖母
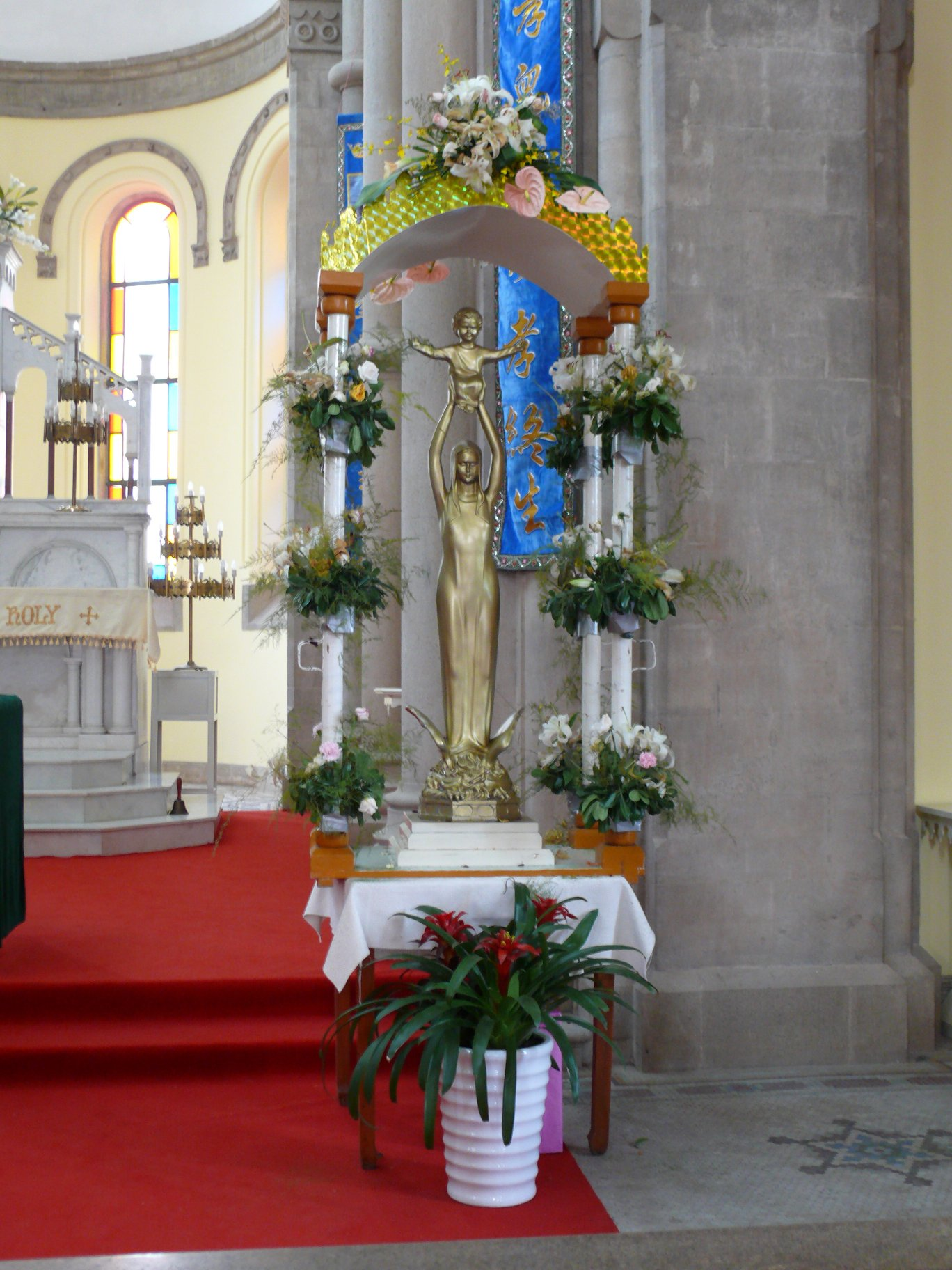

Our Lady of Sheshan, Our Lady of Luck, Our Lady of Good Luck, Mother of China
- Venerated in: Catholic Church in China
- Major shrine: Sheshan Basilica
- Feast: 24 May
- Attributes: Blessed Virgin Mary standing on top a Chinese dragon, Infant Jesus in cruciform gesture
- Patronage: China, Diocese of Shanghai, Chinese Catholics

Our Mother of Sheshan or Our Lady of Sheshan (佘山聖母), also known as Our Mother (or Lady) of Zo-sè (Zo-sè being the original from the Shanghainese pronunciation of Sheshan), is a celebrated Marian title of the Blessed Virgin Mary venerated by Chinese Roman Catholics. Among its religious devotees, the statue is sometimes known as Our Lady of Luck or Our Lady of Good Luck due to the Chinese symbology of "Fu" (福) associated with the styling posture of the entire image. The original image is currently enshrined in the National Shrine and Minor Basilica of Our Lady of Sheshan, in Shanghai, China.

== Background ==
The city of Shanghai, located on the east coast of China, was an important access point to the Yangzi River Valley. As a treaty port it was also home to an international community. Shanghai served as the missionaries’ port of entry to China, a depot to gather supplies needed for the interior missions, a place of relaxation and safety from political strife, and a place to connect with a Chinese Catholic culture that went back to the 1600s.

== History ==
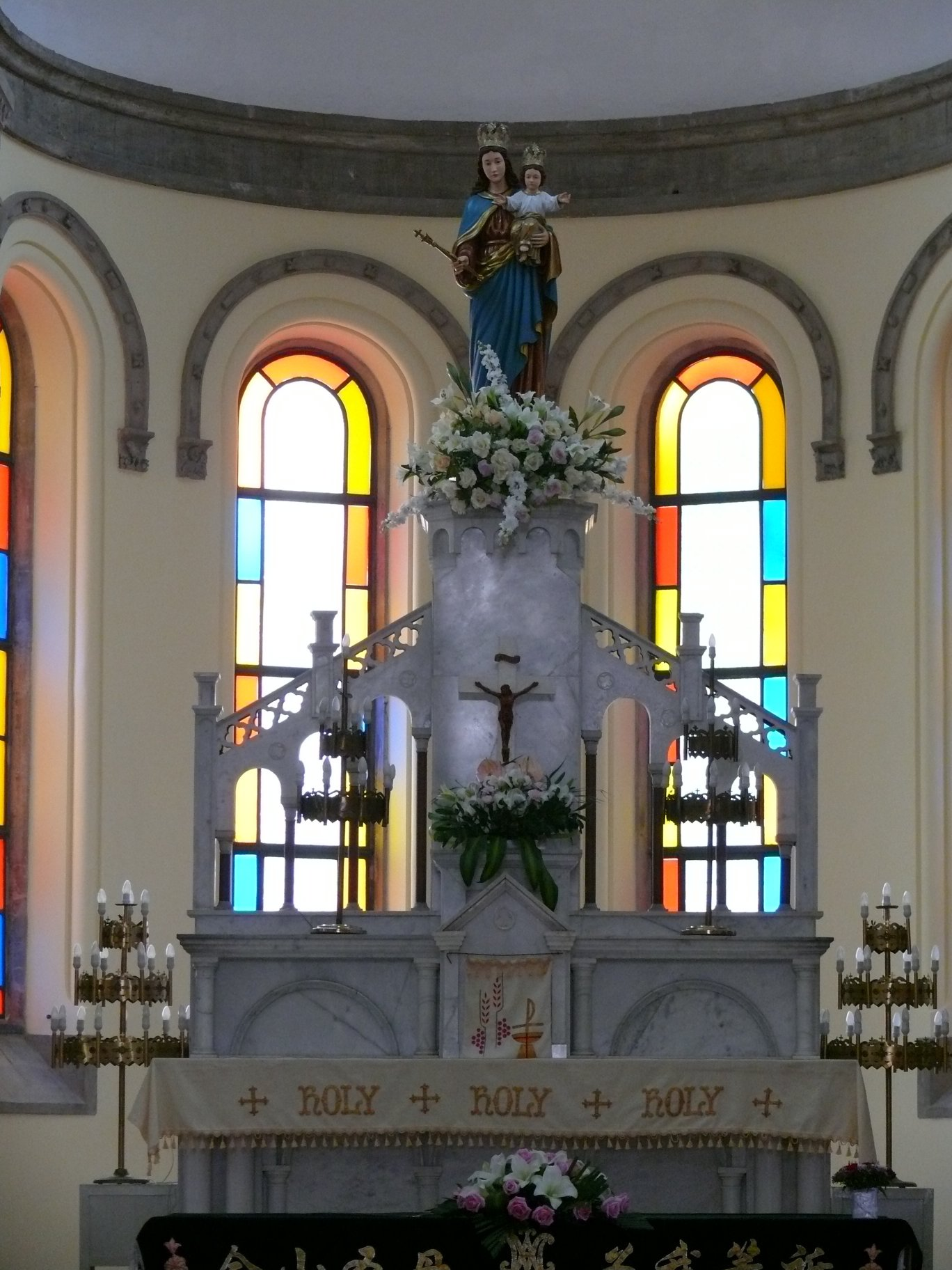
Our Lady, Help of Christians; Sheshan Basilica

The shrine dedicated to Our Lady of Sheshan is located in Songjiang District, western Shanghai, and is dedicated to Our Lady Help of Christians of Sheshan. In 1863, the then Superior of the Jesuit community in Shanghai purchased property on the south side of the mountain of Sheshan, and built a retreat house for retired Jesuit Fathers, with a small chapel next door. On March 1, 1868, the Bishop of Shanghai, Bishop Adrien Languillat, SJ, consecrated the chapel and blessed the image of Our Lady Help of Christians, which was copied from Our Lady of Victory in Paris.

During the attack of the Taiping Rebellion, the Superior of the Jesuit community in Shanghai, Fr. Gu Zhen Sheng, promised the Blessed Virgin that if the diocese was spared from attack, he would build a basilica in thanksgiving for Our Lady's special protection. On April 15, 1873, Bishop Languillat of Shanghai consecrated the Basilica on the hilltop. Since then, Our Lady of Sheshan has become the special protector of the Diocese of Shanghai. In 1874, Pope Pius IX granted an indulgence for all pilgrims who completed a pilgrimage to the Shrine during the month of May.

In May 1981, the People's Government of Shanghai returned the Sheshan Basilica to the Shanghai Catholic Diocese.

== The Statue of Our Lady of Sheshan ==
In 1924, the first conference of bishops met in Shanghai and adopted the image of the reported apparition as Our Lady of China, or Our Lady Queen of China, and a painting depicting the mother of God bearing the child Jesus was commissioned and hung in the local church. The annual procession dates back to that year.

The image is a remake of the previous re-interpreted image of Mary Help of Christians, who is the Marian patroness venerated in the National Shrine-Basilica of Sheshan, the first historical basilica erected in Eastern Asia. During the Cultural Revolution, the original statue was destroyed, with only the dragon base remaining. Additionally, a traditional image of Mary Help of Christians continues to be highly venerated in the Sheshan Basilica, enshrined atop its main high altar.

In April 2000, a new statue was constructed and was blessed by Bishop Aloysius Jin Luxian. The new image features the stand-erect Blessed Virgin Mary carrying a Child Jesus on her head, while his arms outstretched in a cruciform gesture. At the base is the original Chinese dragon, representing the Devil with a trident tail, being crushed and defeated by the Madonna.

In 2008, a copy of the statue was given to Pope Benedict XVI, who then invoked the Marian title through his Prayer to Our Lady of Sheshan. The pontiff requested that the prayer be recited more devoutly on May 24, the feast of Mary Help of Christians to whom the Basilica of Sheshan holds under Marian patronage. The Shanghai Government then banned pilgrimages to the sanctuary from neighboring dioceses.

In May 2012, a wooden replica statue was processed by Chinese American Catholics in New York, United States. The religious image was solemnly approved and blessed by Bishop Guy Sansaricq.

== Veneration ==
Sheshan Basilica of Mary, Help of Christians is one of the most prominent pilgrimage shrines in China.

In May 2007, Pope Benedict XVI released a Letter to Chinese Catholics, in which he asked that May 24 each year be celebrated as a World Day of Prayer for the Church in China. He chose May 24 because it is the Feast of Our Lady Help of Christians, who is venerated at the Shrine of Sheshan in Shanghai. The following year Pope Benedict composed a prayer to Our Lady of Sheshan.

On May 24, 2009, during his Regina Caeli papal address, Pope Benedict XVI designated May 24, the Feast of Mary Help of Christians, as a day of prayer for Chinese Catholics calling them to renew their fidelity to the Pope as the sole successor of Saint Peter.
