= Brezje, Radovljica =

Brezje
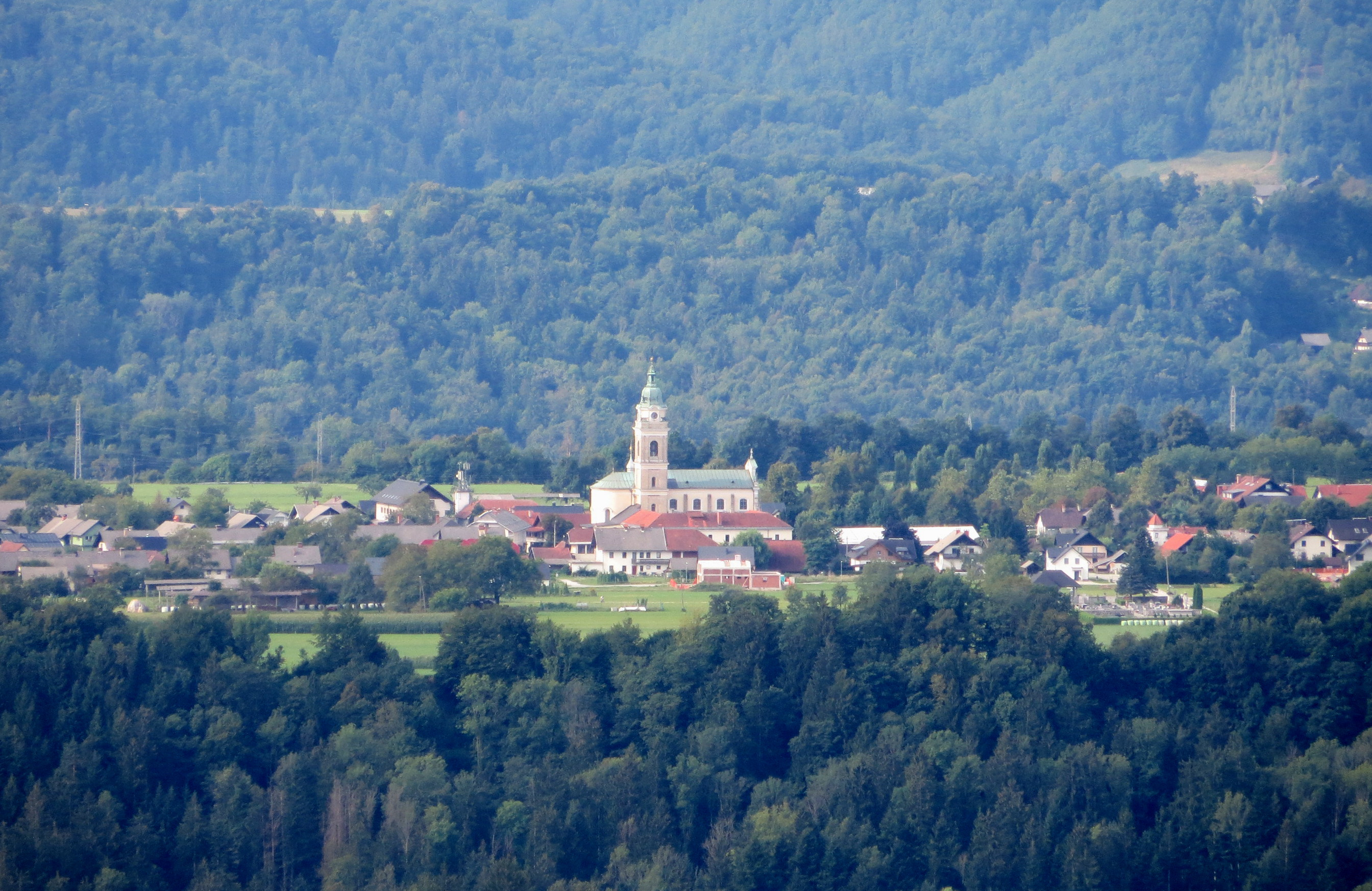

- Location in Slovenia
- Coordinates: 46°19′43″N 14°14′7″E
- Country: Slovenia
- Traditional region: Upper Carniola
- Statistical region: Upper Carniola
- Municipality: Radovljica
- Elevation: 483 m (1,585 ft)

Population (2002)
  - Total: 493

Brezje (pronounced [ˈbɾeːzjɛ]; German: Bresiach) is a settlement in the Municipality of Radovljica in the Upper Carniola region of Slovenia. The village is located southwest of Radovljica on the road to Kranj.

== Name ==
Brezje was attested in written sources as Fresiach in 1350, Vresyach in 1354, Zabrezyach in 1389, and Nabresiach in 1498, among other spellings. The name Brezje literally means 'birch woods', derived from the common noun breza 'birch'. Like similar toponyms in Slovenia (e.g., Brezova, Brezovec, Brezovci), it originally referred to the local vegetation.

== Basilica ==
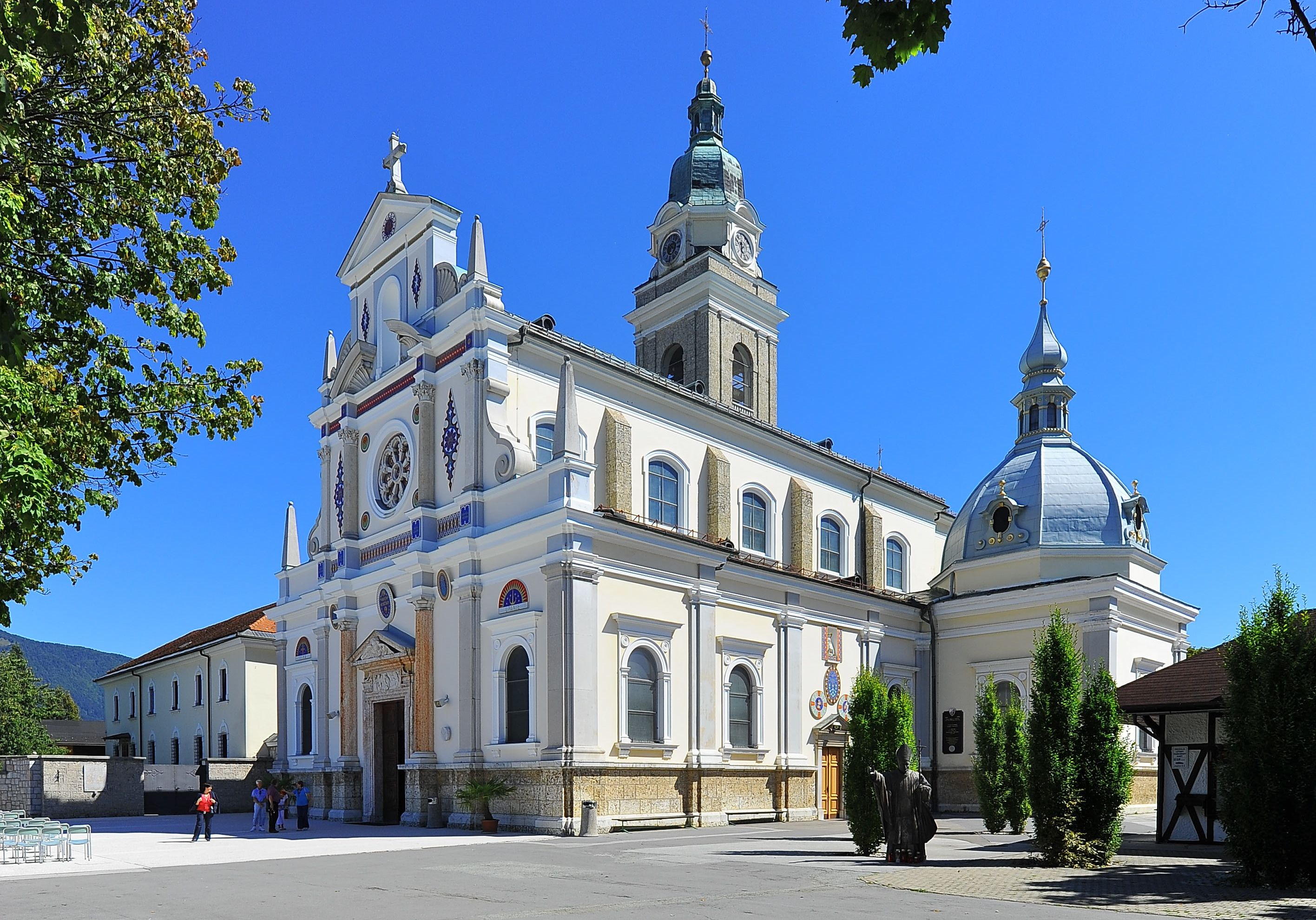
View from west

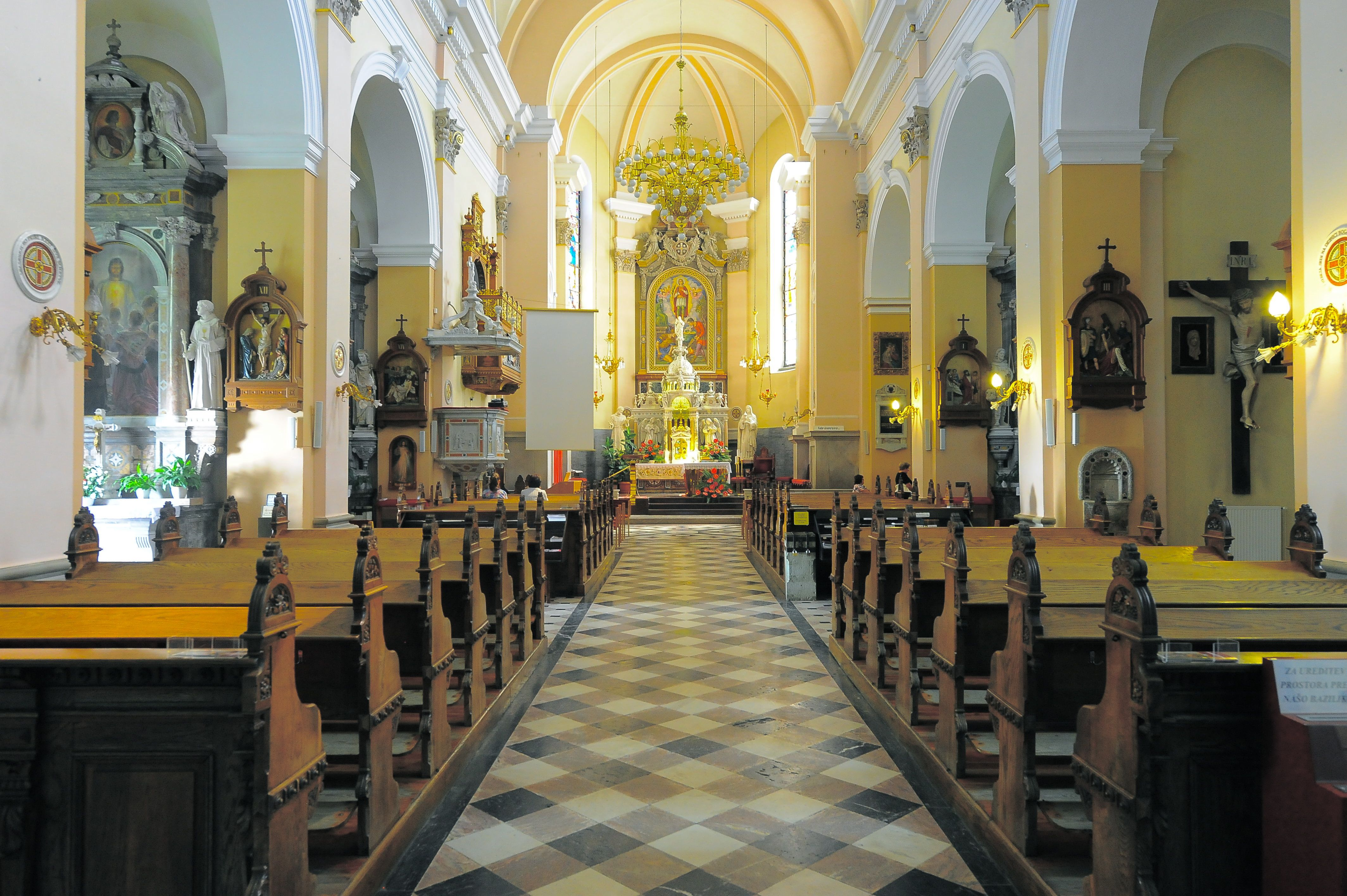
Interior

Mary Help of Christians Basilica

Brezje is best known for Mary Help of Christians Basilica (Slovene: Bazilika Marije Pomagaj), the largest pilgrimage church in Slovenia and national shrine of the Roman Catholic Archdiocese of Ljubljana. The present-day Neo-Renaissance church building modelled on the Basilica of Saint Mary of the Angels in Assisi was consecrated in 1900; it replaced Mary Help of Christians Chapel in the 15th century St Vitus parish church which had become a major pilgrimage site in the 19th century. Mary Help of Christians Basilica is also the monastery church of a Franciscan convent established at the site in 1898. The church plaza was laid out according to plans by Jože Plečnik.

On 5 October 1988 the building was honoured with the title of minor basilica by apostolic grant of Pope John Paul II; he visited Brezje on 17 May 1996. Marije Pomagaj is one of two basilicas in Slovenia, the other is the Stična Abbey church in Lower Carniola. In 2000 the Slovenian Bishops' Conference declared it a national shrine. Every year, about 400,000 people visit the site, with the main pilgrimage celebrated on May 24.
