= Mary, Help of Christians =

Title of the Virgin Mary

Our Lady Help of Christians
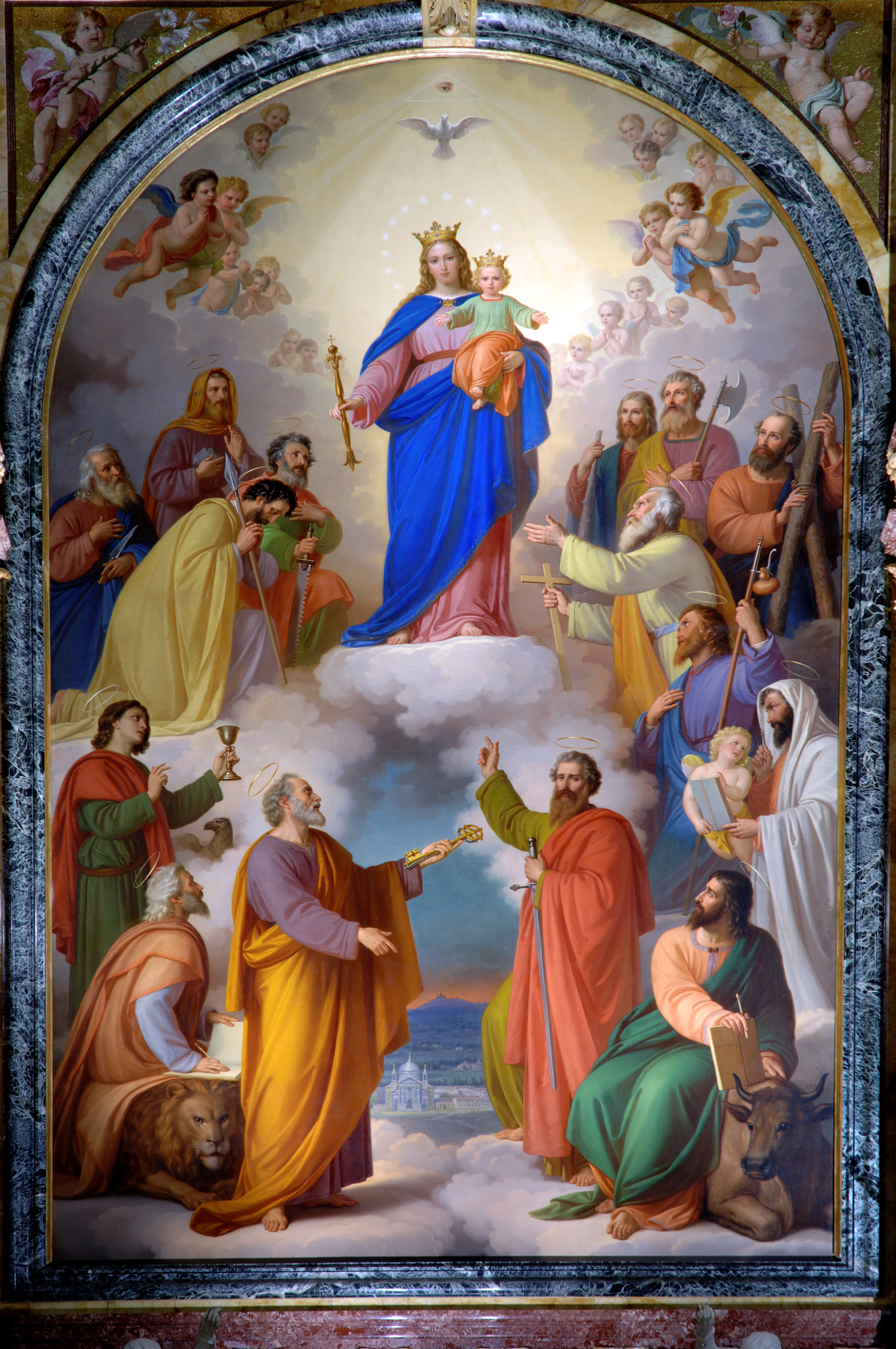
- The venerated image at the Turin Basilica
- Venerated in: Catholic Church; Eastern Orthodox Church (as Boetheia or Gorgoypikoos)
- Feast: 24 May
- Attributes: Mary holding the Child Jesus, both wearing crowns; Mary holding a sceptre
- Patronage: Australia, New Zealand, China, Argentina, Salesians of Don Bosco
- Pontificial Approbations

Canonical Coronations
- Turin, Italy: Pope Leo XIII; 13 February 1903
- Brezje, Slovenia: Pope Pius X 24 June 1907
- San Fabian, PH: Pope Francis; 23 March 2018
- Parañaque City, PH: Pope Francis; 16 November 2021

Historical Milestones
- Feast Instituted: Pope Pius VII 1815
- First Mention: John Chrysostom 345 AD
- Major Promoter: St. John Bosco
- Latin Title: Auxilium Christianorum

Mary Help of Christians (Latin: Sancta Maria Auxilium Christianorum) is a Catholic title of the Blessed Virgin Mary, based on a devotion now associated with a feast day of the General Roman Calendar on 24 May. John Chrysostom was the first to describe this title, in AD 345. In more recent times, Don Bosco and Vincent Pallotti propagated devotion under this title. It is associated with the defense of Christian Europe, North Africa and the Middle East from non-Christians during the Middle Ages.

As the Ottoman Empire intended to invade Christian Europe in 1571, Pope Pius V called on Christian armies for help and their victory was consequently attributed to the intercession of Mary under this devotional title. Pope Leo XIII granted a decree of canonical coronation for a Turin painting of the devotion in 1903. The coronation was executed by Cardinal Agostino Richelmy and the painting is now permanently enshrined at the Basilica of Mary Help of Christians.

== History ==
=== Patristic origins ===
There are two inscriptions from the first centuries of Christianity in Greek related to Mary: θεοτοκος (Teotokos, Theotokos, Mother of God) and βοηθεια (Boetheia, the Helper). The Fathers of the Church referred to Mary as "βοηθεια". John Chrysostom used the title in a homily of 345, Proclus in 476 and Sebas of Caesarea in 532. After the Patristic period (5th century), other persons used it like Romanos the Melodist in 518, the Patriarch of Jerusalem, Sophronius in 560, John of Damascus in 749 and Germanus I of Constantinople in 733.

In the view of Johann G. Roten, the invocation of Mary as Help of Christians is part of the oldest prayer addressed directly to Mary, the Sub tuum praesidium, which was found on a papyrus dating, at the latest, from the end of the 3rd century. Praesidium is translated as "an assistance given in time of war by fresh troops in a strong manner."

=== The Litany of Loreto ===
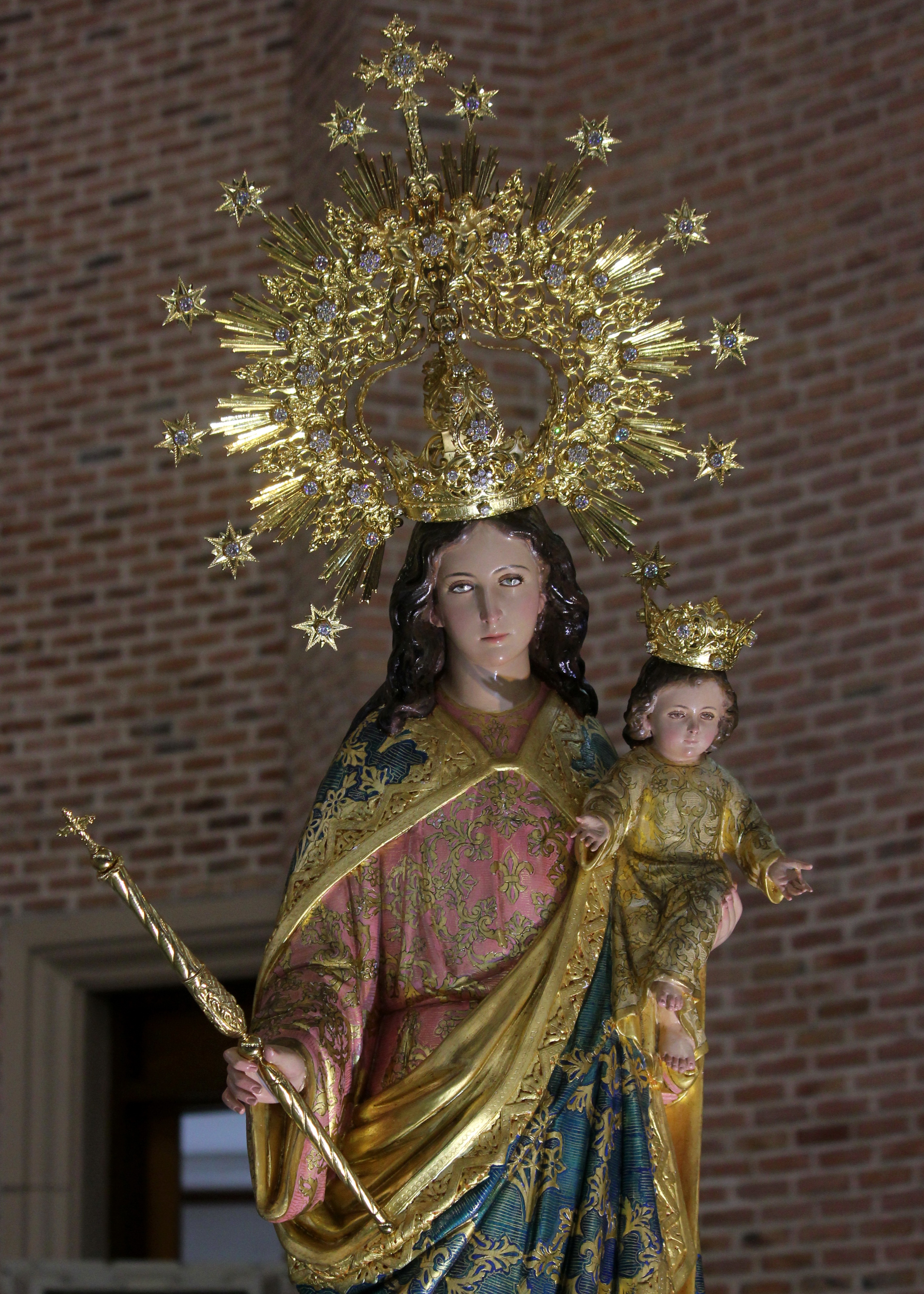
The venerated image in the Mary Help of Christians Seminary in San Fabian, Pangasinan, crowned by Pope Francis for the Philippines on 22 August 2018

In 1576, the Archpriest of Loreto, Bernardino Cirillo published at Macerata two litanies of the Blessed Virgin, which he contended, were used at Loreto. One is in a form entirely different from the present text, while another form, "Aliæ Litaniæ Beatæ Maria Virginis", is identical to the litany approved by Pope Clement VIII in 1601 and now used throughout the Church. This second form contains the invocation Auxilium Christianorum warriors returning from the Battle of Lepanto (7 October 1571) visited the Loreto, and saluted the Holy Virgin there for the first time with this title. It is more probable, however, that it is a variation of the older invocation Advocata Christianorum, found in a litany of 1524.

The first surviving translation of this litany, yet still incomplete, in the Spanish language was recorded in 1621 under the title "La Letania Sagrada de la Bienaventurada Virgen Maria" in Valladolid, Spain. The Italian religious author Orazio Torsellino (1597) and the Roman Breviary (May 24, Appendix) claim that Pope Pius V inserted the invocation in the Litany of Loreto after the Battle of Lepanto. The form of the litany in which it is first found, however, was unknown at Rome at the time of Pope Pius V.

=== Marian Feast ===
The feast of Our Lady, Help of Christians, was instituted by Pope Pius VII. By order of Napoleon I of France, Pope Pius VII was arrested on 5 June 1808, and detained a prisoner first at Grenoble, and then at Fontainebleau. In January 1814, after the battle of Leipzig, he was brought back to Savona and set free on 17 March, on the eve of the feast of Our Lady of Mercy, the Patroness of Savona. The journey to Rome was a veritable triumphal march. The Pope, attributing the victory of the church after so much agony and distress to the Blessed Virgin, visited many of her sanctuaries on the way and crowned her images (e.g., the "Madonna del Monte" at Cesena, "della Misericordia" at Treja, "della Colonne" and "della Tempestà" at Tolentino). The people crowded the streets to catch a glimpse of the Pope who had withstood the threats of Napoleon. He entered Rome on 24 May 1814, and was enthusiastically welcomed. To commemorate his own sufferings and those of the church during his exile Pope Pius VII extended the feast of the Seven Dolours of Mary to the Catholic Church on 18 September 1814.

When Napoleon left Elba and returned to Paris, Murat was about to march through the Papal States from Naples; Pius VII fled to Savona 22 March 1815. After the Congress of Vienna and the battle of Waterloo, the Pope returned to Rome on 7 July 1815. To give thanks to God and Our Lady, on 15 September 1815 he declared 24 May, the anniversary of his first return, to be henceforth the feast of Our Lady, Help of Christians. The 1913 Catholic Encyclopaedia article commented that "it has spread nearly over the entire Latin Church, but is not contained in the universal calendar."

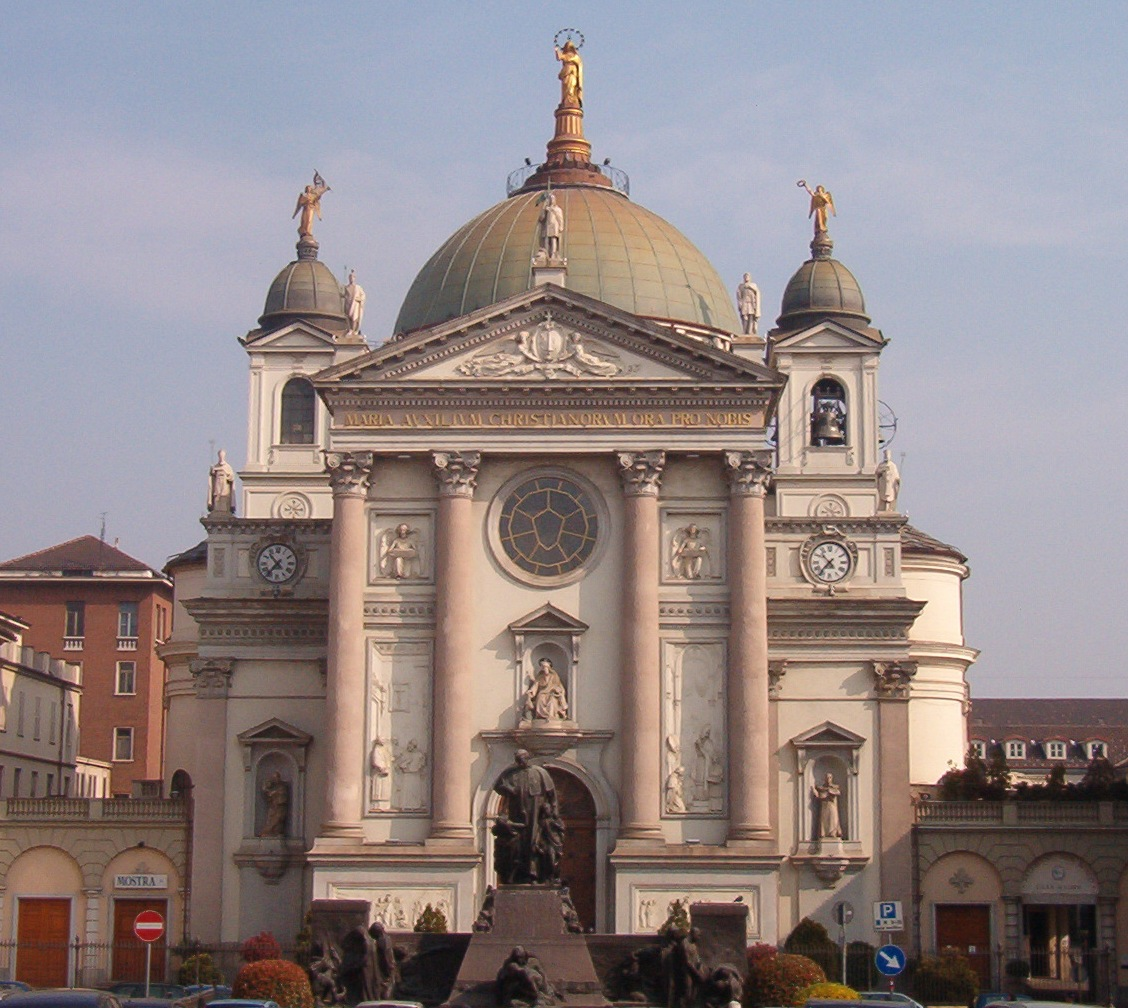
The Basilica of Our Lady Help of Christians, Turin, founded by famed Catholic priest Don Bosco

The Marian feast has been celebrated by the Order of Servites since the 17th century. The veneration to Mary became popular under this title in Rome especially, where the feast was especially promoted by John Bosco and Vincent Pallotti. Bosco was an ardent promoter of devotion to Mary Help of Christians. He built a huge basilica in her honour in 1868 and founded a religious congregation for women under the title of "The Daughters of Mary Help of Christians". Interpreting the painting he had commissioned for the basilica, Bosco referred to it as depicting Mary Mother of the Church. This suggests a connection to the way in which popes have addressed Mary as both Mother and Help of the Church. Bosco chose this devotion because of its affinity to his devotion to the church, the bearer of Christ.

Vatican II, in the Constitution on the Church (sections 61, 62), cites this title of Mary, placing it in the context of Mary's maternal role.

In an utterly singular way she co-operated by her obedience, faith, hope and burning charity in the Saviour's work of restoring supernatural life to souls. For this reason she is a mother to us in the order of grace...By her maternal charity, Mary cares for the brethren of her Son who still wander through this world in the midst of dangers and difficulties until they are led to the happiness of their heavenly home.

=== Observance ===
The church has traditionally focused on two aspects of Our Lady's help on this feast day. Firstly, the church focuses in this feast on the role of Our Lady's intercession in the fight against sin in the life of a believer. Secondly, the church focuses on Our Lady as one who assists Christians as a community, through her intercession, in fighting against anti-Christian forces. Michael Daniel observes that, while this approach may be regarded as outdated, in light of Vatican II, where the world and non-Christians elements therein were seen in a positive rather than a hostile or threatening light, it would seem that it would be naïve on the part of Christians to regard all movements and all social trends as either good or harmless.

The dioceses of Tuscany adopted it on 12 February 1816. The hymns of the Office were composed by Brandimarte. It became the patronal feast of Australasia, a double of the first class with an octave. After the reforms of the Second Vatican Council, it was designated a solemnity to be kept on the first available Sunday on or after 24 May. The Fathers of the Foreign Missions of Paris, in accordance with a vow (1891), celebrated this feast with great splendor in their churches.

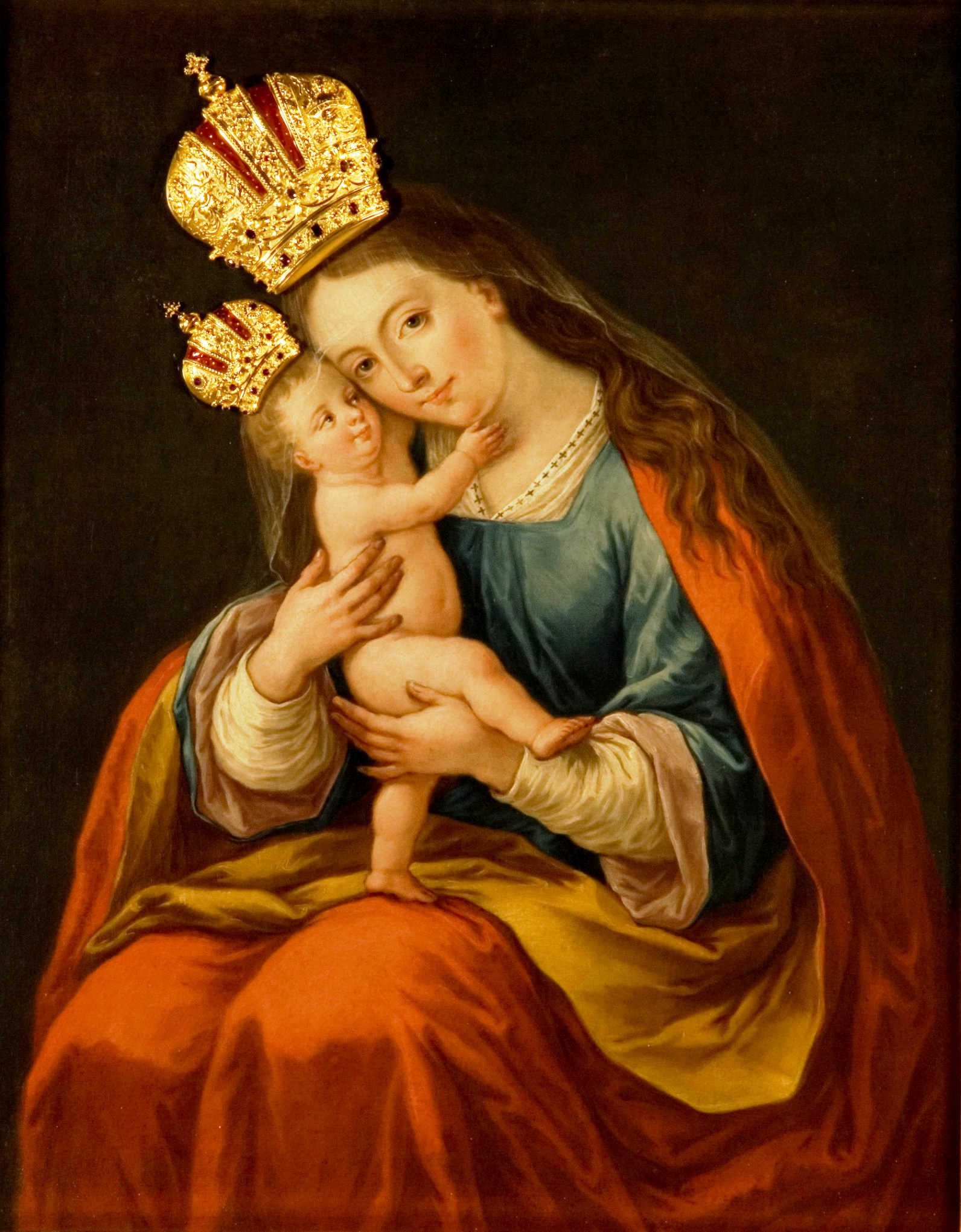
The venerated painting in Brezje, Radovljica crowned by Pope Pius X for Slovenia, which was decreed a Pontifical coronation in June 1907. Pope John Paul II later raised her shrine to the status of Minor Basilica on 5 October 1988.

It has attained special renown since John Bosco, founder of the Salesian Congregation, dedicated his foundation to Our Lady, Help of Christians, the mother church of his congregation at Turin on 9 June 1868. The Salesians have carried the devotion to their numerous establishments. It was established due to the great appreciation of Don Bosco for this Marian title and the development of the Salesian works in many countries since the second half of the 19th century. The Salesian National Shrine of Our Lady Help of Christians in the United States of America is located in Stony Point, New York. There is also the Minor Basilica and National Shrine of Mary Help of Christians Parish in Parañaque City, Philippines, which is also in the care of the Salesians of Don Bosco.

In memory of the liberation of Pope Pius VII from the captivation and imprisonment of Lord Napoleon Bonaparte, which the Pope credited to be by supernatural assistance, the following congregations honored the Blessed Virgin Mary under this title:

- The Diocese of Australia, by institution of an Octave (1888)
- The Order of Barnabites (1908)
- The Society of the Divine Savior (1909)
- The Society of Saint Francis de Sales (1910)
- In the Diocese of La Serena, Chile (1914)
- In the Diocese of Skopje, North Macedonia (1914)

The Church of Notre Dame du Bon Secours in Blosseville, France, was also inaugurated under this Marian title "Help of Christians", dating back to the original church structure in the 13th century. It was finalized in 1840 and Pope Benedict XV ultimately granted a pontifical decree that raised the shrine to the status of minor basilica on 12 February 1919.

The Abbey of Mary Help of Christians, better known as Belmont Abbey, is a small American monastery of Benedictine monks in the town of Belmont, Gaston County, North Carolina, outside of Charlotte, North Carolina. The minor basilica of Our Lady Help of Christians is listed on the National Register of Historic Places. A chapel dedicated to this Marian title exists at the Basilica of the Immaculate Conception in Washington, D.C., US.

Under this title, the Virgin Mary is venerated by the Chinese Catholics, particularly at the Shrine of our Lady of Sheshan, the only minor basilica in mainland China. In May 2007, Pope Benedict XVI designated 24 May her feast for the Catholics in China, who face persecution and restriction from the Chinese Communist Party. Although it is commonly associated with the Catholic Church, the Eastern Orthodox Church has also known the devotion since 1030 in Ukraine, when the country was defended from a barbarian invasion.

=== German title ===
In the Austro-Hungarian Empire and among German-speaking Catholics, there was particular devotion to Maria, Hilfe der Christen, as shown by the Church of Mariahilf and other shrines, including some in the U.S.

== Pontifical approbations ==
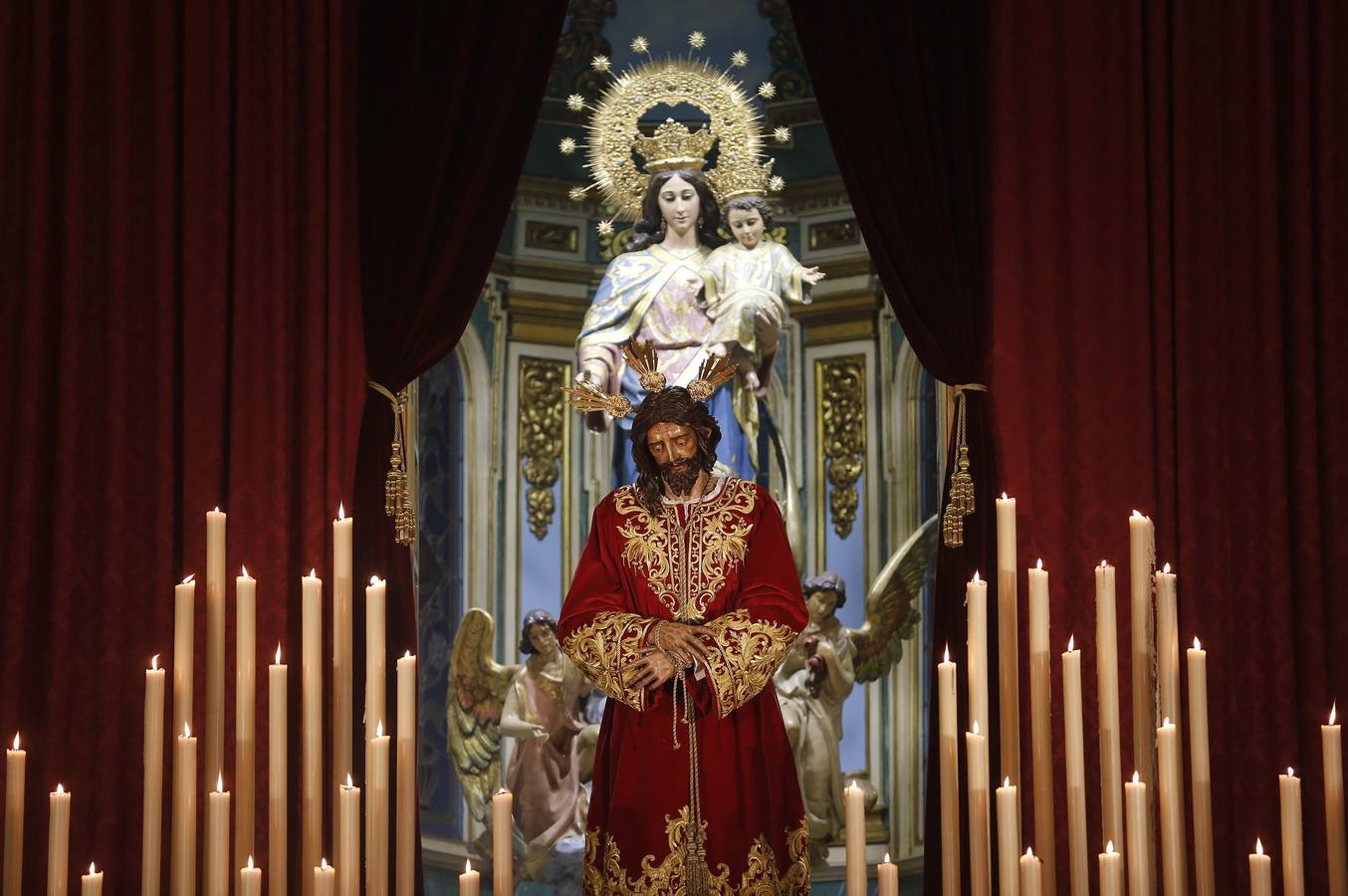
The venerated image in Cordoba crowned by Pope Benedict XVI for Spain, which was decreed a Pontifical coronation on 2 April 2008

- Pope Pius V — exhorted intercessory prayers to Mary under this devotional title in 7 October 1571 during the invasion of the Battle of Lepanto, by which he made an addendum to the Litany of Loreto with this Marian title. Originally a Marian feast instituted under the title of "Our Lady of Victory", it was later changed to the "Feast of the Holy Rosary" by his successor Pope Gregory XIII for the month of "October" in 1573 which survives until this day.
- Pope Pius VII — honored the Virgin Mary under this title upon his release from imprisonment by Lord Napoleon Bonaparte on 24 May 1814, by which he formally instituted the feast of the Virgin Mary under this specific title and survives until present time.
- Pope Pius IX — issued the following decrees:
  - Granted a pontifical decree to the Sacred Congregation of Rites of this Marian title as the official patroness of Australia in 1852. Cardinal Francis Moran expanded this with the institution of an Octave feast for the Diocese of Sydney in 1888.
  - Granted a decree of pontifical coronation to a Marian image of Notre Dame du Bon Secours, Marie Auxiliatrice on 15 July 1870, now enshrined at the Basilique Notre-Dame de Bonsecours in Rouen, France.
- Pope Leo XIII — granted a pontifical decree of canonical coronation to the famed Turin painting on 13 February 1903 through his papal legate, Cardinal Agostino Richelmy, who crowned it on 17 May 1903. The painting is now permanently enshrined within the Basilica of Our Lady Help of Christians in Turin, Italy.
- Pope Pius X — granted a decree of pontifical coronation for the venerated Marian painting at the Basilica in Brezje, Radovljica, Slovenia, on 24 June 1907 and was crowned on 1 September of the same year.
- Pope Benedict XV — redeclared this patronage for Australia with a congratulatory decree titled "In Cœtu Sodalium" granted to the Master General of the Dominican Order Ludwig Maria von Theissling under the honorific title of "Old Virgin / Ancient Virgin" on 29 October 1916.
- Pope Pius XII — issued the following decrees:
  - Formally elevated the Mary Help of Christians shrine in Shanghai, China to the status of Minor Basilica (written on 24 July 1942) and officially signed and notarized on 12 September 1942 via his pontifical decree Compertum Habemus.
  - Granted a Pontifical decree Sacras Inter Ædes on 12 September 1950 raising the shrine of the image to the status of Minor Basilica in Niterói, Brazil, notarized by the Regent of Apostolic Briefs, Monsignor Gildo Brugnola.
- Pope John XXIII — issued a pontifical decree "Auxiliatricem Virginem" granting the Marian title as patroness of Viedma, Argentina signed and notarized by Cardinal Domenico Tardini on 19 April 1960.
- Pope John Paul II — granted the following pontifical decrees:
  - Raised the sanctuary of Mary Help of Christians to the status of Minor Basilica in Brezje, Radovljica, Slovenia, via formal decree titled Satis Quidem Constat on 5 October 1988.
  - Decree of canonical coronation titled In Ecclesia Sanctuario for an image in Twardogóra, Poland, on 5 May 1994 and was crowned on 24 September 1995.
- Pope Benedict XVI — honored Mary under this title via the following pontifical decrees:
  - Granted a decree of pontifical coronation for an image in Cordoba, Spain signed on 2 April 2008, later crowned on 10 May 2009.
  - Raised the sanctuary with the Marian title to the status of Minor Basilica in Seville, Spain signed on 26 October 2008.
  - During his Regina Caeli papal address invoked this Marian patronage, under the venerated title of Our Mother of Sheshan, calling for Chinese Catholics to renew their fidelity to the pope as the sole successor of Peter on 24 May 2009.
- Pope Francis — granted two decrees of canonical coronation of images for the Philippines, and declared the National Shrine of Mary, Help of Christians a minor basilica:
  - The first image is enshrined in the "Catholic Theological Seminary" in San Fabian, Pangasinan on 23 March 2018. The image was crowned on 22 August 2018. This image was a gift to the Bishop Cesar Guerrero by then apostolic delegate, Guglielmo Piani.
  - The second image granted another decree on 16 November 2021 was for the image in Parañaque City. The image was crowned on 24 May 2022 and dates back to 1922 before the Second World War. The image was brought to the Philippines by Archbishop Piani as an episcopal consecration gift from Blessed Philip Rinaldi, SDB. The Shrine was also declared a Minor Basilica on March 27, 2025, less than a month before the death of Pope Francis.

== Artistic representations ==
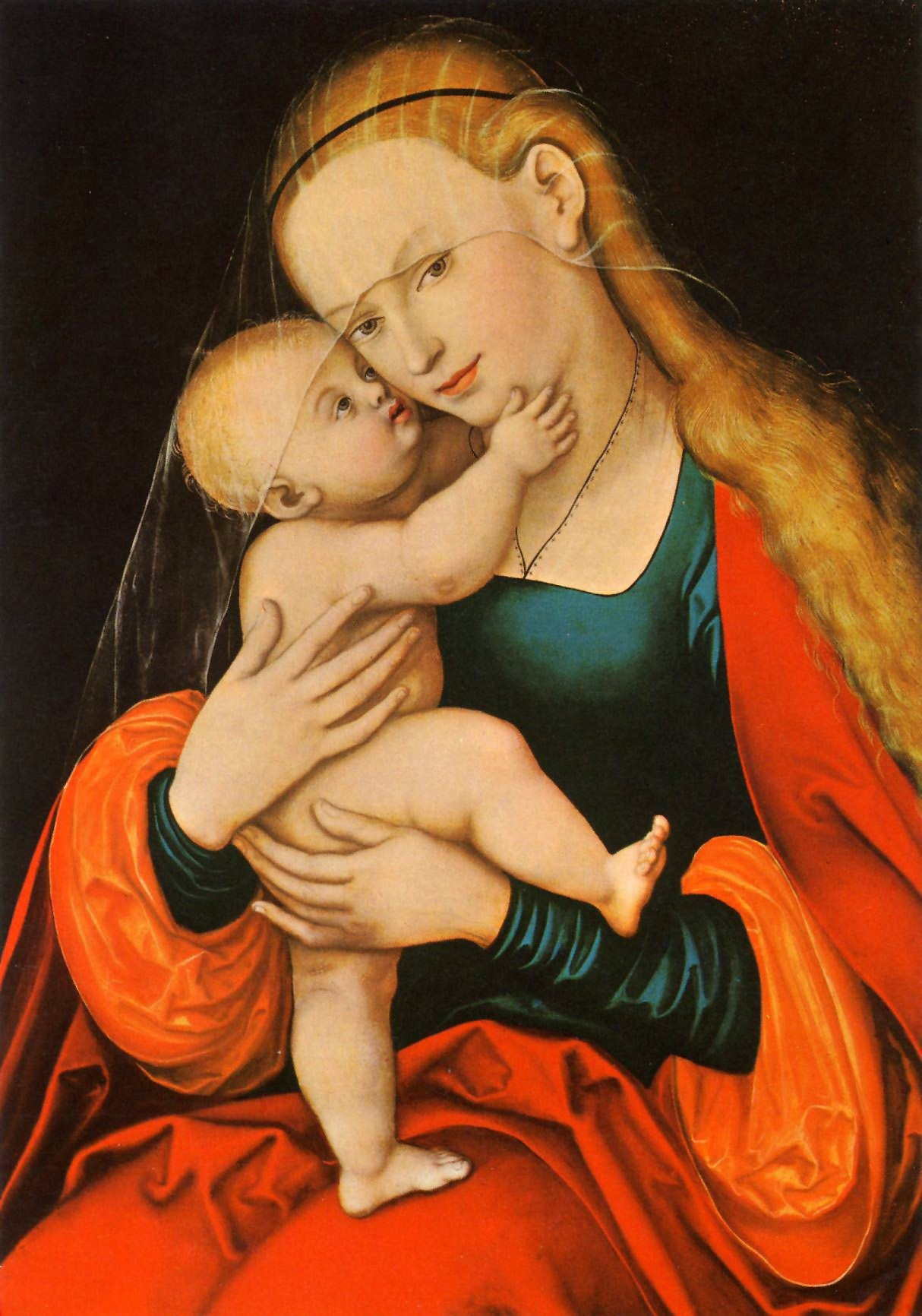
Mariahilf. Lucas Cranach the Elder, c. 1520, Cathedral of St. Jakob in Innsbruck

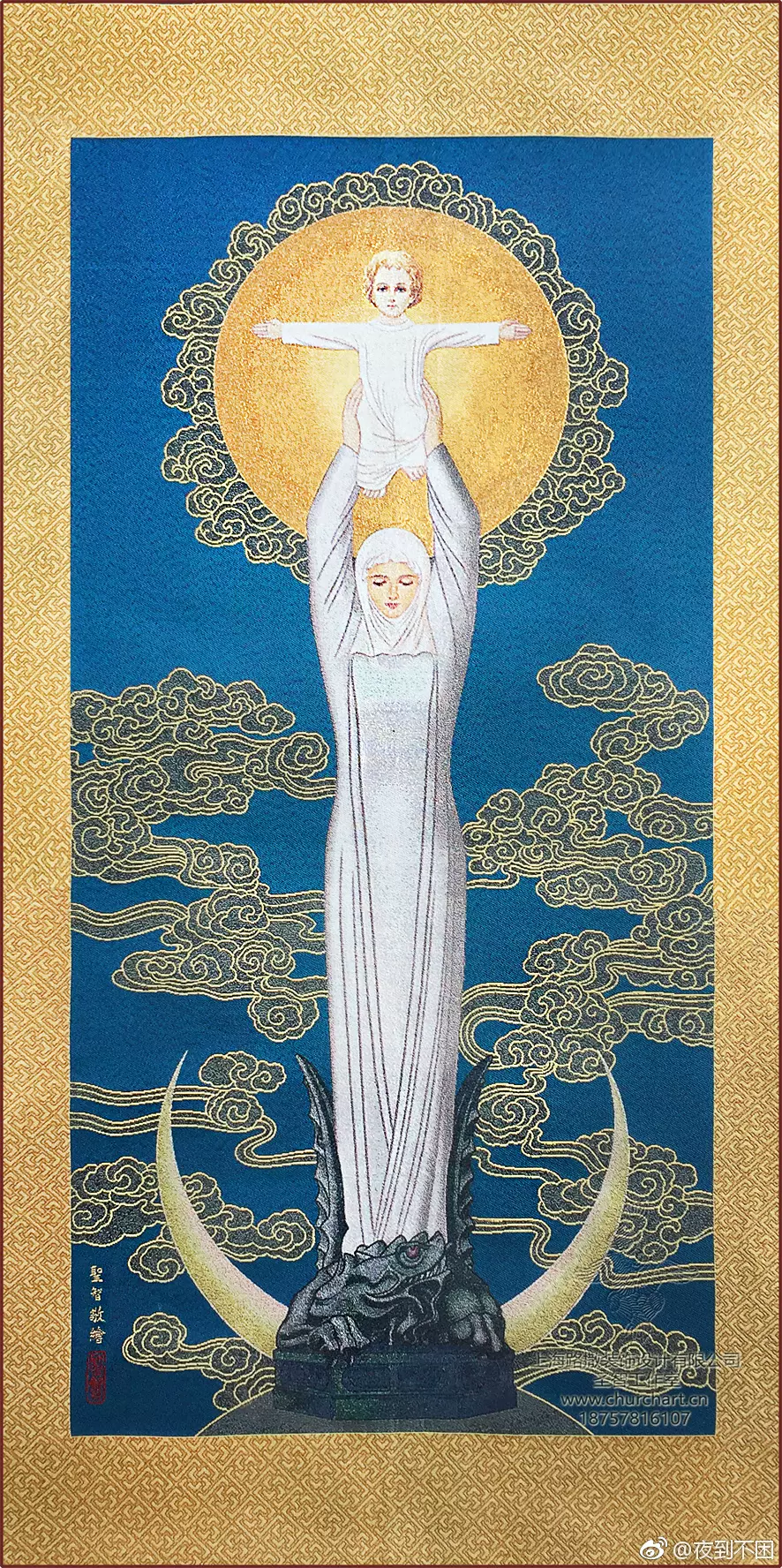
Image of Our Lady of Sheshan, Help of Christians as it appears atop the exterior cupola of the Sheshan Basilica. This rendition above is created by Holy Wisdom Catholic Decoration and Art Design Studio (圣智天主教装饰与艺术品工作室) in Shanghai.

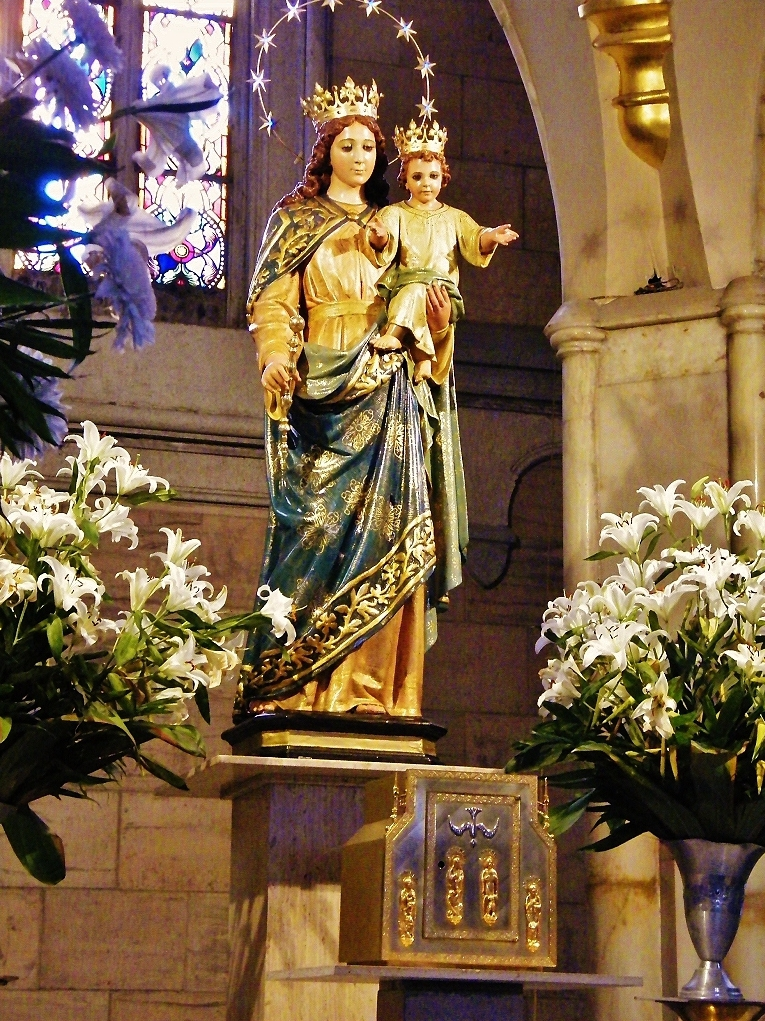
Statue at the shrine of Our Lady Help of Christians, in Miguel Hidalgo of Federal District, Mexico

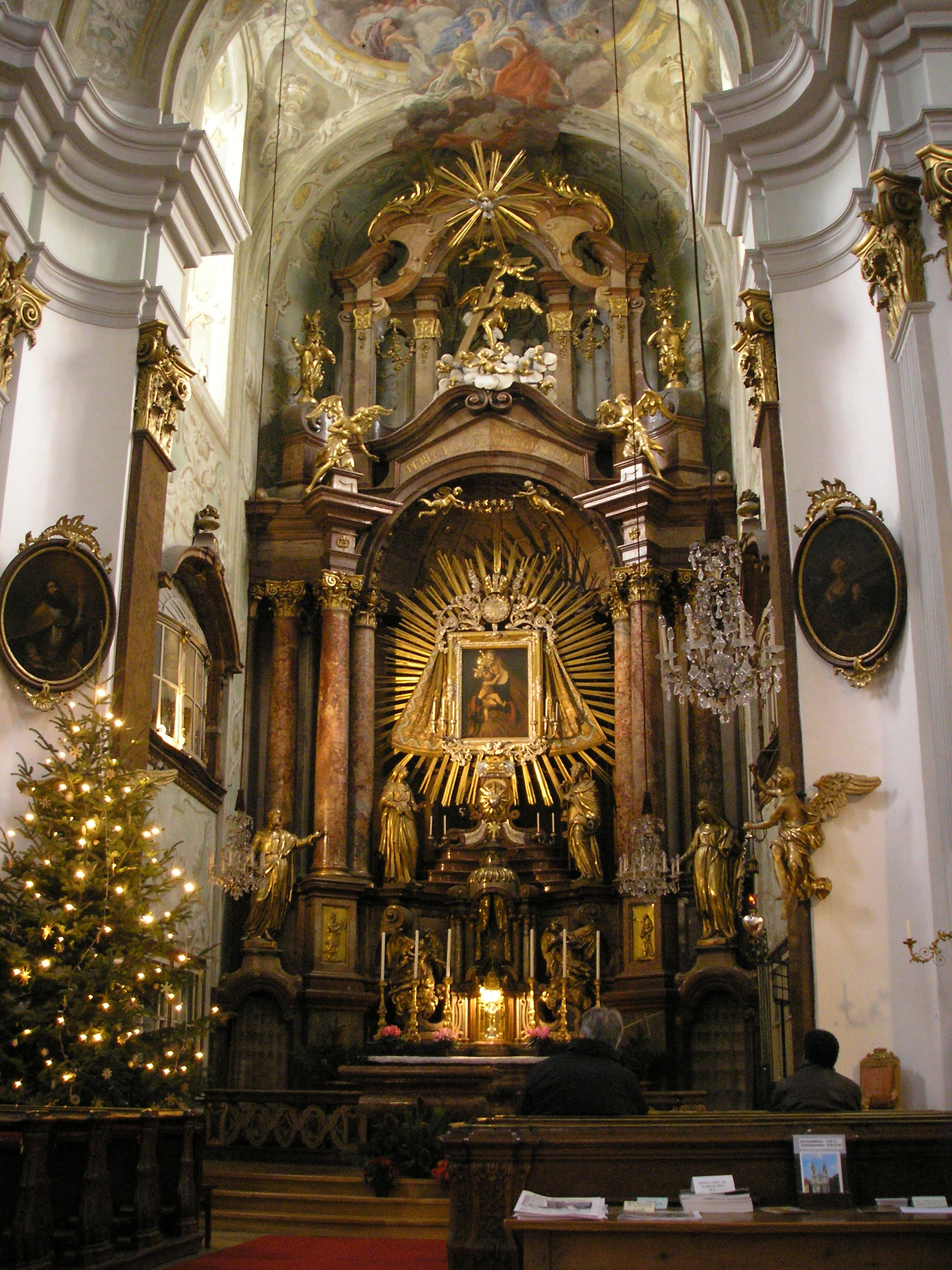
Altar at Mariahilf church Vienna

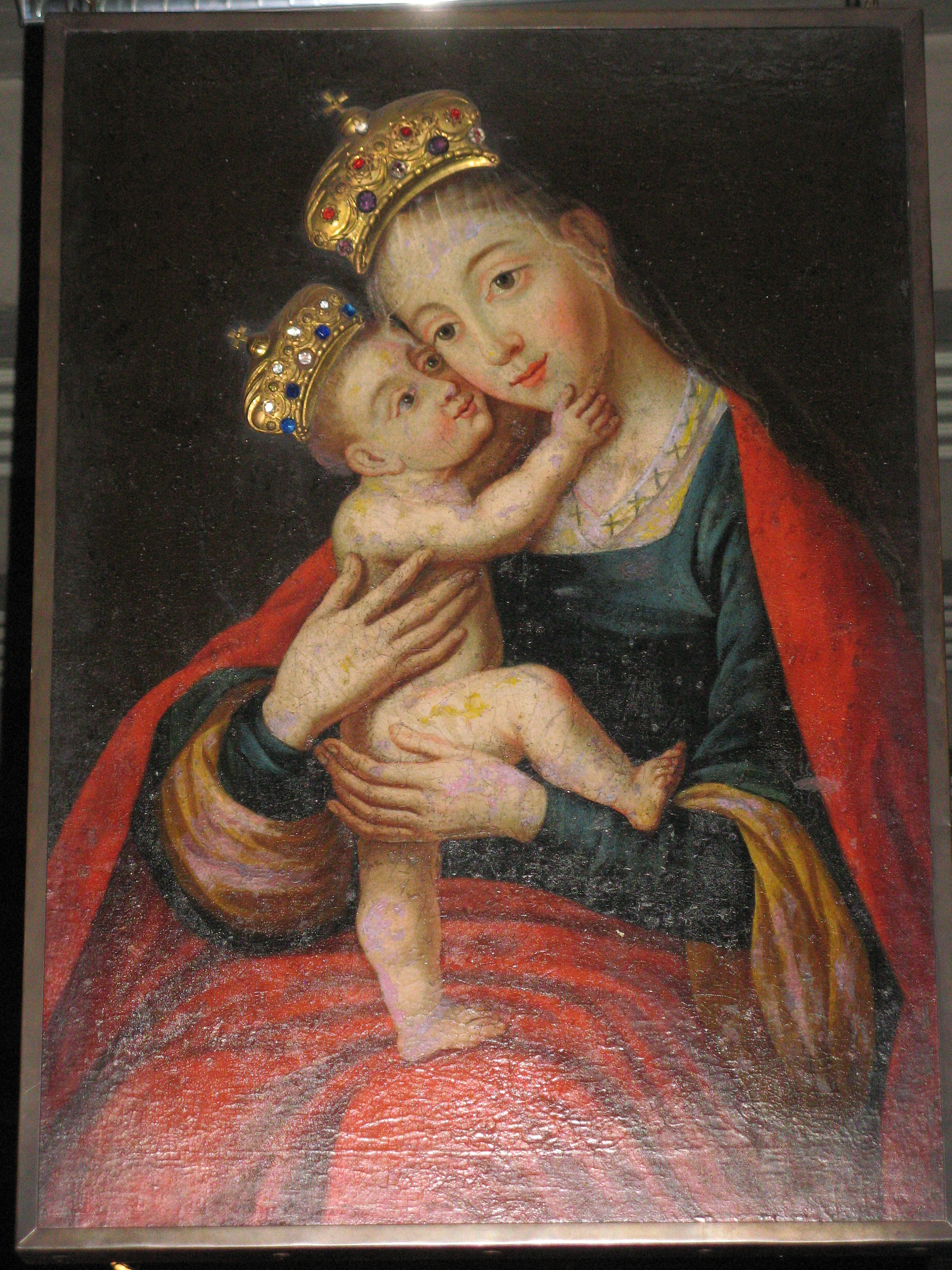
18th-century painting at Matzleinsdorf church, Austria

== See also ==
- Roman Catholic Marian churches
- Shrines to the Virgin Mary
