= Sheshan =

Mountain in China

Coordinates: 31°05′35″N 121°11′35″E

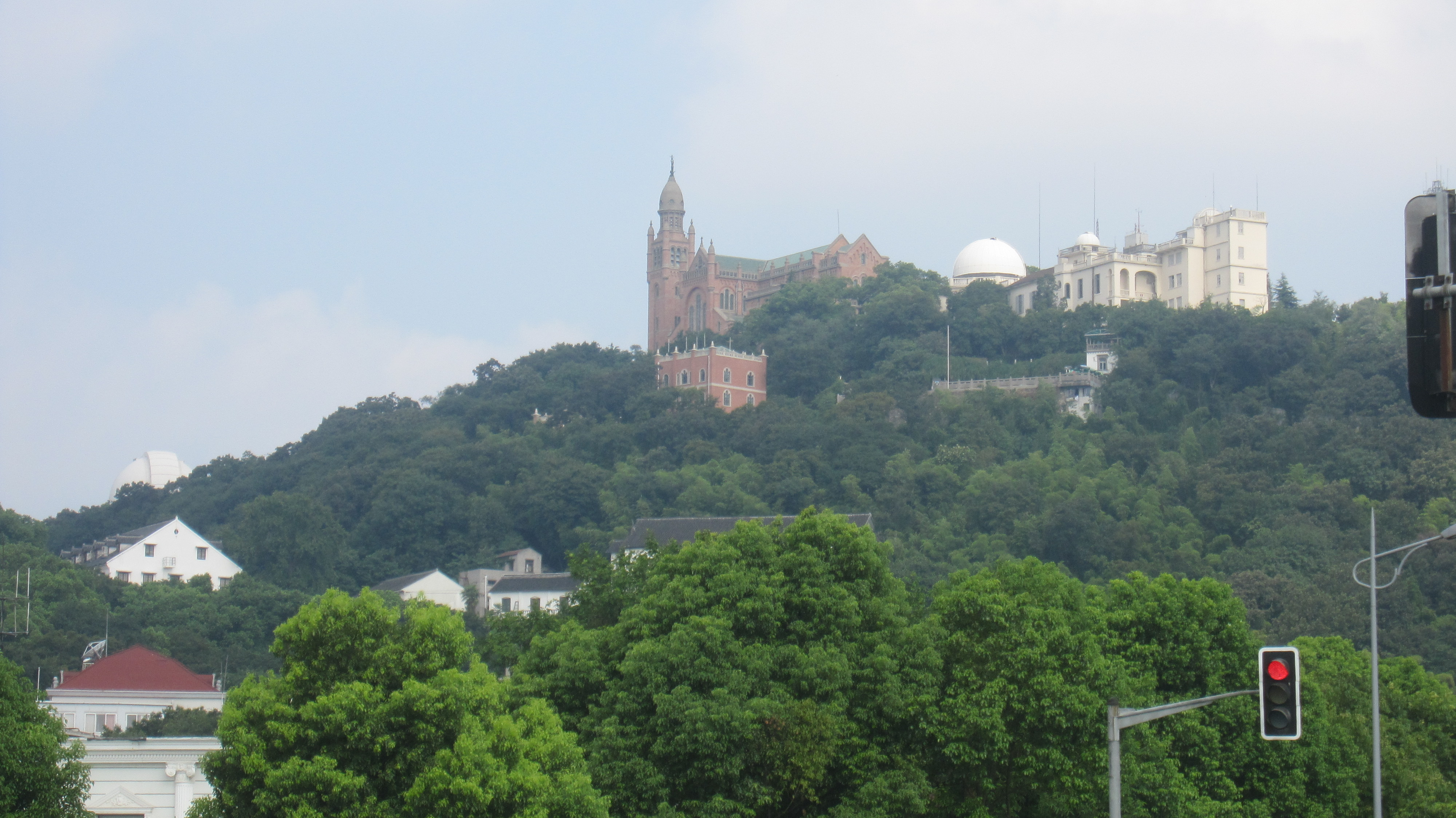
- Sheshan, its observatory, and Our Lady of Sheshan Cathedral
- Chinese: 佘山
- Literal meaning: She Hill(s)
Transcriptions
Standard Mandarin
- Hanyu Pinyin: Shéshān
- Wade–Giles: She Shan
Wu
- Romanization: Zosè

Sheshan (literally, "She Mountain"), known in Shanghainese as Zose, is a pair of hills in Songjiang District in western Shanghai, China. The two hills are distinguished as East and West Sheshan, although the more important western hill is also called Sheshan on its own. East Sheshan has an elevation of 100.8 m (331 ft) and West Sheshan has an elevation of 118 m (387 ft), it is the highest point in Shanghai, there is a small valley between them. The area around the two hills is a forest park.

== History ==
Historically, Sheshan had many temples.

The Kangxi Emperor visited in 1720.

French Jesuits began buying land in the area in the early 1860s. They built a sanitarium, a small church next to it, and later a pavilion with a statue of Mary.

During the Taiping Rebellion, Catholics in the area pledged to construct a church dedicated to Mary if they were spared from the chaos. Jesuits began building a hilltop church in 1864 and dedicated it in the early 1870s.

The hilltop church was replaced in 1935 with a baroque-style church which is one of the largest Catholic churches in Asia.

In 1982, the Sheshan seminary opened with Aloysius Jin Luxian as its rector. It was the first seminary of the patriotic church to open during the Reform era.

== Basilica ==
It is surmounted by the Our Lady of China Catholic church, Sheshan Basilica, which was built there between 1922 and 1936 following the establishment of a chapel in 1867, soon replaced by a first church in 1871–1873 by French Jesuit missionaries. Services in the church are held in Chinese and Latin. The road to the top of Sheshan hill represents the stations of the cross Via Dolorosa (The Way of Suffering) that Christ took to his crucifixion. Every May pilgrims flock to the chapel and the holy road by the hundreds.

== Observatory ==
The hill also houses an observatory founded in 1900 by Jesuits, the Sheshan Observatory. In addition to scientific equipment of the modern era, it displays a replica of a Han dynasty earthquake monitoring device, consisting of a jar with dragon heads mounted around the outside and a pendulum inside. Each dragon has a steel ball in its mouth. When an earthquake occurred, the pendulum would swing, knock a dragon causing its mouth to open and a ball to drop out thereby indicating the quake's direction. The observatory has been renovated and reopened as a museum in May 2023.

== Transportation ==
Sheshan is in the vicinity of Sheshan Station on Line 9 of the Shanghai Metro.

== See also ==
- Sheshan Golf Club
