= Sheshan Observatory =

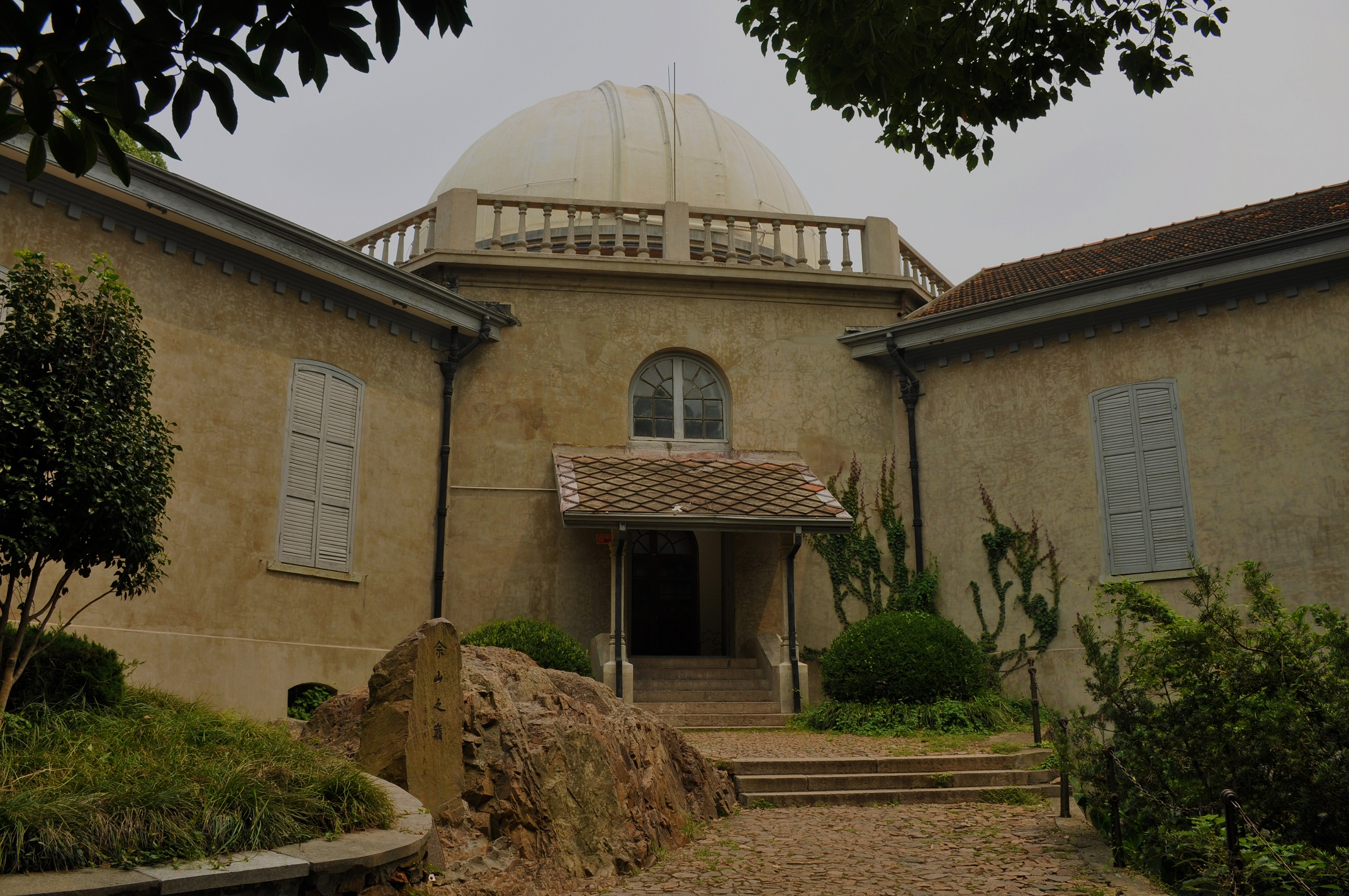
- Observatory code: 337
- Location: Sheshan, Songjiang, Shanghai, PRC
- Coordinates: 31°05′47″N 121°11′19″E
- Related media on Commons

The Sheshan Observatory (Chinese: 佘山天文台; pinyin: Shéshān tiānwéntái) is an observatory on Sheshan Hill in Shanghai.

== History ==
It was built by French Jesuits around 1899 and is one of the oldest astronomical observatory in China (it also hosts one of China's oldest astronomical telescopes).

The observatory was nationalised in the 1950s.

In 1962, Sheshan Observatory was merged with Xujiahui Observatory and was renamed the Sheshan Station of the Shanghai Astronomical Observatory.

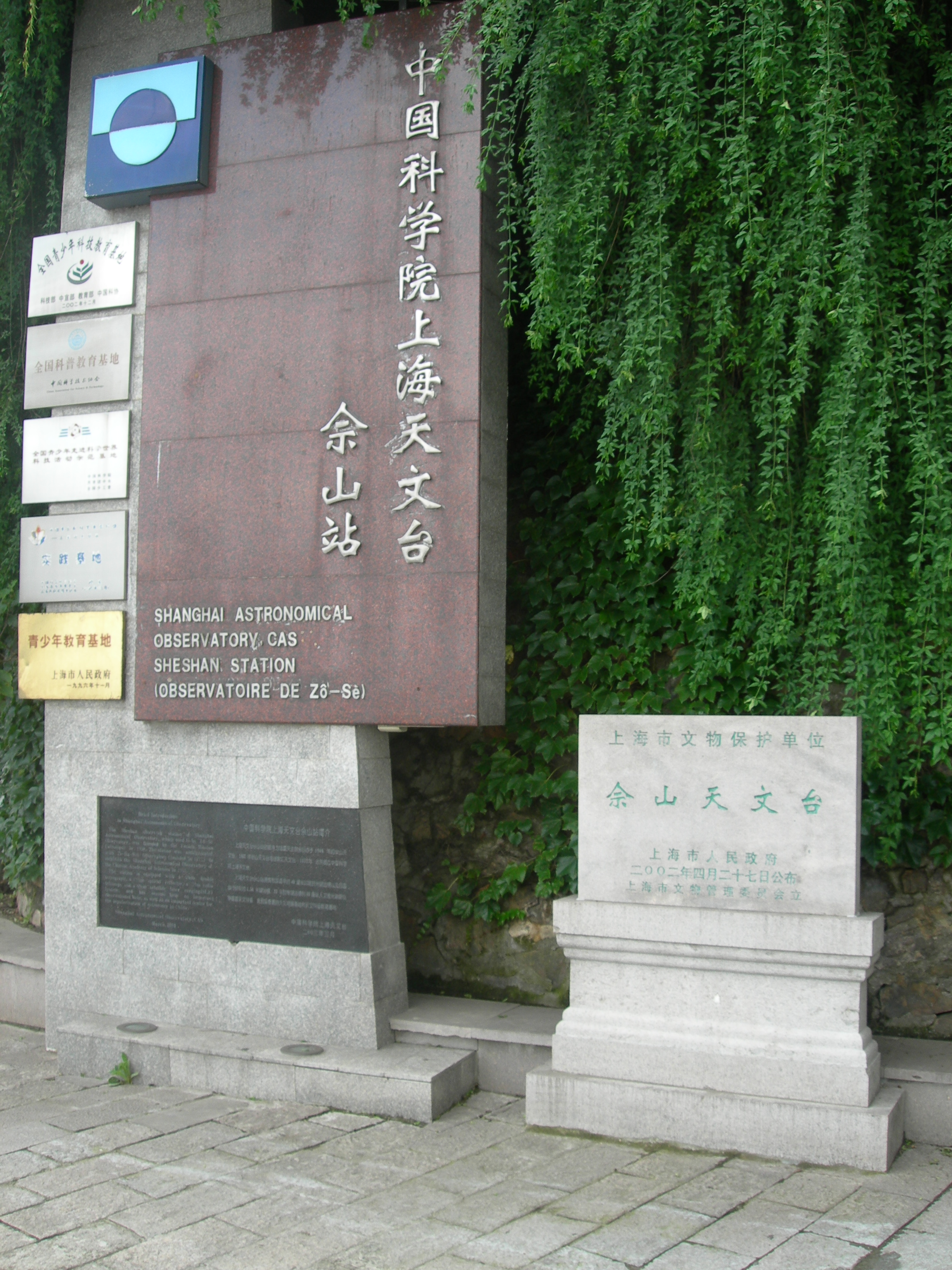
Signs in Chinese and English, near the entrance.

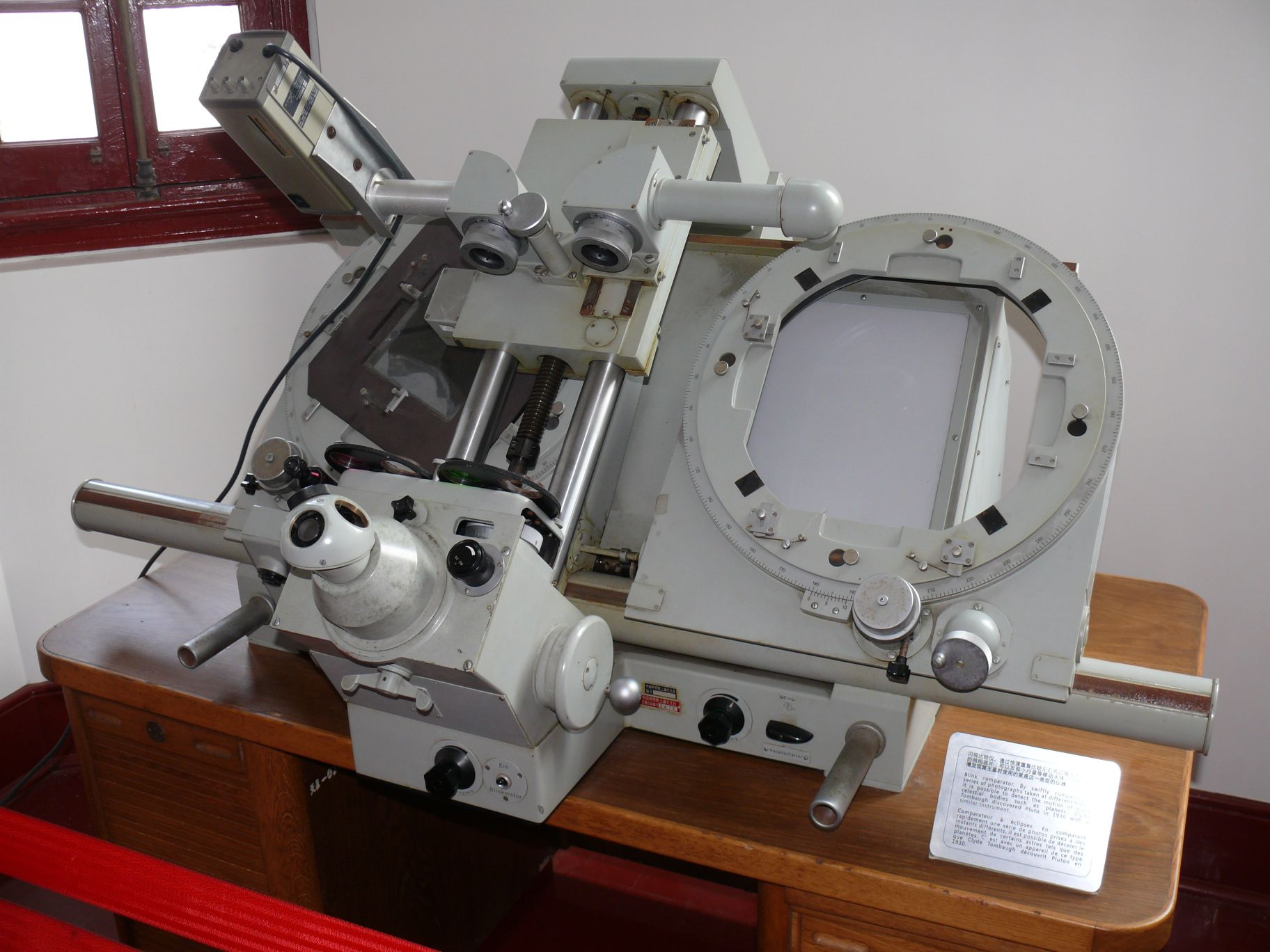
A blink comparator, with explanations in Chinese, English and French.

== See also ==
- List of astronomical observatories

== Notes and references ==
31.093°N 121.193°E
