= Zou Yixin =

Chinese astronomer

Zou Yixin or Chou Yi-Hsin (1911–1997) was a Chinese astronomer, who has been called "the first female astronomer in China"., she graduated from zhongshan (sun yat‐sen ) university, department of astronomy and practiced in observatory in Japan 2 years later in 1935, and took part in Japan on a total eclipse observation and was teaching staff in sun yat‐sen university, and the observatory director.

From 1948 to 1949, she studied and worked in British Royal Observatory, Greenwich, Edinburgh observatory and solar physics observatory. And then, during 1951 she was a science researcher at the Purple Mountain Observatory, and from 1957 to 1958, she studied in the general observatory of Soviet union and at the Beijing Astronomical Observatory in 1958, where she was a director of the latitude station of Beijing Observatory.
