= October 1926 =

Month of 1926

<<	October 1926					>>
Su	Mo	Tu	We	Th	Fr	Sa
					1	2
3	4	5	6	7	8	9
10	11	12	13	14	15	16
17	18	19	20	21	22	23
24	25	26	27	28	29	30
31

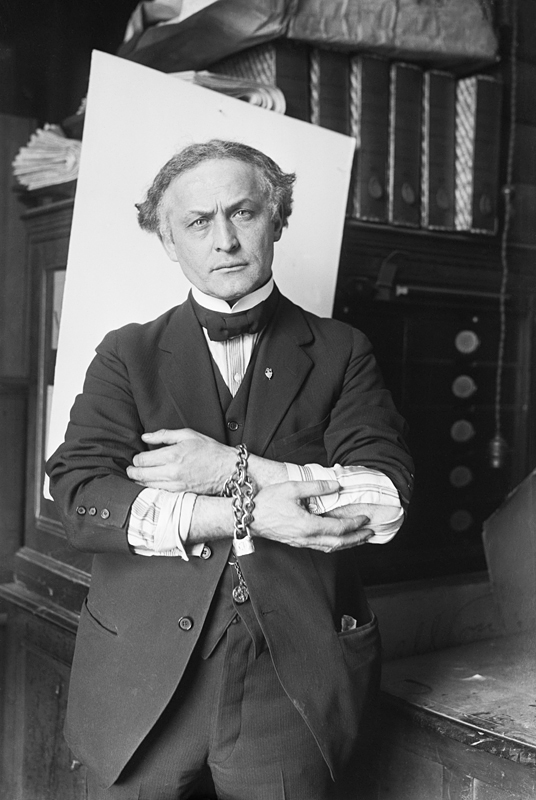
October 31, 1926: Famed magician Harry Houdini dies nine days after being injured

The following events occurred in October 1926:

== October 1, 1926 (Friday) ==
- Electrosurgery was performed at the first time as Dr. Harvey Cushing used an electrosurgical device in an operation for removal of a mass from a patient's head at the Brigham and Women's Hospital in Boston.
- English pilot Alan Cobham landed his de Havilland seaplane on the River Thames to complete a 28,000-mile flight from England to Australia and back.Cobham had departed from Rochester, Kent in England on June 30, making multiple stops in a route survey flight for Imperial Airways and arriving at Melbourne in Australia on August 15. After leaving Melbourne on August 29, he mad multiple stops on the way back and landed on the Thames after making a round trip of 32,000 miles (51,000 km) over a 78-day period. He was met at his landing by Sir Samuel Hoare, the British Secretary of State for Air.
- In the U.S., 27-year-old oil rig worker Wiley Post, who had an act as a parachutist for a traveling circus, lost his left eye in a work accident. He would use the money from his injury settlement to buy an airplane, and go on to become a world-famous aviator.
- Born:
  - Manfred Messerschmidt, German military historian; in Dortmund (d. 2022)

== October 2, 1926 (Saturday) ==
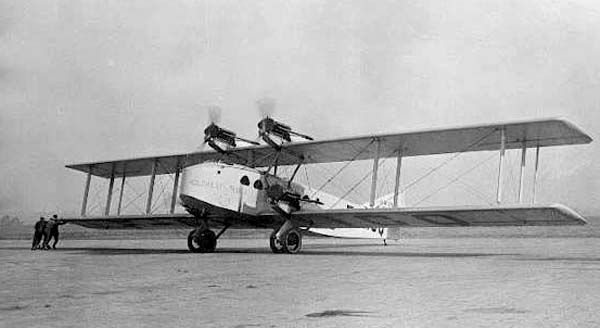
The ill-fated Air Union airliner

- All seven people aboard an Air Union airliner were killed following the first in-flight fire in airline history when the Blériot 155 air plane sustained an engine fire at crashed at Leigh, Kent.
- Józef Piłsudski became Prime Minister of Poland after being appointed by President Ignacy Mościcki to replace Kazimierz Bartel.
- The drama film The Ice Flood opened.
- Born:
  - Jan Morris (Catherine Jan Morris), Welsh historian, journalist and mountaineer on the 1953 British Mount Everest expedition; in Clevedon, Somerset, as James Humphry Morris, before gender transitioning in 1972 (d. 2020)

== October 3, 1926 (Sunday) ==
- Father Charles Coughlin began his weekly sermons on station WJR in Detroit.
- The first Islamic temple in London, the Fazl Mosque, was opened at Southfields, Wandsworth.
- The Domica Cave was discovered in what is now southern Slovakia near the town of Plešivec, Slovakia, by Ján Majko.
- The first no-hitter in a major league postseason game was pitched by Red Grier of the Bacharach Giants in Game 3 of the Colored World Series, against the Chicago American Giants.

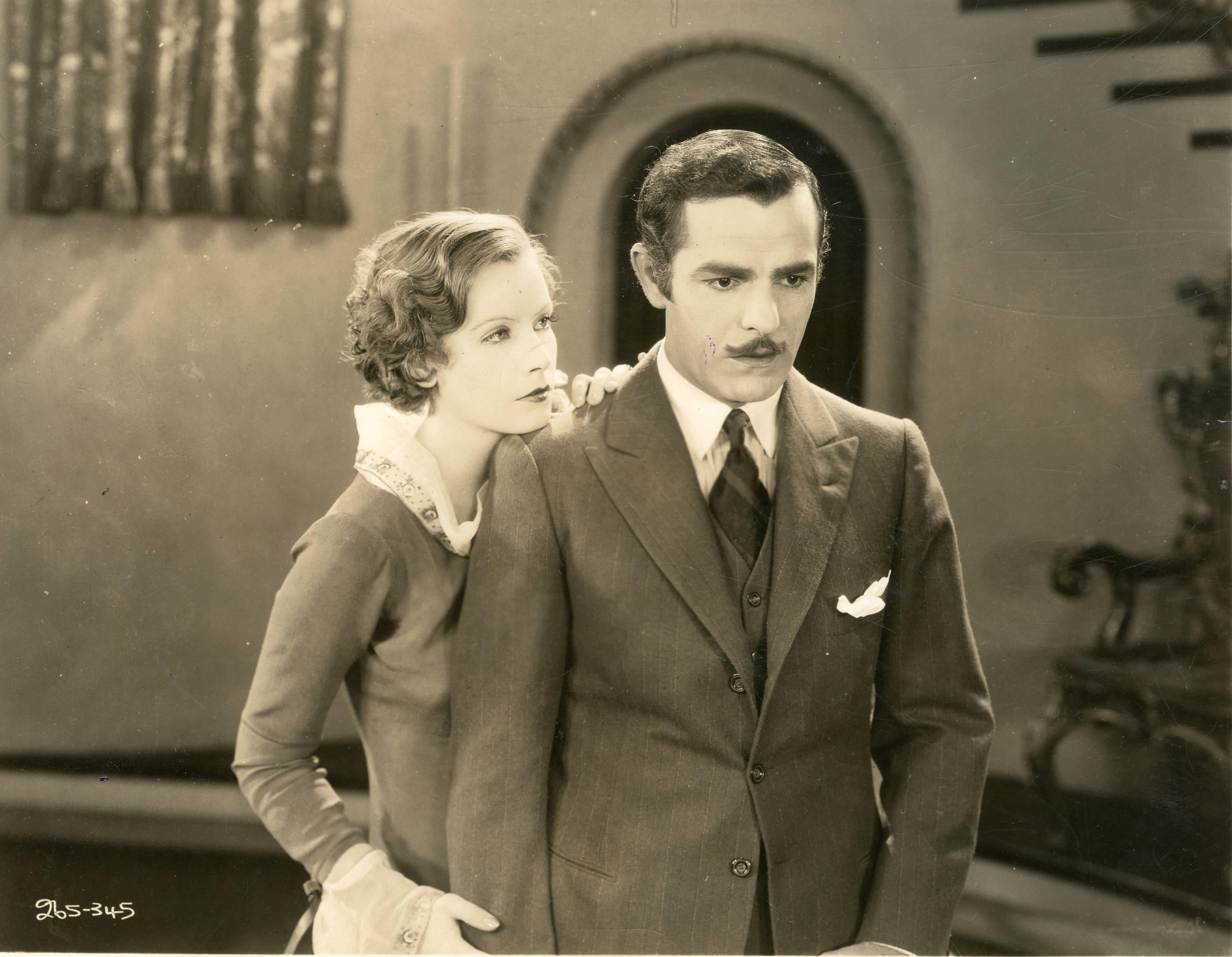
Greta Garbo with Antonio Moreno in The Temptress

- The drama film The Temptress, distributed by MGM and starring Greta Garbo, Antonio Moreno and Lionel Barrymore premiered.
- Born:
  - Harvey Matusow, American Communist who later became an informant for the FBI; in New York City (d. 2002)

== October 4, 1926 (Monday) ==
- As part of Mustafa Kemal Atatürk's reforms of Turkey, all Islamic courts were closed as the new Turkish civil code went into effect.
- A labour dispute of coal miners in Britain ended as the remaining miners returned to work with miners' representatives making local settlements with pit owners. Over 170,000 miners had gone back to work by this time.
- The Mexican rebellion spread to southern Guanajuato as former general Rodolfo Gallegos led an uprising there.
- An explosion killed 32 miners at an underground coal mine owned by the Roane Iron Company near Rockwood, Tennessee.
- Carbon monoxide poisoning at Switzerland's Ricken Tunnel killed six crew of a freight train and three men who attempted to rescue them.
- Chemists Frederic Joliot and Irene Curie, who would jointly win the Nobel Prize in Chemistry in 1935, were married in Paris and adopted the hyphenated surname Joliot-Curie.
- The 15-minute radio program Housekeepers' Chat, sponsored by the U.S. Department of Agriculture and featuring the fictional "Aunt Sammy" (billed as the wife of "Uncle Sam". At its height, Housekeepers' Chat would be heard on 194 radio stations, each one having its own performer reading the script for the role of Aunt Sammy, and running until 1934.

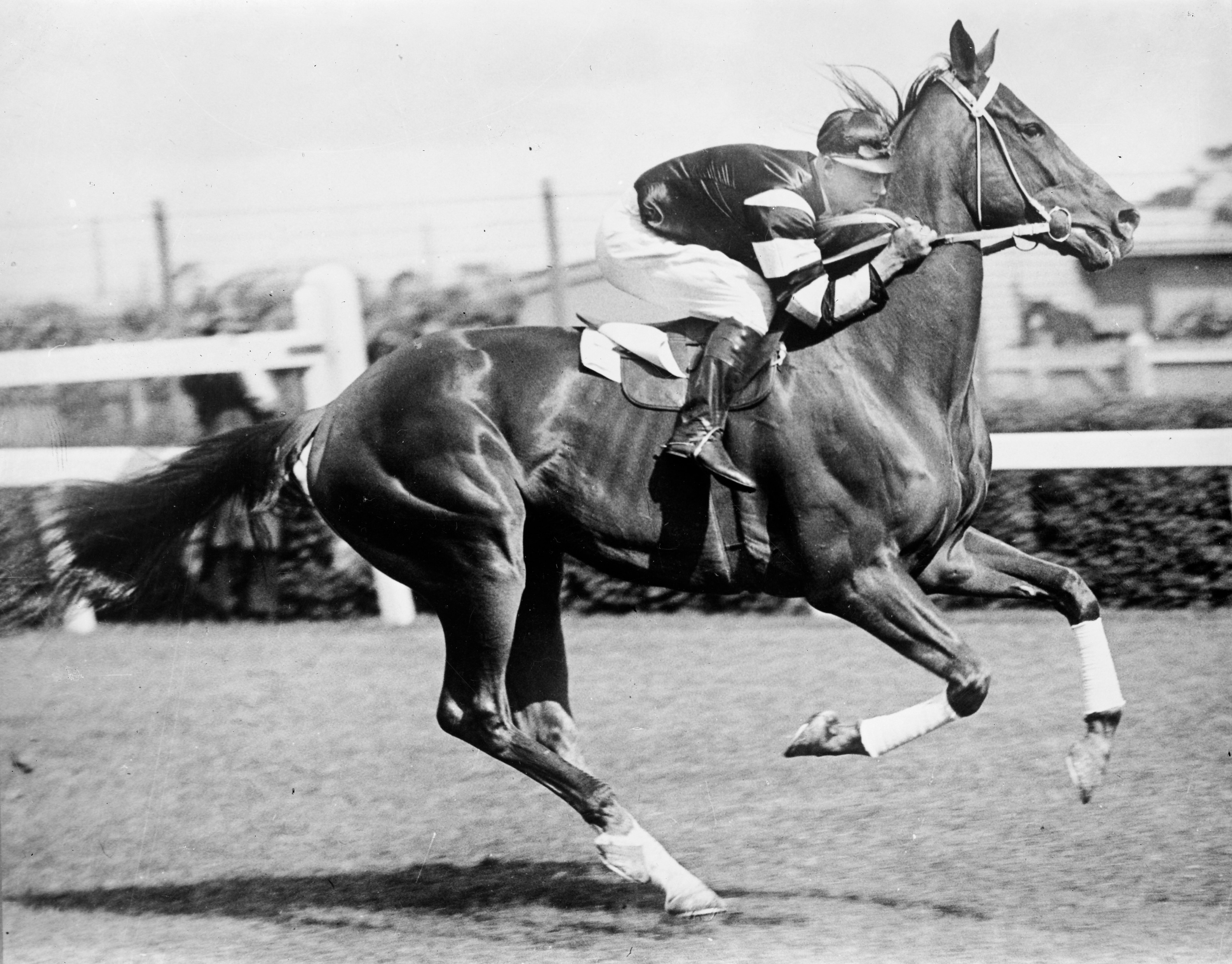
Phar Lap, carrying Jim Pike

- Born:
  - Phar Lap, New Zealand-born Australian throughbred considered one of the greatest race horses of all time (d. 1932)
  - Kazuhiko Nishijima, Japanese particle physicist known for the Gell-Mann–Nishijima formula; in Tsuchiura, Ibaraki Prefecture (d. 2009)
  - Raymond Watson, American businessman who served as the president of the largest real estate developer in the U.S., the Irvine Company, and Chairman of the Board of The Walt Disney Company; in Seattle (d. 2012)
- Born: Georgi Georgiev-Getz, Bulgarian film and stage actor, known for A Peasant on a Bicycle (Selyaninat s Koleloto) (1974)
- Died: Annie Trumbull Slosson, 88, American entomologist and fiction writer

== October 5, 1926 (Tuesday) ==
- The first radio orchestra in Japan, the New Symphony Orchestra performed its first concert, as conducted by Hidemaro Konoye.
- The Mikhail Bulgakov play Days of the Turbins (Dni Turbinykh) premiered at the Moscow Art Theatre under the direction of Konstantin Stanislavsky. The four act play was based upon Bulgakov's novel, The White Guard.
- Born:
  - Baji Rout, Indian boy who became a martyr for the Indian independence movement at the age of 12 when he was shot by the Imperial Police for refusing to ferry police across the Brahmani River; at Nilakanthapur, Bihar and Orissa Province , British India (killed 1938)
- Died:
  - Saint Bartolo Longo, 85, Italian lawyer and former Satanist who converted to Roman Catholicism in 1862. He would be canonized by Pope Leo XIV in 2025.
  - Dorothy Tennant, 71, English painter and wife of explorer Henry Stanley

== October 6, 1926 (Wednesday) ==
- Pennsylvania's blue laws from 1794 were invoked in Pittsburgh, banning all Sunday sports in the city of Pittsburgh.
- In Game 4 of the World Series, Babe Ruth became the first player in the fall classic to hit three home runs, in a 10 to 5 win over the St. Louis Cardinals. The feat would not be matched again until 1977 (by Reggie Jackson for the Yankees against the Los Angeles Dodgers), and then again in 2011 by Albert Pujols (for the Cardinals against the Texas Rangers).
- Born:
  - Howard Stein, American financier and a founder of the first "no load" money market fund and the first tax-free municipal bond fund; in Brooklyn, New York City.

== October 7, 1926 (Thursday) ==
- The Vietnamese religion Caodaism, with more than an estimated six million adherents worldwide, was formally established in Saigon (now Ho Chi Minh City) by Ngo Van Chieu with the signing of the "Declaration of the Founding of the Cao Đài Religion".
- Choral Evensong, one of the longest-running radio programmes in history, was broadcast for the first time, making its debut on the British Broadcasting Company with a 15-minute airing of the Evensong, the Anglican church afternoon prayer, at 3:00 pm. The first 15-minute episode was relayed live from Westminster Abbey. Choral Evensong, broadcast weekly, is now in its 100th year.
- Born:
  - Czeslaw Ryll-Nardzewski, Polish mathematician known for the Ryll-Nardzewski fixed point theorem; Wilno, Second Polish Republic (now Vilnius, Lithuania) (d. 2015)
  - Opal Lee, African-American teacher, Presidential Medal of Freedom recipient, and activist who succeeded in having Juneteenth (June 19) recognized as a federal holiday in 2021; in Marshall, Texas (alive in 2026)
  - Jim Allen, English playwright for radio and television; in Miles Platting, Manchester (d. 1999)"Jim Allen", by Ken Loach, The Guardian, June 25, 1999
- Died:
  - Emil Kraepelin, 70, German psychiatrist

== October 8, 1926 (Friday) ==
- A methane explosion killed 124 coal miners at the Durban Navigation Colliery at Durnacol in South Africa, in what remains the deadliest mine disaster in South African history. All but four of the persons killed were black or coloured South Africans.

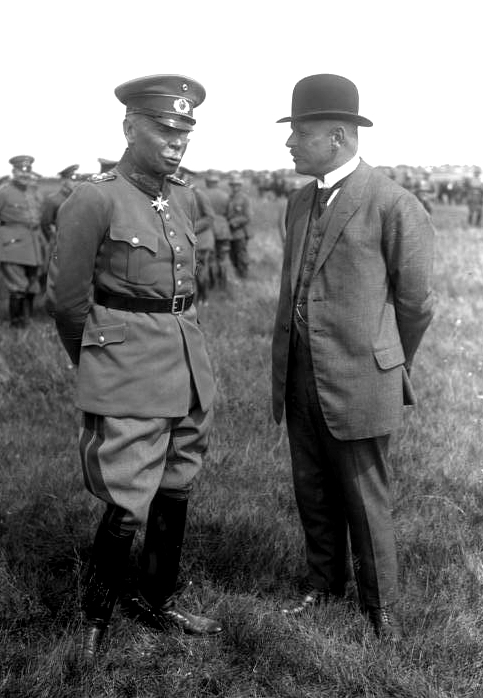
General Von Seeckt in 1926, shortly before his dismissal by minister of defense Gessler, who dismissed him

- German General Hans von Seeckt was forced to resign as head of the Reichswehr after republicans objected to his permitting Prince Wilhelm, grandson of the former Kaiser Wilhelm III and second-in-line for succession at the time the German monarchy was abolished, to take part in military maneuvers in the uniform of the old Imperial First Foot Guards without first getting permission from the government.
- Buckminster Fuller and his father-in-law, James Monroe Hewlett, applied for the patent for the Stockade Building System, with blocks made of compressed wood fiber coated with plaster. They would receive U.S. Patent No. 1,633,702 on June 28, 1927.
- Born:
  - Raaj Kumar (stage name for Kulbhushan Pandit), Indian film star, known for Mother India (1957), Dil Apna Aur Preet Parai (1960), and Karmayogi (1978); in Loralai, Baluchistan province, British India (now in Balochistan province in Pakistan) (d. 1996)
  - Krzysztof Skubiszewski, Foreign Minister of Poland from 1989 to 1993; in Poznań (d. 2010)
  - William Greaves, African-American actor and filmmaker; in New York City (d. 2014)
- Died:
  - William Dwight Porter Bliss, 70, American Episcopalian priest and activist for the Christian socialism movement

== October 9, 1926 (Saturday) ==
- Benito Mussolini made himself the head of Italy's national militia, giving himself personal command of all the armed forces in the country.
- Melbourne defeated Collingwood, 17.17 to 9.8 (119 to 62) to win the championship of Australian rules football in the Victorian Football League, in front of 59,632 spectators at the Melbourne Cricket Ground.
- Born:
  - Shi Jiuyong, Chinese judge and President of the International Court of Justice from 2013 to 2010 after serving as one of the associate judges since 1994; in Ningbo, Zhejiang Province (d. 2022)
  - Ruth Ellis, Welsh-born English murderer and the last woman in the United Kingdom to be executed; as Ruth Neilson in Rhyl, Denbighshire (hanged, 1955)
  - Danièle Delorme (stage name for Gabrielle Daniele Girard), French actress and film producer; in Levallois-Perret, Hauts-de-Seine département (d. 2015)
  - Yevgeny Yevstigneyev, Soviet Russian stage and film actor; in Nizhny Novgorod, Russian SFSR, Soviet Union (d. 1992)

== October 10, 1926 (Sunday) ==
- The St. Louis Cardinals won the 1926 World Series, defeating the New York Yankees in Game 7 by a score of 3 to 2 in extra innings. The final out of the Series came when the Yankees' Babe Ruth was caught while trying to steal second base with two outs in the 10th inning, only one strike on batter Bob Meusel and Lou Gehrig up next to bat.
- The National Peasants' Party (Partidul Național Țărănesc or PNT) was organized in Romania from a merger of the Romanian National Party and the between the Peasants' Party, under the leadership of Iuliu Maniu. Led by Iuliu Maniu, the PNT would control the Romanian parliament by 1928.
- In the Republic of China, the Kuomintang captured Wuchang after a 40-day siege.
- A strike and boycott between Hong Kong labor unions and the British government of Hong Kong ended after 16 months, with a compromise settlement.
- Born:
  - Alastair Hanton, British banker credited with the 1964 invention of the automatic debit transfer system in banking; in London (d. 2021)
  - Margaret Gwenver, American stage and television actor best-known for her recurring role for 30 years in the soap opera The Guiding Light from 1979 to 2009; in Wilmington, Delaware (d. 2010)
  - Joan Helpern, American shoe designer and co-founder (with her husband David Halpern of the Joan & David Shoes company; in the Bronx, New York City (d. 2016)
- Died:
  - Pierre Decourcelle, 70, French playwright and novelist

== October 11, 1926 (Monday) ==
- A brief notice was published in the Soviet newspaper Izvestia announcing that Leon Trotsky, Grigory Zinoviev and Georgy Pyatakov would be placed on trial on October 20 for being overly critical of decisions made at the last Communist Party conference.
- The Conservative Party of Canada elected Hugh Guthrie as their new leader following the resignation of Arthur Meighen as Prime Minister after the Conservatives were defeated in the September 14 election for the House of Commons. Voting for the party leader and Leader of the Opposition was made at a meeting of all the candidates in the election, both those defeated and those who became MPs. Guthrie won the needed majority on the third ballot.
- Born:
  - Thích Nhất Hạnh, Buddhist monk; as Nguyen Xuan Bao in Huế, French Indochina (d. 2022)
  - Jean Alexander (stage name for Jean Margaret Hodgkinson), British television actress on Coronation Street (1964–1987) and Last of the Summer Wine (1998 to 2010); in Toxteth, Liverpool (d. 2016)
- Died:
  - Hymie Weiss (born Henryk Wojciechowski), 28, Polish-born American gangster and leader of Chicago's North Side Gang, was shot to death at the corner of State Street and Superior Avenue, along with fellow North Side gangster Paddy Murray, by two hit men of the Capone gang. The slaying came in retaliation for the North Side Gang's unsuccessful attempt to kill Al Capone.
  - Henry L. Fuqua, 60, U.S. politician and Governor of Louisiana since 1924

== October 12, 1926 (Tuesday) ==
- The Condé Diamond, a famous rose-coloured diamond that once belonged to the seventeenth century general Louis, Grand Condé, was stolen along with other valuables from the Condé Museum in Chantilly, Oise in France. Ladders were used to scale the exterior wall and the gem tower and the glass was cut from the windows.
- African-American boxer Harry Wills, who had held the World Colored Heavyweight Championship since 1918, lost his title when he was disqualified in the 13th round for illegal use of a backhand blow, in a bout with white heavyweight boxer Jack Sharkey.
- Born:
  - Hedy Graf, Spanish-born Swiss opera soprano; in Barcelona (d. 1997)
  - Percy Savage, Australian celebrity fashion publicist; in Brisbane (d. 2008)

== October 13, 1926 (Wednesday) ==
- The U.S. Supreme Court ruled that government directives to change clocks for daylight saving time were constitutional. Several Massachusetts labor unions had brought forward a case arguing that it was unconstitutional because the confusion that it caused with train scheduling resulted in pecuniary loss and was "otherwise obnoxious".

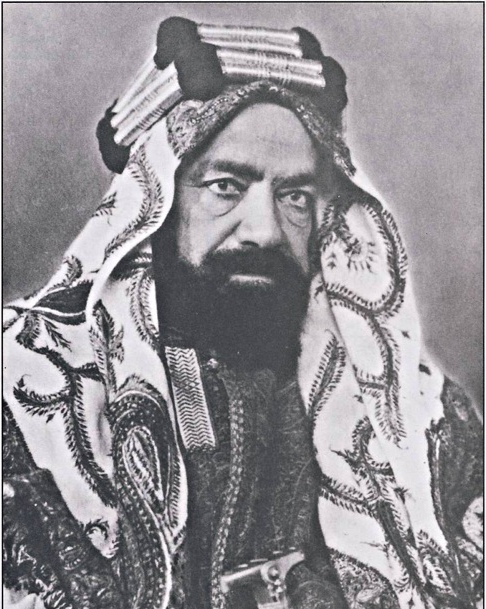
Sheikh Hamad al-Khalifa

- Sheikh Hamad ibn Isa Al Khalifa, the Deputy Ruler of Bahrain at the time, survived an assassination attempt as his Hudson car drove on a bridge over a small creek in the village of Sanabis. The perpetrators hid behind a hedge, and were captured after nearly three years of police investigation headed by Haji Sulman bin Jasim and the Amir of Muharraq, Mohamed bin Jabr. They were identified as Hassawis, from the province of Al-Hasa in what is now Saudi Arabia.
- Comments from British Labour Party MP Alfred Salter were published in the Daily Express in which he said that drunkenness was a frequent sight in the House of Commons.
- Born:
  - Jesse L. Brown, United States Navy officer and the first black U.S. Navy aviator, and posthumous Medal of Honor recipient; in Hattiesburg, Mississippi (killed in crash during Korean War, 1950)
  - Walter "Killer" Kowalski (ring name for Edward Spulnik), Canadian-born U.S. professional wrestler; in Windsor, Ontario (d. 2008)
  - Kazuo Nakamura, Canadian painter of Japanese ancestry; in Vancouver, British Columbia (d. 2002)

== October 14, 1926 (Thursday) ==
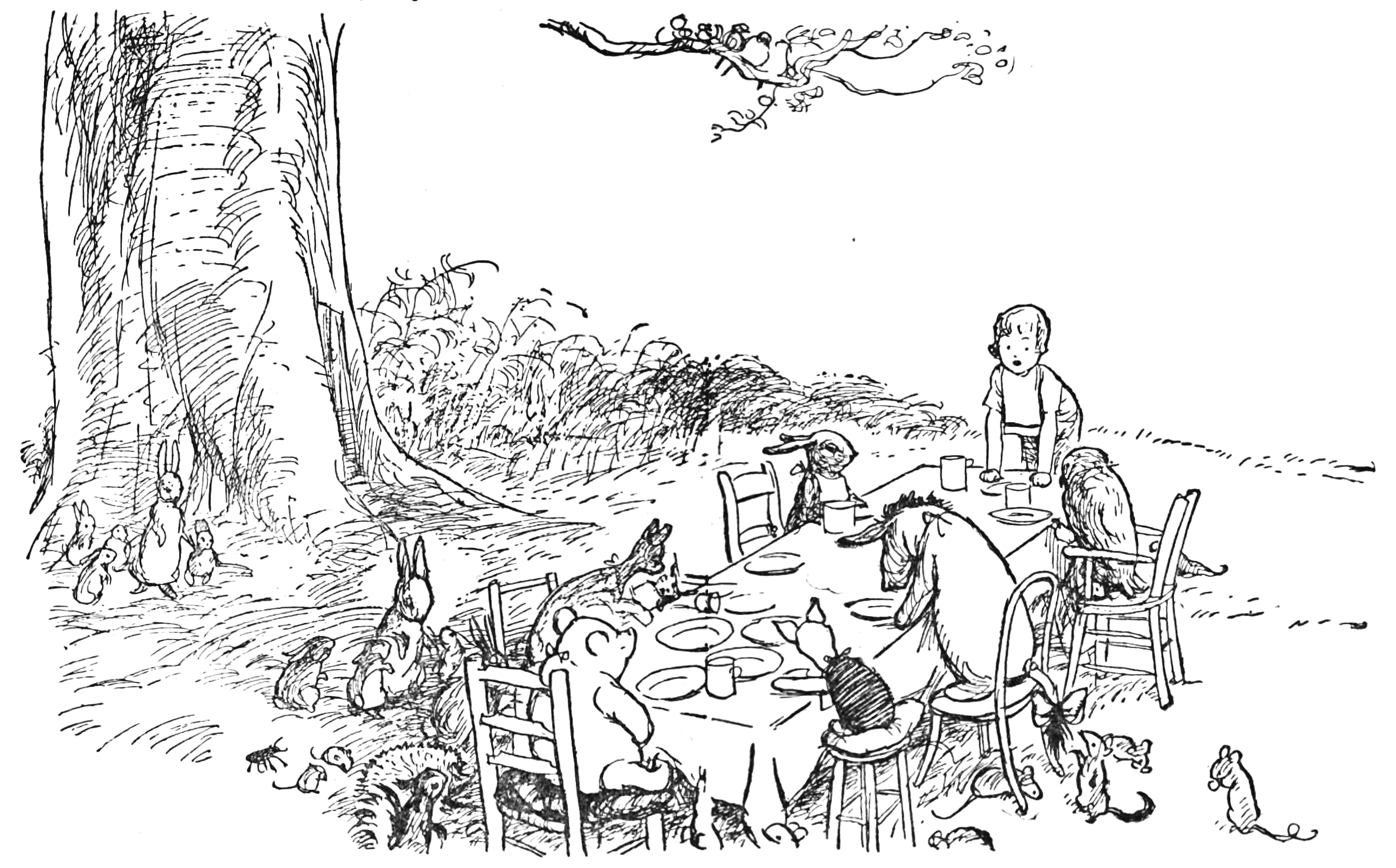
Winnie-the-Pooh and guests

- The book Winnie-the-Pooh by A. A. Milne, and introducing the fictional teddy bear of the same name, was published and released to the public simultaneously in Britain (by Methuen & Company, Ltd.) and in the U.S. by E. P. Dutton.
- The Chicago American Giants, pennant winners of the Negro National League, won the deciding game of the Colored World Series, defeating the Bacharach Giants of Atlantic City, New Jersey, 1 to 0, at Schorling Park in Chicago.
- In the United Kingdom, H. H. Asquith resigned as leader of the Liberal Party. He was replaced by former Prime Minister David Lloyd George.
- James "Killer" Cunniffe and seven accomplices used submachine guns to hijack a United States mail truck in Elizabeth, New Jersey, killing the truck driver and escaping with $161,000 in cash and securities, equivalent to more than three million dollars almost 100 years later. Cunniffe would be killed in a gunbattle with one of his fellow robbers, 17 days later.
- The F. W. Murnau film Faust had its German premiere at the Ufa-Palast am Zoo in Berlin.

== October 15, 1926 (Friday) ==
- A riot injured 12 police and 35 miners at a mine site near Port Talbot in Wales when 500 locked-out miners attacked a colliery that was operating under police protection.
- The International Congress of Expert Surveyors convened in Geneva to standardize surveying techniques around the world.
- Born:
  - Michel Foucault, French philosopher; in Poitiers (d. 1984)
  - Karl Richter, German conductor; in Plauen (d. 1981)
  - Jean Peters, American film actress; in East Canton, Ohio (d. 2000)

== October 16, 1926 (Saturday) ==
- An explosion of ammunition killed at least 1,200 people on the Chinese troopship Kuang Yuang near Jiujiang. The ship had been on its way to Jiangxi Province to fight in battle, and had been carrying 1,500 soldiers under the command of the warlord Sun Chuanfang, along with a cargo of munitions, and caught fire while in port. Many of those who survived the blast died in the fire, or drowned after jumping from the ship. Others on the coast were killed in the city of Jiujiang when they were struck by debris from the exploding ship.
- Rebelling against the rule of the warlord Sun Chuanfang in eastern China, provincial governor Xia Chao declared the independence of the Zhejiang province from the rest of China and began an alliance with the Kuomintang ruled by Chiang Kai-shek.
- The Sherlock Holmes short story "The Adventure of the Blanched Soldier" by Sir Arthur Conan Doyle was published for the first time in Liberty magazine in the United States. The story was unusual in that it was narrated by Holmes himself rather than by Dr. Watson.
- Born:
  - Charles Dolan, American businessman and billionaire known for founding Cablevision and HBO; in Cleveland (d. 2024)
  - Barbara Sinatra, American socialite and the last wife of singer Frank Sinatra; as Barbara Ann Blakeley in Bosworth, Missouri (d. 2017)

== October 17, 1926 (Sunday) ==
- Pope Pius XI beatified the 191 Catholic martyrs of the September Massacres during the French Revolution. Of the group, who all were killed by a mob on September 2 and 3, 1792, while imprisoned at the Saint-Joseph-des-Carmes convent. Of the group, one of the blessed, Saint Solomon Leclercq, would be canonized 90 years later in 2016 by Pope Francis.
- The "Down-with-Imperialism Union" (타도제국주의동맹 Tado Jegugjuui Dongmaeng, literally "Alliance to Overthrow Imperialism) was founded by Korean independence activist Ri Jong Rak as a Marxist-Leninist organization to liberate the former Korea from occupation and control by the Japanese Empire. In North Korea accounts, the Union was founded by future North Korean ruler Kim Il Sung, although he was only 14 years old at the time, the organization is identified as the root of the ruling Workers' Party of Korea, and the anniversary of its founding is celebrated every year.
- Born:
  - Pierre Castel, French beverage production magnate and billionaire known for founding the Castel Group; in Berson, Gironde département (alive in 2026)
  - Fritz Vollmar, Swiss humanitarian and conservationist known for being the first Secretary General of the World Wildlife Fund after its founding in 1961; in Lenzburg, canton of Aargau (d. 2026)
  - Beverly Garland, American television and film actress known as the star of the 1957 crime drama Decoy and as the wife and stepmother in the sitcom My Three Sons from 1969 to 1972; in Santa Cruz, California (d. 2008)
  - Karl Gordon Henize, American astronomer and astronaut on the Spacelab-2 in 1985; in Cincinnati (died from pulmonary edema and altitude sickness, 1993)
  - Julie Adams, American actress; in Waterloo, Iowa (d. 2019)
- Died:
  - Harry H. Bassett, 52, American businessman and president of the Buick Motor Car Company since 1920, died from bronchial pneumonia after traveling to Paris to attend the Paris Auto Show.

== October 18, 1926 (Monday) ==
- Voters in a referendum in Norway overwhelmingly elected to end the prohibition of the sale of alcohol, which had been in place since 1917. On the question of whether to extend the prohibition, more than 55% voted "no" and less than 45% favored continuing.

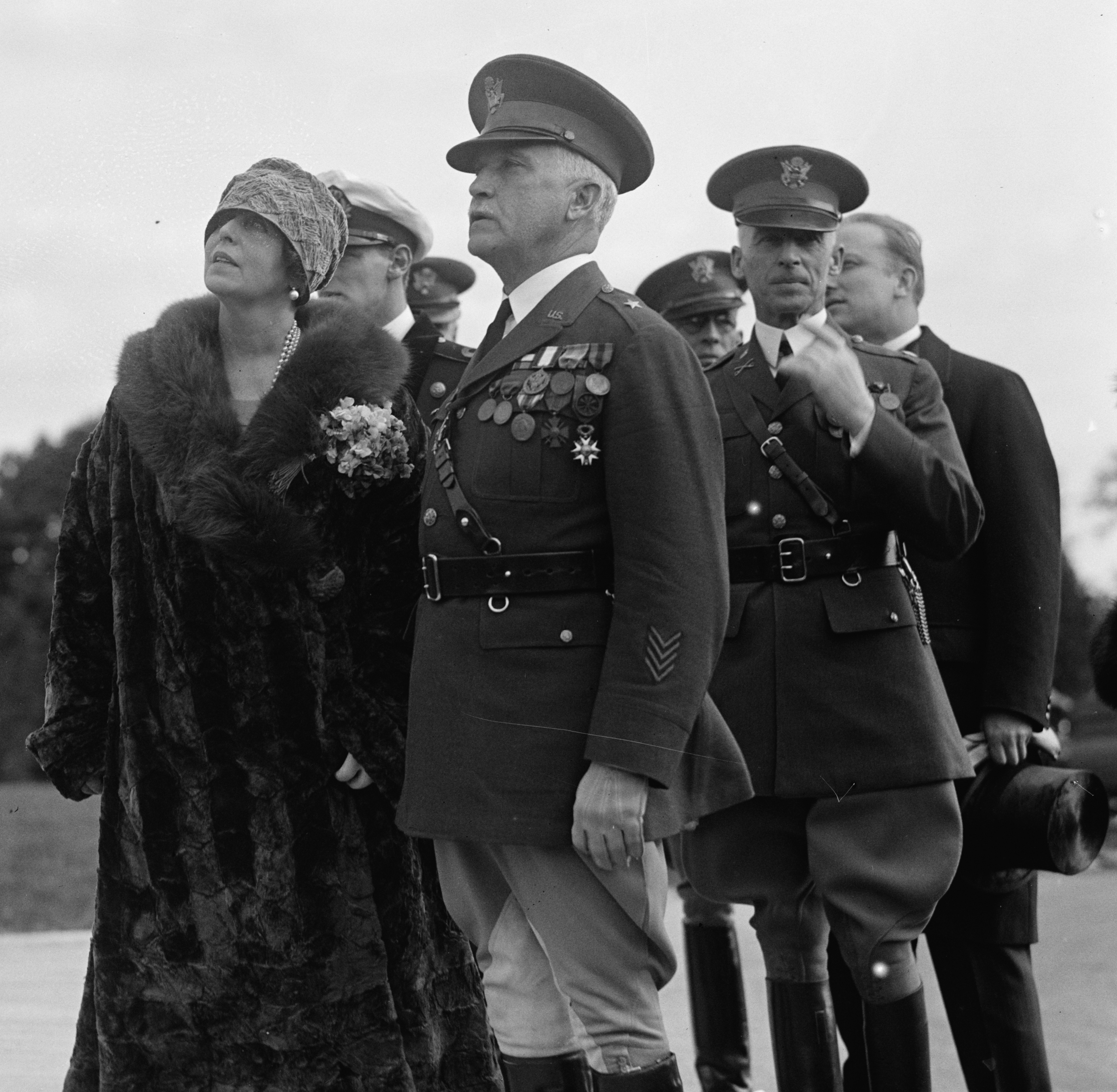
Queen Marie welcomed by U.S. Army General Summerall

- Queen Marie of Romania arrived in New York on the SS Leviathan on the first day of her visit to the United States and Canada. She was welcomed with a ticker tape parade attended by thousands.
- The Frederick Lonsdale play On Approval premiered on Broadway for the first of 96 performances, and later opened at London.
- Born:
  - Chuck Berry, pioneering American rock and roll musician; in St. Louis (d. 2017)
  - Klaus Kinski, German film actor known for Aguirre, the Wrath of God (1972) and Nosferatu the Vampyre (1979); as Klaus Naksynski in Zoppot, Free City of Danzig (now Sopot in Poland) (d. 1991)
  - Yoram Gross, Polish-born Australian filmmaker known for Blinky Bill: The Mischievous Koala (1992); in Kraków (d. 2015)
  - Mateo Manaure, Venezuelan modern artist; in Uracoa, Monagas state (d. 2018)
- Died:
  - James Carroll, 69, New Zealand politician

== October 19, 1926 (Tuesday) ==
- The 1926 Imperial Conference, the ninth since being established in 1887, opened in London as the King-Emperor George V welcomed with the prime ministers of seven dominions of the British Empire (Stanley Baldwin of the UK, Stanley Bruce of Australia, William Lyon Mackenzie King of Canada, W. T. Cosgrave of the Irish Free State, Walter Stanley Monroe of Newfoundland, Gordon Coates of New Zealand and J. B. M. Hertzog of South Africa) and the Earl of Birkenhead, Secretary of State for India.
- The World War One memorial tablet for all British Empire casualties of the Great War was unveiled at Westminster Abbey with the inscription (in English and French) "To the Glory of God and to the Memory of One Million Dead of the British Empire Who Fell in the Great War 1914-1918 and of Whom the Greater Part Rest in France. They Died in Every Quarter of the Earth and on All Its Seas and Their Graves Are Made Sure to Them by Their Kin. The Main Host Lie Buried in the Lands of Our Allies of the War Who Have Set Aside Their Resting Places in Honour For Ever." There ceremony was attended by all of the Prime Ministers of the Empire's Dominions.
- Queen Marie of Romania formally dined at the White House with U.S. President Calvin Coolidge and First Lady Grace Coolidge.
- Born:
  - Jean Ginsburg, English physician and fertility treatment specialist who developed the first ovulation induction program as a fertility treatment; in London (d. 2004)
- Died:
  - Victor Babes, 72, Romanian bacteriologist and one of the founders of microbiology, known for identifying more than 50 previously-unknown germs; Babes-Negri bodies, identified in rabies infected nervous cells, are named in his honor

== October 20, 1926 (Wednesday) ==
- American architect Frank Lloyd Wright was arrested at a cottage at Wildhurst, Minnesota at Lake Minnetonka, where he had been staying with a Montenegrin woman, Olga Lazović, and the daughter they had borne together. Both Wright and Lazović were married to other people. Wright was transported by county sheriff's deputies to married, was then lodged in the Hennepin County Jail on suspicion of adultery. The couple was charged under Minnesota law with the crime of adultery, as well as a federal court violation of the Mann Act.
- More than 650 people were killed by a hurricane that hit Cuba.
- Ignaz Seipel replaced Rudolf Ramek as Chancellor of Austria.
- Born:
  - Dr. Morton Birnbaum, American lawyer and physician who fought for the right to appropriate medical treatment for mentally ill people involuntarily confined to institutions and, if treatment was not provided, for their release; in Brooklyn, New York City (d. 2005)
  - Vsevolod Murakhovsky, Ukrainian and Soviet politician who served as Deputy Premier of the Soviet Union, second to Nikolai Ryzhkov, from 1985 to 1989; in Golubovskiy Rudnik, Ukrainian SSR, Soviet Union (now Kirovsk in Ukraine) (d. 2017)
  - Vladimir Tumanov, Russian judge and chief justice of the Constitutional Court of Russia 1995 to 1997; in Kropotkin, Krasnodar Krai, Russian SFSR, Soviet Union (d. 2011)
- Died:
  - Eugene V. Debs, 70, American Socialist labor and political leader and 1912 presidential candidate for the Socialist Party

== October 21, 1926 (Thursday) ==
- Luigi Federzoni, Italy's Minister of the Interior, issued an order forbidding actors on stage from making jokes about the Italian army.
- In what is now Saudi Arabia, the Emirate of Asir (now the Jazan Province) entered into the Treaty of Makkah with the Kingdom of Hejaz and Nejd. Under the treaty, the Emir Ali bin Muhammad al-Idrisi agreed to allow Asir to come under the mandate of King Ibn Saud, in return for the continued independence of Asir in domestic affairs. In 1930, after the termination of the treaty by Asir, Ibn Saud would successfully order the conquest and annexation of Asir.
- Born:
  - Bob Rosburg, American golfer and 1959 winner of the PGA Championship; in San Francisco (died from accidental fall, 2009)
  - Francisco Kraus Trujillo, Spanish operatic baritone; in Las Palmas, Canary Islands (d. 2016)
  - Leonard Rossiter, English comedian, stage and TV actor known for playing the title role in BBC's The Fall and Rise of Reginald Perrin (1976-1979), and being the star of Rising Damp (1974-1978); in , Wavertree, Liverpool (d. 1984 from heart failure)
  - David Edgar Cartwright, British oceanographer; in Stoke Newington, London (d. 2015)

== October 22, 1926 (Friday) ==
- The foundering of the Royal Navy ship HMS Valerian killed 85 of the 97 crew when the sank in the Bermuda hurricane. The ship was returning to Bermuda after providing hurricane relief in the Bahamas. Another British ship, the freighter Eastway, with the loss of 21 of her 33 crew.
- A 5.7 magnitude earthquake with an epicenter on the border between the Turkish city of Kars and the Soviet Armenian city of Leninakan (now Gyumri), killing at least 360 people
- In a dressing room of the Princess Theater in Montreal, the illusionist and stunt performer Harry Houdini was forcefully punched in the stomach by a McGill University student. Houdin's manager, H. Elliott Struckel, would issue a statement on the day of Houdini's death that Houdini had given a lecture to McGill students and invited students to come to his dressing room for further information. Struckel wrote "On Friday night, two students came to see him, and commented upon his unusual strength. 'You could hardly feel a blow in the stomach, would you, Mr. Houdini?' one of them asked. 'Certainly not,' he replied. Before Mr. Houdini was aware of the boy's intentions and could brace himself, the boy struck two short-arm punches in the pit of the stomach. Mr. Houdini though nothing of it beyond stating that the blows had made him wince," and added "From that time on, Mr. Houdini complained of severe pains in the stomach, something that never before had bothered him. He had never been ill a day in his life before that." However, a physiology professor at McGill told the press "There is no truth in the Detroit report that Houdini was injured in a sparring bout with a McGill student," adding that while "certain members of the faculty and students came up and shook hands with Houdini", the magician did not stand up, adding "His nurse came up to the platform and insisted on Houdini leaving, so gang way was made for him. He got out of the hall quickly and was hurried away in his waiting taxi. There was no opportunity for a sparring match, friendly or otherwise." There is disagreement over whether a punch was the cause of his death from peritonitis from a ruptured appendix on October 31.
- The adultery charges against Frank Lloyd Wright and his partner were dropped and they were released from Hennepin County Jail on $12,500 bail.
- The first novel by Ernest Hemingway, The Sun Also Rises was published by Charles Scribner's Sons , with 5,090 printed copies.
- Born:
  - Arthur Hamilton (pen name for Arthur Hamilton Stern), American songwriter best known for authoring "Cry Me a River" in 1953; in Seattle (d. 2025)
  - Spartak Mishulin, Soviet stage and film actor known for the 1970 film White Sun of the Desert; in Moscow (d. 2005)
- Died:
  - Harry Greb, 32, American boxer and world middleweight champion until being dethroned in a bout with Tiger Flowers on August 19, died from surgical complications after an operation to repair damage to his nose and his respiratory damage.
  - John G. Shedd, 76, American businessman and philanthropist, Chairman of the Board of the Marshall Field & Company department store chain, known for providing the funds for the Shedd Aquarium in Chicago, died from appendicitis.
  - Arthur Cherep-Spiridovich, 60, Russian navy commander and conspiracy theorist known for his book The Secret World Government, or, "The Hidden Hand (1926) alleging that the world was secretly governed by a group of 300 individuals of "Judeo-Mongol" ancestry. Chrep-Spiridovich, living in poverty, was found dead in his room at the Barret Manor transient hotel line on New York's Staten Island, after being asphyxiated by a gas line. His death was ruled to be a suicide.

== October 23, 1926 (Saturday) ==
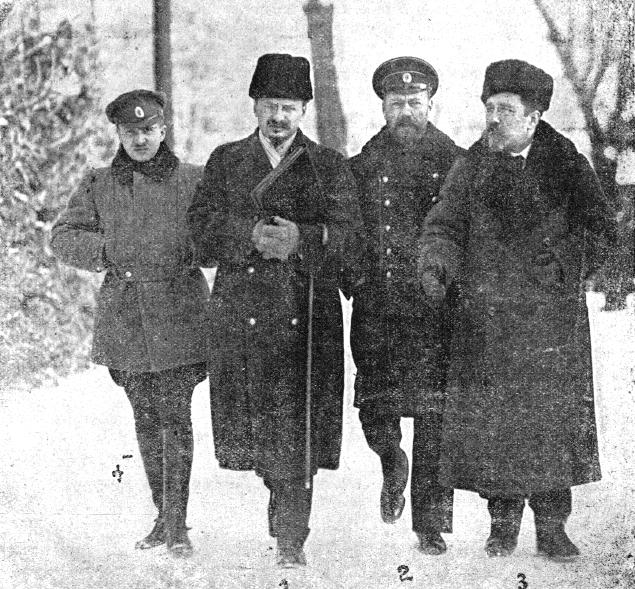
Trotsky and Kamenev (2nd and 4th from the left

- Leon Trotsky and Lev Kamenev were removed from the Politburo of the Central Committee of the Communist Party of the Soviet Union.
- Judge Webster Thayer denied the motion for a new trial in the Sacco and Vanzetti murder case, saying the evidence was not sufficient.
- Died:
  - Olympia Brown, 91, American Christian minister and suffragist known for being the first woman in the United States to be ordained as a member of the clergy of her church with the consent of her denomination. In 1863, Ms. Brown, who had earlier become the first woman to graduate from an established theological school, was ordained by the Universalist Church with the approval of the denomination's governing council.

== October 24, 1926 (Sunday) ==
- The radio program The Standard Hour, sponsored by Standard Oil Company of California (now the Chevron Corporation, was first broadcast, with a live performance by the San Francisco Symphony orchestra, conducted by Alfred Hertz on stations of the NBC Pacific Network. In return for the use of its name for the program, Standard Oil donated almost $10,000 to meet the $25,000 required to save the San Francisco orchestra from bankruptcy, after almost 5,000 contributors had donated $15,226. As one newspaper noted, "but for the aid of Standard Oil Company of California the project would have been abandoned and the money returned." At 2:45 in the afternoon, the program started simultaneously on NBC affiliates KPO and KGO (San Francisco), and KFI (Los Angeles).
- Cork GAA won the championship of hurling in Ireland, defeating Kilkenny GAA, 4-6 to 2-0 (equivalent to 18 to 6, at Croke Park in Dublin in front of 26,829 spectators.
- While in pain since a punch in his abdomen two days earlier, Harry Houdini gave his final performance, appearing at the Garrick Theatre in Detroit. He appeared at the Garrick Theatre for his first visit to Detroit, with a two-week engagement planned, with tickets ranging from 50 cents to $2.00. The press release noted that "He gives a full evening's entertainment, divided into three parts, with "sleight-of-hand and fanciful illusions", followed by "escaping from trunks, boxes, and the Chinese water torture cell", and closing with "an expose of fraudulent mediums, demonstrating the tricks of the trade. With a fever of 104 °F (40 °C), he completed his performance, collapsed in his dressing room, and was taken to the hospital.
- Born:
  - Rafael Azcona, Spanish screenwriter and novelist, known for the film Belle Époque; in Logroño (d. 2008)

== October 25, 1926 (Monday) ==
- Guglielmo Marconi's new Beam Wireless Service, high-speed transmission of telegraph messages via the shortwave radio band, went into operation between Canada and the United States, as part of a contract for improvement of communication through the British Empire's Imperial Wireless Chain. Beam Wireless Services would go into service in 1927 between the UK and Australia, South Africa and India.
- The U.S. Supreme Court decided Myers v. United States, upholding the President's authority to remove executive appointees without the approval of the Senate.
- The government of Belgium's Prime Minister Joseph Bech devalued the Belgian franc, putting the Belgium–Luxembourg Economic Union at risk, in that the value of the franc of Luxembourg was tied to that of Belgium. The rate was stabilized at the rate of 174.31 Belgian francs to the British pound sterling (at the time equivalent to 35 Belgian francs to the U.S. dollar).
- Born:
  - Galina Vishnevskaya, Soviet Russian opera soprano and Soviet dissident; in Leningrad (d. 2012)

== October 26, 1926 (Tuesday) ==
- The tour of Queen Marie of Romania entered Canada with visits to Niagara Falls and Hamilton, Ontario.
- British Labour Party MP Alfred Salter was censured in the House of Commons for refusing to retract his remarks (about the alleged intoxication of fellow MPSs) that had appeared in London's Daily Express. "I am not prepared to withdraw, modify or apologise for anything I have said on this matter, and I propose to repeat the words I made use of and about which complaint has been made", Salter declared. "I said, and I repeat it here to-day, that I have seen members of all parties in this House, my own party I regret to say included, drunk in this House not on one occasion but on many." A motion was passed calling the statement "a gross libel on the Members of this House and a grave breach of its privileges."
- The New York Times and other newspapers printed a report that "the Belgian freigter Caldeonier, which left Bordeaux on Oct. 12 bound for Hampton Roads, Va., blew up off the coast of Portugal several days ago" and that 39 of the 43 people on board were "said to have escaped." A cabled report the next day was sent to the press by the Caldeonier operator, Lloyd Royal Belge, that the 5,074 ton freighter had actually run aground in a river channel below Bordeaux and that there were no casualties.
- Born:
  - Kommuri Sambasiva Rao, Indian Telugu language novelist and author of 90 novels, primarily detective stories; in Tenali, Madras Presidency (now the Andhra Pradesh state), British India (d. 1994)

== October 27, 1926 (Wednesday) ==
- In a speech made before the American Association of Advertising Agencies and broadcast on the radio, U.S. President Calvin Coolidge said that American prosperity was the result of "our high rate of wages which brings about the greatest distribution of wealth that the world has ever seen and provides the enormous capacity for the consumption of all kinds of commodities which characterizes our country." He also said that while wages were high, "that means that the results of prosperity are going more and more into the homes of the land and less into the enrichment of the few, more and more to the men and women and less and less to the capital which is engaged in our economic life. If this were not so the country would not support 20 million automobiles, purchase so many radios, and install so many telephones."
- Born:
  - H. R. Haldeman, American politician and White House Chief of Staff for U.S. President Richard Nixon from 1969 until his resignation in 1973 during the Watergate scandal, later the bestselling author of The Ends of Power; in Los Angeles (d. 1993)
  - Roy W. Menninger, American psychiatrist and businessman, CEO of the Menninger Foundation from 1967 to 1993; in Topeka, Kansas (d. 2024)
  - Tewfik Saleh, Egyptian film director; in Alexandria (d. 2013)
  - Henri Fertet, French resistance fighter executed at the age of 16 for membership in the Francs-Tireurs et Partisans anti-Nazi resistance group in France (d. 1943)

== October 28, 1926 (Thursday) ==
- Pope Pius XI carried out the consecration of six Chinese bishops (Philippus Zhao Huaiyi, Odoric Cheng Hede, Simon Zhu Kaimin, Joseph Hu Ruoshan, Melchior Sun Dezhen, and Aloysius Chen Guodi) in Rome, marking the first time since the 17th century that Chinese Roman Catholics had been elevated to the bishopric by the Vatican.
- The Ganale Doria dam was inaugurated in Africa in Italian Somaliland (now the Republic of Somalia) near the city of Genale on the Shabelle river, only nine months after construction had started, and reportedly with no major incidents nor loss of life.
- The sport of team handball, created in 1917 in Germany, was introduced in the United States in a game in Brooklyn, New York between Turnverein (TV) Union City (of Union City, New Jersey) and the First German Sport Club (Brooklyn). The teams played to a 9 to 9 draw.
- Born:
  - Bowie Kuhn, American lawyer and sports administrator who served as Commissioner of Baseball from 1969 to 1984, named Sportsman of the Year in 1983 by The Sporting News and posthumously inducted to the Baseball Hall of Fame; in Takoma Park, Maryland (d. 2007)
  - Lachmipersad Frederik "Fred" Ramdat Misier, President of Suriname from 1982 to 1988; in Paramaribo, Dutch Guiana (d. 2004)
  - Charles Coleman, American electronics engineer and inventor, pioneer in digital video and audio tape recording; in Washington D.C. (d. 2005)
  - U.S. Air Force Reserve Lt. Milo Radulovich, expelled from the U.S. Air Force in 1953 for maintaining a relationship with his father and his sister during the McCarthy era, and reinstated after his case was publicized by CBS journalist Edward R. Murrow on the program See It Now; in Detroit (d. 2007)
- Died:
  - William Hussey, 64, American astronomer responsible for the building of numerous observatories and the acquisition of state-of-the-art telescopes, died in London while preparing to travel to South Africa.

== October 29, 1926 (Friday) ==
- A contract was signed between Prussia and the deposed House of Hohenzollern, settling the estates of Wilhelm II. 20 of the 60 formerly royal castles were deemed to be family property, and 32 million marks and 24,000 Dutch guilders were also paid out.
- Born:
  - Necmettin Erbakan, Prime Minister of Turkey from 1996 to 1997; in Sinop (d. 2011)
  - Jon Vickers, Canadian operatic tenor, in Prince Albert, Saskatchewan (d. 2015)
  - Claire Vellut, Belgian-born social worker who founded the Damien Foundation India Trust for the treatment and rehabilitation of patients in India who had been diagnosed with leprosy or tuberculosis; in Antwerp (d. 2013)

== October 30, 1926 (Saturday) ==
- Nicaraguan President Emiliano Chamorro resigned and transferred the presidency and its powers to Senator Sebastián Uriza to serve as a transitional leader until a new government could be elected.
- The first issue of the Swedish children's magazine Lyckoslanten (Swedish for "Lucky Penny") appeared on newsstands, originally as a production of the nation's savings bank association, Sparbankerra. In its 100th year as of 2026, Lyckoslanten continues to be published on a quarterly basis.
- The University of Illinois began its tradition of having a student portray the fictional "Chief Illiniwek" at sporting events as the "Fighting Illini" football team's unofficial mascot. The appearances of Chief Illinwek would continue for more than 80 years, until February 21, 2007, when the NCAA banned stereotypes of Native American Indians from the universities under its jurisdiction.
- Born:
  - Lois Wyse, American advertising executive and author of 60 non-fiction books; in Cleveland (d. 2007)
  - Georg Ewald, East German Minister of Agriculture from 1963 until his death; in Buchholz (d. in a car accident, 1973)

== October 31, 1926 (Sunday) ==
- The Feast of Christ the King, a new Catholic holy day, was first observed.
- Benito Mussolini survived the fourth attempt on his life in twelve months when 15-year-old anarchist Anteo Zamboni shot at him in Bologna, and his shot pierced the Italian premier's coat and "cut in two the sash of the Order of St. Lazarus which he was wearing," but failed to strike his body. Police stood by and allowed a vengeful mob of Fascists to lynch Zamboni on the spot.
- After the attempt on Mussolini's life, his cabinet applied Law Number 2307 to close all opposition newspapers, including Avanti!, Il Mondo and L'Ora.
- Born:
  - Amirouche Aït Hamouda, Algerian independence leader who organized the Wilaya II paramilitary unit during the Algerian War with France; in Tassaft Ouguemoun, French Algeria (killed in combat, 1959)
  - Sir Jimmy Savile, English DJ and television personality, known for hosting Top of the Pops on BBC; in Leeds (d. 2011)
  - Noeleen Scott, New Zealand lawn bowls world champion with three gold medals in the 1973 world outdoor championship; in Dunedin (d. 2023)
- Died:
  - Harry Houdini (stage name for Erich Weiss), 52, Hungarian-born American illusionist and stunt performer, died from peritonitis caused by appendicitis and injuries.
  - Charles Vance Millar, 72, Canadian businessman and lawyer who would become known for the unusual terms of his will that included a provided for the remainder of his estate, after specific bequests and expenses, to be paid to whichever woman in Ontario could give birth to the most children in the 10 years following his death.
  - James Cunniffe, 31, American armed robber who had carried out the theft of $161,000 of cash and securities from a U.S. Mail truck 17 days earlier, was shot and killed by one of his fellow gang members, William Crowley.
  - Anteo Zamboni, 15, Italian anarchist, was killed by a mob after attempting to assassinate Benito Mussolini.
