= Willem Marinus van Rossum =

Dutch prelate

His Eminence Willem Marinus van Rossum C.SS.R.
- Prefect of the Congregation for the Propagation of the Faith
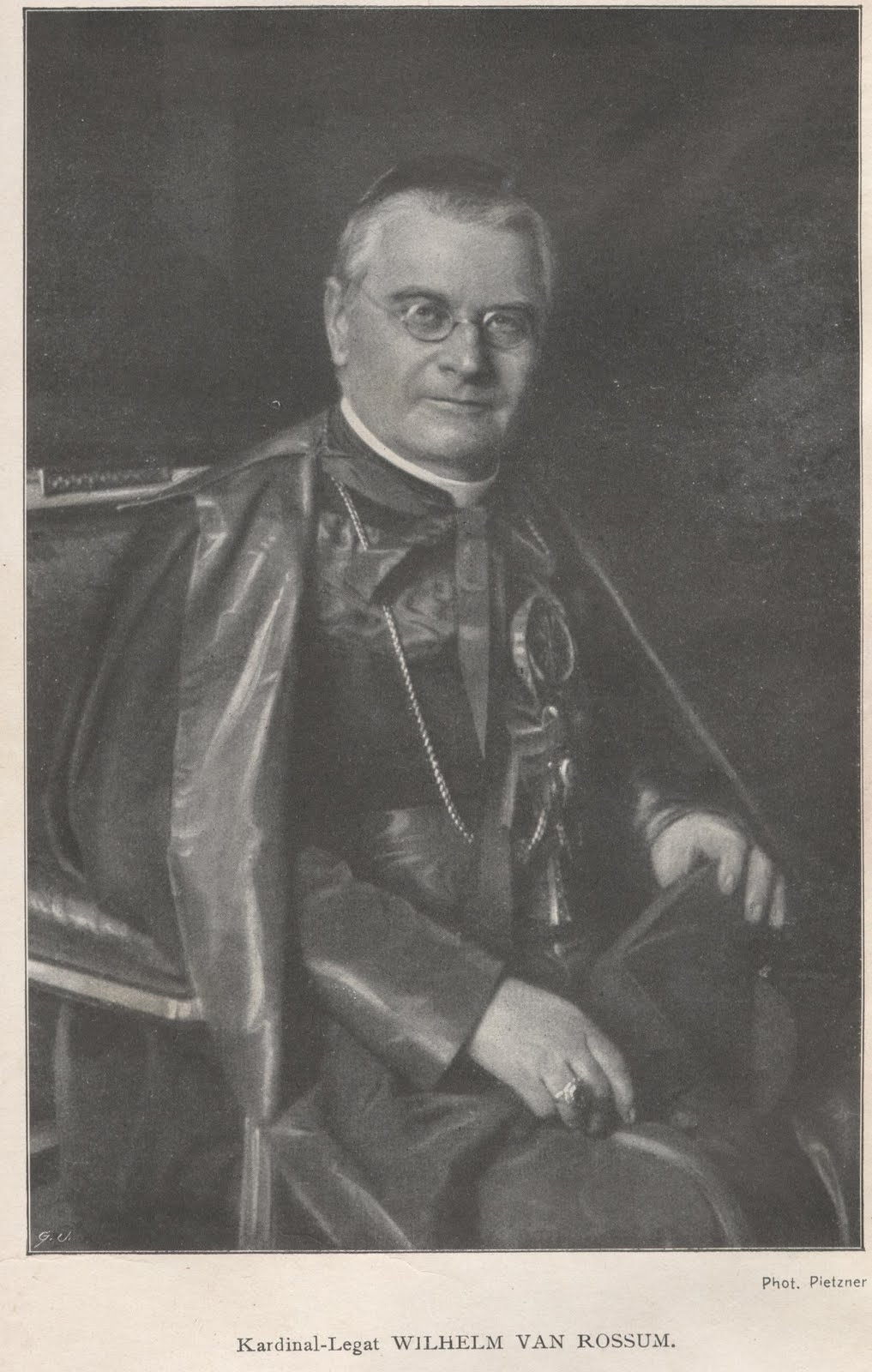
- The cardinal seen in 1920.
- Church: Roman Catholic Church
- Appointed: 12 March 1918
- Term ended: 30 August 1932
- Predecessor: Domenico Serafini
- Successor: Pietro Fumasoni Biondi
- Other posts: President of the Pontifical Commission for Biblical Studies (1914-32); Cardinal-Priest of Santa Croce in Gerusalemme (1915-32); Major Penitentiary of the Apostolic Penitentiary (1915–1918), Prefect of the Congregation for the Propagation of the Faith (1918–1932)
- Previous posts: Cardinal-Deacon of San Cesareo in Palatio (1911-15); Major Penitentiary of the Apostolic Penitentiary (1915-18); Titular Archbishop of Cæsarea (1918)

Orders
- Ordination: 17 October 1879
- Consecration: 19 May 1918 by Pope Benedict XV
- Created cardinal: 27 November 1911 by Pope Pius X
- Rank: Cardinal-Deacon (1911-15); Cardinal-Priest (1915-32)

Personal details
- Born: Willem Marinus van Rossum; 3 September 1854 Zwolle, Overijssel, Netherlands
- Died: 30 August 1932 (aged 77) Maastricht, Limburg, Netherlands
- Parents: Jan van Rossum; Hendrika Veldwillems

Ordination history
History
Priestly ordination
- Date: 17 October 1870
- Place: Wittem, Limburg, Netherlands
Cardinalate
- Elevated by: Pope Pius X
- Date: 1911
Episcopal succession
Bishops consecrated by Willem Marinus van Rossum as principal consecrator
- Pietro Pisani: 21 December 1919
- Mario Giardini: 8 December 1921
- Bernard Gijlswijk: 2 December 1922
- Alexis Lépicier: 29 May 1924
- Edward Mooney: 31 January 1926
- Giovanni Battista della Pietra: 19 March 1927
- Paschal Charles Robinson: 24 May 1927
- Giovanni Battista Dellepiane: 30 November 1929
- Olaf Offerdahl: 6 April 1930
- Carlo Salotti: 6 July 1930
- Leo Peter Kierkels: 26 April 1931

Willem Marinus van Rossum, C.Ss.R. (3 September 1854 – 30 August 1932) was a Dutch prelate of the Roman Catholic Church. He was made a cardinal in 1911, led the Apostolic Penitentiary from 1915 to 1918, and served as Prefect of the Congregation for the Propagation of the Faith from 1918 until his death.

== Life ==
Willem van Rossum was born in Zwolle, Netherlands, to Jan and Hendrika (née Veldwillems) van Rossum. He entered the Minor Seminary of Culemborg in 1867 and joined the Congregation of the Most Holy Redeemer, more commonly known as the Redemptorists, on 15 June 1873. He made his profession as a Redemptorist on 16 June 1874.

He was ordained a priest in Wittem on 17 October 1879. He then taught Latin and rhetoric in Roermond and was a professor of dogmatic theology at the Scholasticate of Wittem from 1883 to 1892. He became the prefect of studies there in 1886 and its rector in 1893.

After becoming a member of the Redemptorist community in Rome in 1895, Rossum was named a consultor to the Congregation of the Holy Office on 25 December 1896. He also became a counselor to the Commission for the Codification of Canon Law on 15 April 1904. He served as general consultor of the Redemptorists from 1909 to 1911.

On 27 November 1911, although Van Rossum was not yet a bishop, Pope Pius X named him Cardinal-Deacon of San Cesareo in Palatio, the first Dutch cardinal. In 1914, he became president of the Pontifical Biblical Commission. He participated in the 1914 papal conclave that elected Pope Benedict XV.

On 1 October 1915, he was named head of the Apostolic Penitentiary. On 6 December 1915, he was also raised to the rank of Cardinal Priest, with the titular church of Santa Croce in Gerusalemme. He was appointed Prefect of the Congregation for the Propagation of the Faith (Propaganda Fide) on 12 March 1918.

As the head of the Propaganda Fide, he dispatched Jean-Baptiste-Marie Budes de Guébriant as an apostolic visitor to China, where de Guébriant was tasked with visiting all major Catholic missions and to investigate the Catholic Church's relative lack of success in China, compared to the growth in Protestantism. Van Rossum was the primary drafter of Maximum Illud, which Benedict XV issued during de Guébriant's visit to China. This encyclical was directed towards the church in China, and instructed the leaders of missions there to put aside the lesser concerns of their national interests and commit to the long-term good of an indigenous Catholic church in China. Van Rossum was an advocate for ordaining local bishops in China, and in 1926, the first six Chinese Catholic Bishops of modern times were consecrated (Simon Zhu Kaimin, Joseph Hu Ruoshan, Aloysius Chen Guodi, Philip Zhao Huaiyi, Odoric Cheng Hede, and Melchior Sun Dezhen).

He participated the 1922 conclave that elected Pope Pius XI. At the latter he was thought a possible compromise candidate.

Van Rossum died on 30 August 1932 in a Maastricht hospital, after falling ill on returning from a visit to Denmark. He was buried in the Witten cemetery, but later in the Redemptorist church in Wittem.

Catholic Church titles
Preceded by Serafino Vannutelli	Major Penitentiary of Apostolic Penitentiary; 1 October 1915 – 12 March 1918	Succeeded by Oreste Giorgi
Preceded by Domenico Serafini	Prefect of the Congregation for the Propagation of the Faith; 12 March 1918 – 30 August 1932	Succeeded by Pietro Fumasoni Biondi
