= Rerum Ecclesiae =

1926 encyclical issued by Pope Pius XI

Rerum Ecclesiae (On Catholic Missions) was an encyclical issued by Pope Pius XI on 28 February 1926. Addressing the situation of the Catholic Church in China, it emphasized the need for foreign missionaries to abandon assumptions of racial inferiority and develop indigenous clergy.

== History ==
In 1919, Pope Benedict XV issued Maximum Ilud, which instructed the leaders of missions to put aside the lesser concerns of their national interests and commit to the long-term good of an indigenous church. It stated:

It would be tragic indeed if any of our missionaries forgot the dignity of their office so completely as to busy themselves with the interests of their terrestrial homeland instead of with those of their homeland in heaven. It would be a tragedy indeed if an apostolic man were to spend himself in attempts to increase and exalt the prestige of the native land he once left behind him. Such behavior would infect his apostolate like a plague.

Pius XI issued Rereum Ecclesiae on 28 February 1926. It adopted and expanded on Benedict XV's instructions in Maximum Ilud.

Addressed to the Catholic Church as a whole, the encyclical was directed to the situation of the Catholic Church in China. On 15 June 1926, Pius XI issued a letter to the heads of Catholic missions in China emphasizing that foreign missionaries were forbidden from favoring the interests of their home countries.

In 1926, six Chinese priests (Joseph Hu Ruoshan, Philippus Zhao Huaiyi, Simon Zhu Kaimin, Odoric Cheng Hede, Melchior Sun De-zhen, and Aloysius Chen Guodi) were consecrated in Rome and became the first Chinese Catholic Bishops in modern times. The Holy See framed these consecrations as an important moment for indigenizing the Catholic Church.

== Content ==
The encyclical began by invoking a vision of missions as designed to "make disciples of all nation" (Matthew 18:19-20).

In its discussion of indigenous clergy, Rereum Ecclesiae explains that any Church that does not produce bishops is incomplete. It stated that the Church wanted local "priests who will be destined one day to govern parishes and dioceses".

Emphasizing its continuity with Benedict XV's Maximum Ilud, the encyclical stated:

You will remember that Pope Benedict XV our predecessor of happy memory, uttered the following regret: "... it is a deplorable fact that, even after the Popes have insisted upon it, there still remain sections of the world that have heard the Faith preached for several centuries, and still have a local clergy that is of inferior quality. It is also true that there are countries that have been deeply penetrated by the light of the Faith, and have, besides, reached a level of civilization that they produce eminent men in all fields of secular life -- and yet, though they have lived under the strengthening influence of the Church and the gospel for hundreds of years, they still cannot produce Bishops for the spiritual government or priests for their spiritual guidance."

The encyclical addressed the need to abandon presumptions of racial inequality, "If anyone considers these locals an inferior race, endowed with only very limited intelligence, they are serious mistaken." It states that indigenous clergy should not be considered second rate, but should be prepared to take the highest positions in their churches:

Certainly you should not allow the native clergy to be looked upon as if they were a lower grade of priests ... On the contrary, you should prefer the native priests to all others, for it is they who will one day govern the churches and Catholic communities founded by your sweat and labor. Therefore, there should exist no discrimination of any kind between priests, be they European missionaries or natives.

== Analysis ==
Missionary and historian Pasquale D'Elia commented when the encyclical issued, "Nothing shall any longer prevent indigenous priests from being placed at the head of parishes and even dioceses to be created as soon as it will please God." The letter helped prepare the way for Chinese clergy to become bishops.

Academic Stephanie M. Wong states, "Written only seven years after Maximum Illud, Rerum Ecclesiae renders a picture of the indigenous church no longer simply on the receiving end of evangelistic energy but rather structured to produce holy people with a dynamism of its own."
