= Frédéric-Vincent Lebbe =

Catholic Missionary

- Traditional Chinese: 雷鳴遠
- Simplified Chinese: 雷鸣远
Transcriptions
Standard Mandarin
- Hanyu Pinyin: Léi Míngyuǎn

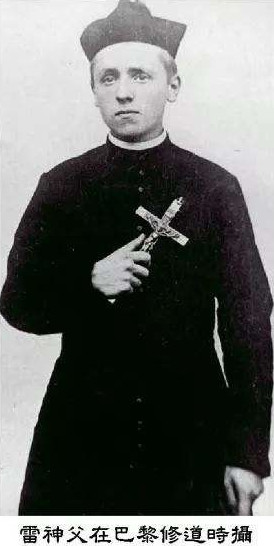
The caption in traditional Chinese reads: "Photographed during Father Lebbe's apostolic life in Paris".

Frédéric-Vincent Lebbe (Chinese name: Lei Mingyuan 雷鳴遠; 19 August 1877 — 24 June 1940) was a Catholic missionary to China whose advocacy contributed to Pope Pius XI's appointment of the first native Chinese bishops of modern times. Born in Belgium, he chose to become a Chinese citizen at a time when missionaries, like all Westerners, enjoyed legal privileges in China, including immunity from Chinese law. Lebbe advocated for the indigenization of the Catholic Church in China.

Lebbe supported China in the Second Sino-Japanese War and served as the Director of the Military Commission North China Battlefront Supervisory Corps. The Corps' support role included rallying peasants against the invading Japanese and intelligence-gathering. Historical perspectives differ regarding whether the Corps engaged in anti-communist intelligence work, whether Corps members included Blue Shirts, and if so, whether Lebbe was aware. He was detained by the Chinese Communists for 55 days in early 1940. He died later that year, likely of exhaustion and undiagnosed pancreatic cancer.

== Life and works ==
Frédéric Lebbe was born on 19 August 1877 in Ghent, Belgium into a devout Catholic family as the first of seven children. His father was a Belgian of Flemish French and Flemish Belgian descent who worked as a lawyer and bookbinder. His mother was English and a convert to Catholicism who sought to develop a sense of Catholic spirituality and justice in the Lebbe children. When Frédéric was 11 years old, he read about the martyrdom of French Catholic missionary Jean-Gabriel Perboyre, a member of the Lazarists, in China in 1840, inspiring him tell his mother he was "going to be a [Lazarist] and go to China to be martyred."

As a teenager, Lebbe attended St. Vincent's boarding school in Ypres as a day student. He spent a phase in ascetic practice in which he drank only water, swam in freezing water during winter, practiced physical mortifications, and tried to recruit other students to engage in similar conduct, until his mother stopped him.

Lebbe took the name "Vincent" at his confirmation in honor of Vincent de Paul. In 1895, in Paris, Lebbe entered the Lazarist order. In October 1900, his superiors sent him to the Lazarists' international house of studies in Rome, anticipating that he would become a professor rather than a missionary, to their concerns for his health.

=== In China ===
Lebbe opposed viewing the Catholic Church's missionary work in China as a civilizing mission. According to Lebbe, "It is still narrow-minded to want everyone to have our civilization, as our present Western civilization is not civilization in itself. It is the one that suits the present people of the West, that's all."

Lebbe arrived in China in 1901, in the wake of the Boxer Rebellion. Lebbe was concerned both by anti-Christian violence during the uprising as well as his belief that foreign missionary practices were at least partly responsible for the backlash. Condemning the executions of Chinese in Baoding by French general Camille Baillaud, Lebbe wrote, "And this is what it means to civilize!!! Our armies leave behind a long trail of blood and filth. They have carried out acts which cause the pagans themselves to cry out in horror, which have made the Christians say: only pagans would act this way."

Lebbe deemed imperialism a sin and an affront to divine justice. He wrote in 1902, "Above all, never be one of those patriotic missionaries, as there are so many who want -- dare I say it -- to plant the flag with the Cross, and often before the Cross, and sometimes without the Cross, and always to the detriment of the Cross."

At a time when many Chinese and Europeans took a pessimistic view of non-Christian/Christian relations, Lebbe believed that the violence of the Boxer Rebellion was not inevitable, but circumstantial and avoidable. Lebbe believed that Chinese culture and traditional ethics were not a barrier to evangelization, contending that "Confucius teaches a natural morality as adaptable to Catholicism as the morality of Aristotle."

His first major assignment was at a seminary where he finished his studies as a seminarian and taught scripture, the history of the Catholic Church, and music. He was troubled that the superior of the seminary emphasized teaching Chinese seminarians to submit to French oversight and that Chinese Catholic seminarians treated their fellow Chinese with disdain. Lebbe was surprised to see the disdain with which Europeans treated Chinese, and developed the belief that France's civil presence in China had conflicts of interest with the Catholic Church's mission there.

He was ordained in Beijing on 28 October 1901. Lebbe was assigned over the next five years to various rural communities that had experienced violence during the Boxer Rebellion, including the villages of Xiaohan, Dasanzhuang, and the larger town of Dingzhou.

Lebbe learned Chinese and wore Chinese clerical dress. He objected to the practice of Chinese Catholics kneeling or prostrating themselves before foreign missionaries and sought to replace it with a practice of genuflecting.

Lebbe promoted a missionary approach he called the Tianjin Method, through which he sought to make Catholicism more active in the public sphere and on issues of national concern in China. He met with Chinese municipal officials, military officials, community intellectual leaders, and community cultural leaders in an effort to develop goodwill and show his respect. His method also emphasized mobilizing Catholic laity through societies like local chapters of the Society for the Propagation of the Faith. Lebbe's command of Chinese allowed him to interact with the Chinese intelligentsia of Tianjin, converting dozens and attracting the attention of many more, especially with lecture hall discussions on religion, ethics, and patriotism.

In 1912, Lebbe established the first Chinese Catholic weekly newspaper, Guang Yi Lu, and appointed Ying Lianzhi as its lay editor.

In 1912, the Apostolic Vicariate of Tianjin was established, and Lebbe was able to achieve spectacular results in his missionary work, being promoted to the position of vicar for the new Vicariate (a position second only to the Vicariate's Bishop).

Lebbe opposed Japan's Twenty-One Demands and spoke publicly against them a member of the Tianjin Patriotic Association.

In 1917, Lebbe founded the Catholic newspaper Yishibao (益世報) in Tianjin, which is considered one of the "Four Great Newspapers of the Republican period" (民国四大报刊).

Along with Anthony Cotta (汤作霖), Lebbe criticized various foreign religious organizations for the practice of controlling Chinese Catholicism to the benefit of their home countries. Lebbe contended that the colonial mentality of foreign missionaries harmed the Church's mission in China. He adopted the slogan, "China to the Chinese, the Chinese to Christ," and advocated for the consecration of Chinese bishops.

In 1916, the Laoxikai affair (老西開事件) occurred in Tianjin. The basis of the struggle was that the French Consul of Tianjin with the support of the Church leadership in Tianjin attempted to expand the French Concession by appropriating land adjacent to St. Joseph's Cathedral and incorporating it into the Concession. Yishibao published many objections to these actions, including one written by Lebbe himself, bringing Lebbe into conflict with Tianjin Bishop Paul-Marie Dumond. As a result of the disagreement, Lebbe was demoted and transferred Ningbo diocese in April 1920, and he soon afterwards returned to Europe. Nonetheless, the protests of Lebbe and Cotta to the Vatican influenced Pope Benedict XV's 1919 apostolic letter Maximum illud, which aimed to indigenize the Church in China and curb the worst abuses of Western missionaries, including actions undertaken in the interest of one's country rather than the Church as a whole.

Reassigned to southern China, Lebbe was unable to speak or understand local dialects well, and struggled.

=== Europe ===
While in Europe, Lebbe assisted Chinese students and engaged in missionary work among them, where he competed for their allegiance with a former leader in the Tianjin Student Union and Yishibao reporter, Zhou Enlai. He also helped establish the Society of Auxiliaries of the Missions and the Women Lay Auxiliaries of the Missions during this time. Lebbe continued to lobby the Vatican to reform the China mission, even meeting with the Pope to make his case, and he was influential in the appointment of the first six Chinese bishops, whose consecration he attended, on 28 October 1926 in St. Peter's Basilica. The six were Zhu Kaimin in Haimen (朱开敏,海门教区), Cheng Hede in Puqi (成和德, 蒲圻教区), Aloysius Chen Guodi in Fenyang (陈国砥,汾阳教区), Philip Zhao Huaiyi in Xuanhua (赵怀义, 宣化教区), Joseph Hu Ruoshan in Taizhou (胡若山, 台州教区), and Melchior Sun Dezhen in Anguo (孙德桢, 安国教区).

=== Return to China ===
In 1927, Lebbe applied for and was granted Chinese citizenship and returned to China in 1928, aiding Bishop Melchior Sun Dezhen in Anguo, Hebei and helping establish two Chinese religious orders, the Little Brothers of St. John the Baptist (Les Petits frères de Saint-Jean-Baptiste, 耀汉小兄弟会) and the Little Sisters of St. Theresa of the Holy Child (Les Petites soeurs de Sainte-Thérèse-de-l'Enfant-Jésus, 德来小姊妹会), the latter named for Saint Thérèse of Lisieux). He relinquished his Belgian citizenship when he naturalized. The Congregation of Saint John the Baptist has been active in Taiwan, Vietnam, the US, the Philippines, Canada, and China.

Lebbe worked to develop the Catholic Action network across China, working especially closely with Paul Yu Bin. Unlike Catholic Action in Europe, which had a more conservative character as it sought to re-evangelize Catholic countries which had anti-clerical movements, Catholic Action in China members in China understood themselves to be evangelizing China for the first time.

Lebbe strongly advocated on behalf of the Chinese people against Japanese imperialism. Lebbe was frustrated with Chiang Kai-shek's policy of appeasement and negotiation with Japan, deeming the Japanese occupation as a moral issue which could not be ignored.

During the Battle of Rehe in 1933, Lebbe led his congregation to rescue and treat wounded soldiers.

Lebbe's work organizing stretcher bearers in support of the Nationalist Army created tensions with his Lazarist superiors. As a result, he left the order on 4 July 1933. On Christmas of that year, he joined the Little Brothers and was made the order's first Superior.

After the Second Sino-Japanese War broke out in 1937, Lebbe organized and led a Catholic battlefield rescue and relief team which aided wounded soldiers at Taihangshan (太行山) and Zhongtiaoshan (中条山), and led refugee relief efforts, including providing education for students whose schools had been closed by the fighting.

Lebbe set the expectation for the Little Brothers and the Little Sisters that they should give everything in their ministries to support the national war effort against the Japanese and local Chinese villages, deeming this the spirit of "true charity".

Lebbe wrote that in opposing Japan's invasion, "Even more than for the European war, the justice of our case is so clear and simple that all hearts are united in the thought that we are fighting for the Good (God) against Evil (demon), and we are all determined to fight until the last drop of blood and the last handful of Chinese soil."

During the winter of 1937-1938, Lebbe had disagreements with others in church leadership over what role church leaders in China and Japan should have in the war. Lebbe had encountered foreign missionaries who were sympathetic or neutral towards Japan, or who encouraged lay Chinese Catholics not to defend China. Lebbe also believed that various Italian bishops in areas of China occupied by the Japanese were collaborating.

=== Director of the Military Commission North China Battlefront Supervisory Corps ===
Lebbe was the director of the Military Commission North China Battlefront Supervisory Corps, the purpose of which was to rally north Chinese peasants against the Japanese and collect intelligence on Japan. During its last two years, the Corps was a New Life Movement organization under the jurisdiction of the Military Commission.

Historical analyses of Lebbe's work as director of the Corps differ. Subjects of historical debate on his work with the Corps include (1) whether Lebbe's intelligence gathering for the Nationalists included gathering intelligence on the communists, (2) whether the Nationalists place anti-Communist Blue Shirts into the organization, and (3) if so, whether Lebbe knew the organization contained Blue Shirts.

Some historians contend that Lebbe knowingly engaged in intelligence work against the communists and that when he was detained in March 1940 by the communists, he was in the midst of such work. Academic Miles Yu goes further, contending that Lebbe was a part of Dai Li's intelligence network since October 1938, although academic Ernest Young contends that Yu's factual errors regarding Lebbe's 1940 detention by the communists and thin sourcing undermines Yu's argument. Regardless, Dai Li sought to use the Corps for both anti-Japanese and anti-Communist intelligence gathering. Academic Stephanie M. Wong writes that analyses focused on Lebbe's anti-communism are complicated by the fact that Lebbe had positive relations with communist generals in the months before his detention.

Jacques Leclercq contended that Dai Li had placed undercover Blue Shirts in the organization to conduct anti-communist activities, but that Lebbe was not aware. According to Leclercq, "The Communists knew this, but [Fr.] Lebbe did not, and probably the Communists did not know that [Fr.] Lebbe did not." A missionary who worked with some of the stretcher-bearers in the Service Corps wrote an account to Lebbe's brother in 1946, which asserted that Chiang Kai-shek had placed Blue Shirts in the Corps without Lebbe's knowledge. Academic Stephanie M. Wong writes that if there were Blue Shirts in the corps, it would be reasonable to think Lebbe did not know, because "the Blue Shirts were a secret fascist society within the Whampoa clique to which even the wider Nationalist party did not have access. The group's hallmark was maintaining so rigorous an anonymity that even government officers could not be certain of Blue Shirt membership."

=== Detention ===
In early 1940, Lebbe had completed a propaganda tour in the Jinjiyu Anti-Japanese Base Area in northern Henan. The Second United Front between the Nationalists and the Communists was weakening. Lebbe was ill, experiencing jaundice, had a hydrocele, and had organ failure which had not yet been diagnosed.

Fighting between the Nationalists and Communists prompted Lebbe and his group to go to a village which was under the protection of Nationalist General Sun Dianying. During this time, a group of Communists detained him, believing him to have conducted anti-communist propaganda.

The Communists detained Lebbe for 55 days. During his detention, Lebbe offered Masses, lead prayers, preached to other Christian prisoners, and baptized some prisoners. Being detained, he was unable to obtain treatment for his medical problems. Chiang Kai-shek intervened, informing General Zhu De that Chiang would order an attack on Liu Bocheng's division if it did not release Lebbe. The Communists released Lebbe and the other detained Little Brothers, escorting them to the edge of Communist territory.

=== Death ===
Lebbe and the others traveled to Luoyang, arriving there three weeks later. Lebbe received medical care at a military hospital there for three weeks and his condition worsened. Chiang sent a private plane for Lebbe, which took him to Chongqing. In Chongqing, Lebbe also received traditional Chinese medicine. He died on 24 June 1940, likely of exhaustion and pancreatic cancer.

Lebbe's coffin was accompanied by Chiang and General Yu Hanmou. The Nationalist government flew flags at half-staff nationwide in recognition of Lebbe and published a decree praising Lebbe for "work[ing] for the country with unflagging vigor to the end" and stating that "the whole Chinese people respects him."

Lebbe was buried on Gele Mountain outside of Chongqing.

== Legacy ==
Lebbe's burial site is accessible as part of what it now Geleshan National Forest Park. It bears a cross, photograph of Lebbe, and the inscription, "He gave his utmost for China." As academic Stephanie M. Wong writes, Lebbe "spent most of his adult life resisting foreign ecclesiastical dominance in China. He looked to Rome as a transnational authority in global Catholicism but was a thoroughgoing Chinese nationalist who also thought the Church must demonstrate its commitment to the geopolitical autonomy of 'New China'."

The Vincent Lebbe Archives are maintained at the Faculté de théologie at the l'Université Catholique de Louvain in Louvain, Belgium.

The case for Lebbe's beatification was opened in 1988 by the Little Brothers of St. John the Baptist of Taichung, Taiwan. Many schools and institutions bear his name, and he received official praise from the ROC government after his death, including a memorial tablet at the National Revolutionary Martyrs' Shrine in Taipei.

== Writings ==
- Oeuvres de Vincent Lebbe
- Memoria sullo stato dell'evangelizzazione in Cina e sulla formazione del Clero indigeno, Sagra Congregazione De Propaganda Fide, Ponente, Rome 1922.
- Que sera la Chine demain?, 1925
- En Chine, il y a du nouveau, Paris 1930
- Histoires chinoises, Louvain 1937
