= Evangelii praecones =

1951 papal encyclical by Pius XII

Evangelii praecones Encyclical of Pope Pius XII
- Signature date: 2 June 1951
- Number: 20 of the pontificate

Evangelii praecones (June 2, 1951) was an encyclical letter of Pope Pius XII about Catholic missions. In it, he described necessary improvements and changes, and the persecution of the Church in some parts of the world. The encyclical was issued in commemoration of the 25th anniversary of the encyclical Rerum ecclesiae by his predecessor Pope Pius XI.

It is sometimes identified as the first of five papal encyclicals issued between 1919 and 1959 that redefined the Church’s missionary role.

== Progress made ==
In the letter, Pius XII wrote that despite war and much political turbulence, the last 25 years were blessed with success. He also states that the number of Catholic missions increased 50%, from 400 to 600; the faithful increased from 15 to almost 21 million people, the number of native and foreign priests increased from 14,800 to 26,800. The letter further states that twenty-five years ago, all bishops were foreign born and by 1951, 88 bishops were nationals of their country. For instance, in Pakistan and in some parts of Africa the Ecclesiastical Hierarchy was established; three Plenary Councils were held, in Indochina (1934), Australia (1937) and India (1950). Minor seminaries have been greatly increased and strengthened. The number of those studying in major seminaries, which 25 years ago was only 1,770 was now 4,300; moreover, many regional seminaries have been built.

== Future Perspectives ==
The Church never saw missions as an end in themselves. Like Maximum illud (1919) of Benedict XV, and Rerum Ecclesiae (1926) of Pius XI, Pope Pius XII in 1944 saw the end of missionary work as the very measure of success "The magnanimous and noble purpose which missionaries have is the propagation of the faith in new lands in such a way that the Church may ever become more firmly established in them and as soon as possible reach such a stage of development that it can continue to exist and flourish without the aid of missionary organizations. These missionary organizations do not serve their own ends, but it is their task to use every endeavour to realize the lofty purpose We have already mentioned. When that has been attained, then let them be happy to turn to other fields." Thus, missionary success can be measured by a downsizing of traditional missionary activities and upgrading of local hierarchies.

== Persecution ==
Pope Pius XII replied to attacks and persecutions in China with the following words:

In our own time there are countries in the Far East, which are being purpled with martyrs' blood. We have learned that many of the faithful and also nuns, missionaries, native priests and even Bishops have been driven from their homes, despoiled of their possessions and languish in want as exiles or have been arrested, thrown into prison or into concentration camps, or sometimes cruelly done to death, because they were devoutly attached to their faith.

Our heart is overwhelmed with grief when We think of the hardships, suffering and death of these our beloved children. Not only do We love them with a fatherly love, but We reverence them with a fatherly veneration, since We are fully aware that their high sense of duty is sometimes crowned with martyrdom. Jesus Christ, the first martyr, said: "If they have persecuted me, they will also persecute you."

== Cultural respect ==
The Pope had one more objective: The introduction of the Gospel does not mean the destruction of local cultures. Not all seem to understand this point. He wrote in Summi Pontificatus that a deeper appreciations into the various civilizations and their good qualities are necessary to the preaching of the Gospel of Christ. And in his 1944 speech to the directors of the Pontifical Missionary Society, he said:

The herald of the Gospel and messenger of Christ is an apostle. His office does not demand that he transplant European civilization and culture, and no other, to foreign soil, there to take root and propagate itself. His task in dealing with these peoples, who sometimes boast of a very old and highly developed culture of their own, is to teach and form them so that they are ready to accept willingly and in a practical manner the principles of Christian life and morality; principles, I might add, that fit into any culture, provided it be good and sound, and which give that culture greater force in safeguarding human dignity and in gaining human happiness.

— Evangelii 60

The Pope concluded his message by thanking the clergy and all the faithful to express to them particularly his gratitude for the personal and financial sacrifices for the missions. Yet, the whole human race drove itself into two opposing camps, for Christ or against Christ. “The human race is involved today in a supreme crisis, which will issue in its salvation by Christ, or in its dire destruction. The preachers of the Gospel are using their talents and energy to extend the Kingdom of Christ; but there are other preachers who, since they profess materialism and reject all hope of eternal happiness, are trying to drag men down to an abject condition.”
