= Simon Lei Chang-hsia =

Chinese clergyman and auxiliary bishop

- Bishop of Fenyang
- Native name: 雷震霞
- Church: Catholic Church
- Diocese: Bishop of Fenyang
- In office: 9 June 1949 – 16 February 1970
- Predecessor: Francis Liu Jin-wen
- Successor: John Huo Cheng

Orders
- Ordination: 15 January 1939
- Consecration: 14 August 1949 by Antonio Riberi

Personal details
- Born: 11 October 1915
- Died: 16 February 1970 (aged 54)

Simon Lei Chang-hsia (11 October 1915 – 16 February 1970) was a Chinese clergyman and auxiliary bishop for the Roman Catholic Diocese of Fenyang. He became ordained in 1939. He was appointed bishop in 1949. He died in 1970.
