= Cloneen =

- Location within KwaZulu-Natal Location within South Africa
- Coordinates: 27.902°S 30.157°E
- Country: South Africa
- Province: KwaZulu-Natal
- District: Amajuba
- Municipality: Dannhauser

Area
  - Total: 8.99 km^{2} (3.47 sq mi)

Population (2011)
  - Total: 4,360
  - Density: 485/km^{2} (1,260/sq mi)

Racial makeup (2011)
  - Black African: 99.3%
  - Coloured: 0.2%
  - Indian/Asian: 0.4%
  - White: 0.1%

First languages (2011)
  - Zulu: 95.5%
  - English: 1.1%
  - S. Ndebele: 1.0%
  - Other: 2.5%
- Time zone: UTC+2 (SAST)
- PO box: 3080

Cloneen is a town in Dannhauser Local Municipality in the KwaZulu-Natal province of South Africa.
