= Diocese of Anguo =

Roman Catholic diocese in China

Coordinates: 38°25′N 115°19′E

Diocese of Anguo Dioecesis Ngancuovensis 安国教区

Location
- Country: China
- Ecclesiastical province: Beijing
- Metropolitan: Beijing

Statistics
- Population: Total; Catholics: (as of 1949); 1,200,000; 33,200 (2.8%)

Information
- Denomination: Roman Catholic
- Rite: Latin Rite

Current leadership
- Pope: Leo XIV
- Bishop: Sede Vacante
- Metropolitan Archbishop: Joseph Li Shan

The Roman Catholic Diocese of Anguo (Latin: Ngancuoven(sis), Chinese: 安國) is a diocese located in the city of Anguo in the ecclesiastical province of Beijing in China.

== History ==
- April 15, 1924: Established as the Apostolic Prefecture of Lixian 蠡縣 from the Apostolic Vicariate of Central Chi-Li 直隸中境 and Apostolic Vicariate of Southwestern Chi-Li 直隸西南
- July 13, 1929: Promoted as Apostolic Vicariate of Anguo 安國
- April 11, 1946: Promoted as Diocese of Anguo 安國

== Leadership ==
- Bishops of Anguo 安國 (Roman rite)
  - Bishop John Baptist Wang Zeng-yi, C.M. (王增義) (April 11, 1946 – February 21, 1951)
- Vicars Apostolic of Anguo 安國 (Roman Rite)
  - Bishop John Baptist Wang Zeng-yi, C.M. (王增義) (July 1, 1937 – April 11, 1946)
  - Bishop Melchior Sun De-zhen (Souen), C.M. (孫德禎) (June 24, 1926 – 1937)
