= Durnacol =

- Location within KwaZulu-Natal Location within South Africa
- Coordinates: 28°03′S 30°01′E
- Country: South Africa
- Province: KwaZulu-Natal
- District: Amajuba
- Municipality: Dannhauser
- Main Place: Dannhauser

Area
  - Total: 22.02 km^{2} (8.50 sq mi)

Population (2011)
  - Total: 3,233
  - Density: 146.8/km^{2} (380.3/sq mi)

Racial makeup (2011)
  - Black African: 88.6%
  - Coloured: 2.2%
  - Indian/Asian: 4.5%
  - White: 4.3%
  - Other: 0.5%

First languages (2011)
  - Zulu: 87.8%
  - English: 6.8%
  - Afrikaans: 3.1%
  - Other: 2.3%
- Time zone: UTC+2 (SAST)
- PO box: 3082
- Area code: 034

Durnacol is a small suburban town in the central part of KwaZulu-Natal, South Africa. The name is an acronym for Durban Navigation Collieries, a mine that was opened at the turn of the 20th century. The mine mainly produced coking coal for the shipping industries, but later the coal was used in the smelting of iron. At the height of its activity, some 5000 people worked at the mine. The mine ceased production activities in 2000. At present, the area of the mine property is being rehabilitated and is being managed by the local municipality. Many of the mining company's houses have been sold to individual owners.

A methane explosion at Durban Navigation Colliery on 8 October 1926 killed 124 miners. It is the worst mine explosion in South Africa's history.
