= Diocese of Lüliang =

Roman Catholic diocese in China

Diocese of Fenyang 天主教吕梁教区

Location
- Country: China
- Ecclesiastical province: Taiyuan
- Metropolitan: Taiyuan

Statistics
- Area: 21,000 km^{2} (8,100 sq mi)
- Population: Total; Catholics: (as of 2024); 3,346,500; about 20,000 (0.6%)

Information
- Rite: Latin Rite
- Cathedral: Cathedral Church of the Sacred Heart of Jesus, Fenyang

Current leadership
- Pope: Leo XIV
- Bishop: Anthony Ji Weizhong

The Roman Catholic Diocese of Lüliang (simplified Chinese: 吕梁; traditional Chinese: 呂梁) is a diocese located in the city of Lüliang (Shanxi) in the ecclesiastical province of Taiyuan in China.

== History ==
- May 12, 1926: Established as Apostolic Vicariate of Fenyang 汾陽 from the Apostolic Vicariate of Taiyuanfu 太原府)
- April 11, 1946: Promoted as Diocese of Fenyang 汾陽
- October 28, 2024: Suppressed Diocese of Fenyang 汾陽, newly erected Diocese of Lüliang 呂梁

== Leadership ==
- Vicars Apostolic of Fenyang 汾陽 (Roman Rite)
  - Bishop Aloysius Chen Guodi (Tchen Chao-t’ien), O.F.M. (陳國砥) (May 10, 1926 – March 9, 1930)
  - Bishop Francis Liu Jin-wen (Liu Chiu-wen) (劉錦文) (July 23, 1930 – April 11, 1946)
- Bishops of Fenyang 汾陽 (Roman rite)
  - Bishop Francis Liu Jin-wen (Liu Chiu-wen) (劉錦文) (April 11, 1946 – January 15, 1948)
  - Bishop Simon Lei Chang-hsia (雷震霞) (June 9, 1949 – 1963)
  - Bishop John Huo Cheng (霍成) (1991 – January 2, 2023)
- Bishops of Lüliang 吕梁 (Roman rite)
  - Bishop Anthony Ji Weizhong (冀伟忠) (October 28, 2024 -)
