= Hattingspruit =

- Location within KwaZulu-Natal Location within South Africa
- Coordinates: 28°04′S 30°07′E
- Country: South Africa
- Province: KwaZulu-Natal
- District: Amajuba
- Municipality: Dannhauser

Area
  - Total: 24.21 km^{2} (9.35 sq mi)

Population (2011)
  - Total: 951
  - Density: 39.3/km^{2} (102/sq mi)

Racial makeup (2011)
  - Black African: 82.9%
  - Coloured: 0.4%
  - Indian/Asian: 1.5%
  - White: 15.1%
  - Other: 0.1%

First languages (2011)
  - Zulu: 80.8%
  - Afrikaans: 8.3%
  - English: 7.8%
  - Sign language: 1.5%
  - Other: 1.7%
- Time zone: UTC+2 (SAST)
- PO box: 3081

Hattingspruit was established in the 1880s as a coal mining town in KwaZulu-Natal, South Africa. It is situated on the banks of the Tom Worthington Dam.
