= Jacques Leclercq =

Belgian Catholic priest and theologian (1891–1971)

Jacques Leclercq (1891 in Brussels – 1971 in Beaufays) was a Belgian Catholic theologian and priest.

== Life ==
He received a degree in law from the Université libre de Bruxelles and one in philosophy from the University of Louvain (UCLouvain), and was ordained a priest in 1917. He was a theologian and a professor at Saint-Louis University, Brussels, Belgium and the UCLouvain. In 1926 he founded the revue La Cité chrétienne.

In addition to many publications, Jacques Leclercq helped to found the School of Political and Social Sciences at the Université catholique de Louvain and the Society for Political and Social Studies. In 1955, he founded Centre de Recherches sociologiques. He was a supporter of the Second Vatican Council.

From 1945 on he was in favor of the creation of a regional Walloon Christian-inspired movement, Rénovation wallonne, and wrote in 1963 an appeal to Catholics to rally to the movement, titled Les catholiques et la question wallonne ("Catholics and the Walloon question").

The building that houses the School of Political and Social Sciences (PSAD) at the University of Louvain (UCLouvain) in Louvain-la-Neuve is named for him.

Leclercq was a biographer of Frédéric-Vincent Lebbe, a Catholic missionary to China.

Writing on Chiang Kai-shek's anticorruption efforts, Leclercq observed that they were hypocritical and a failure, contending, "As we know now, it was on this point that [Chiang's] work ultimately failed, and it was later to be the cause of the final catastrophe."

== Publications ==
- La conscience chrétienne devant l'impôt, in La Revue Nouvelle,15 February 1954, Casterman.
- Christianity and money, New York : Hawthorn Books, ©1959.
- The nuclear age, [Paris?] : Published by Le Chêne and distributed by Hachette, ©1986.
- Approaches to the cross, New York : Macmillan, 1963.
- Marriage and the family, a study in social philosophy, New York and Cincinnati, Frederick Pustet Co. 1941.
- This day is ours , Maryknoll, N.Y. : Orbis Books, 1980.
- The Christian and world integration. , New York, Hawthorn Books [1963].
- A shrinking world?, London : Burns & Oates, 1963.
- Christ and the modern conscience., New York, Sheed & Ward, [1962].
- Christians in the world. , New York, Sheed & Ward, [1961].
- Back to Christ, from Essays in Catholic morals., New York, P.J. Kenedy & Sons [1932].
- Faith and intelligence., Dublin : Clonmore and Reynolds, 1954.
- Thunder in the distance; the life of Père Lebbe...., New York, Sheed & Ward [1958].
- The interior life., New York, P.J. Kenedy & Sons [©1961].
- Man of God for others., Westminster, Md., Newman Press [1967, ©1968].
- Back to Jesus., New York, P.J. Kenedy [1959].
- Les grandes lignes de la philosophie morale, Louvain : Publications universitaires de Louvain, 1954.
- A Year with the liturgy : meditations and prayers., Chicago; Dublin; London : Scepter, 1959.
- Marriage, a great sacrament. , Dublin, Clonmore and Reynolds, 1951.
- The religious vocation., New York, Kenedy [1955].
