= Diocese of Puqi =

Roman Catholic diocese in China

Diocese of Puqi Dioecesis Puchivanus 天主教蒲圻教区

Location
- Country: China
- Ecclesiastical province: Hankou
- Metropolitan: Hankou

Statistics
- Population: Total; Catholics: (as of 1950); 765,000; 5,413 (0.7%)

Information
- Rite: Latin Rite
- Cathedral: Cathedral in Chibi City

Current leadership
- Pope: Leo XIV
- Bishop: Sede Vacante
- Metropolitan Archbishop: Sede Vacante

The Roman Catholic Diocese of Puqi/Puchi (Latin: Puchivan(us), Chinese: 蒲圻) is a diocese located in the city of Puqi (Hubei) in the ecclesiastical province of Hankou in China.

== History ==
- December 12, 1923: Established as Apostolic Prefecture of Puqi 蒲圻 from the Apostolic Vicariate of Eastern Hupeh 湖北東境
- May 10, 1951: Promoted as Diocese of Puqi 蒲圻

== Leadership ==
- Bishops of Puqi 蒲圻 (Roman rite)
  - Bishop Joseph Li Dao-nan (李道南) (May 10, 1951 – 1973)
- Prefects Apostolic of Puqi 蒲圻 (Roman Rite)
  - Fr. Joseph Li Dao-nan (李道南) (later Bishop) (February 23, 1949 – May 10, 1951)
  - Fr. Joseph Zhang Jing-xiu (張敬修) (April 16, 1929 – 1941)
  - Bishop Odoric Cheng Hede, O.F.M. (成和德) (March 21, 1924 – November 13, 1928)
