= John Huo Cheng =

Chinese bishop (1926–2023)

The Most Reverend John Huo Cheng
- Bishop of Fenyang
- Metropolis: Taiyuan
- Installed: 4 September 1991
- Term ended: 2 January 2023
- Predecessor: Anthony Gao Yong
- Successor: Vacant

Orders
- Ordination: 14 May 1954
- Consecration: 4 September 1991 by Benedict Bonaventura Zhangxin

Personal details
- Born: 1 February 1926 Qi County, Shanxi, China
- Died: 2 January 2023 (aged 96) Fenyang, Shanxi, China
- Denomination: Roman Catholic

John Huo Cheng (Chinese: 霍成; pinyin: Huò Chéng; 1 February 1926 – 2 January 2023) was a Chinese Roman Catholic bishop.

== Life ==
Bishop Huo was born in 1926. After practicing Taoism, he joined the theological seminary and on 14 May 1954 was ordained a priest. During the Cultural Revolution, he was detained and sent to a labour camp, where he spent time from 1966 until his release in 1980. He was consecrated as a diocesan bishop of Fenyang on 4 September 1991 and was recognised both by the Holy See and by the Chinese government.

Catholic Church titles
Preceded by Benedict Bonaventura Zhangxin	Bishop of Fenyang; 1991–2023	Succeeded by Vacant
