= Dannhauser =

- Location within KwaZulu-Natal Location within South Africa
- Coordinates: 28°00′00″S 30°03′00″E
- Country: South Africa
- Province: KwaZulu-Natal
- District: Amajuba
- Municipality: Dannhauser

Area
  - Total: 8.9 km^{2} (3.4 sq mi)

Population (2011)
  - Total: 5,389
  - Density: 610/km^{2} (1,600/sq mi)

Racial makeup (2011)
  - Black African: 73.7%
  - Coloured: 1.8%
  - Indian/Asian: 22.0%
  - White: 1.8%
  - Other: 0.6%

IsiZulus (2011)
  - IsiZulu: 70.4%
  - English: 23.7%
  - Afrikaans: 1.8%
  - Other: 4.1%
- Time zone: UTC+2 (SAST)
- PO box: 3080
- Area code: 034

Dannhauser is a former coal mining town in KwaZulu-Natal, South Africa.

== History ==
The town of Dannhauser was named after Renier Dannhauser, a German settler, who purchased the farm Palmietfontein from the Natal Government in 1872. It was proclaimed a village in 1937.

== Description ==
Cattle and sheep farming takes place in the district.

Modern Dannhauser encompasses five farms: Tweediedale, Gleneagles, Rocky Branch, Cornwall and Klipkuil. Housing in Durnacol is relatively inexpensive now as the coal mines there are no longer operational.

The town consists of one main street,and the main shops are the post office, bank, pharmacy, grocery and hardware stores.
