= Dannhauser Local Municipality =

Coordinates: 27.7666°S 30.8000°E

Dannhauser
- Local municipality
- Seal

- Location in KwaZulu-Natal
- Country: South Africa
- Province: KwaZulu-Natal
- District: Amajuba
- Seat: Dannhauser
- Wards: 13

Government
  - Type: Municipal council

Area
  - Total: 1,516 km^{2} (585 sq mi)

Population (2011)
  - Total: 102,161
  - Density: 67.39/km^{2} (174.5/sq mi)

Racial makeup (2011)
  - Black African: 97.5%
  - Coloured: 0.3%
  - Indian/Asian: 1.4%
  - White: 0.8%

First languages (2011)
  - Zulu: 93.9%
  - English: 2.1%
  - Other: 4%
- Time zone: UTC+2 (SAST)
- Municipal code: KZN254

Dannhauser Municipality (Zulu: UMasipala wase Dannhauser) is a local municipality within the Amajuba District Municipality, in the KwaZulu-Natal province of South Africa. The municipality is named after Renier Dannhauser, a German settler who in 1872 purchased four farms in the area from the Natal Government. The major economic sectors are agriculture and mining. Mining, however, is undergoing a movement away from large scale operations to smaller operations.

== Main places ==
The 2001 census divided the municipality into the following main places:

Place	Code	Area (km^{2})	Population
Dannhauser	52607	17.72	4,903
Durnacol	52602	19.49	1,598
Ekudabuleni	52603	0.30	565
Gule	52604	50.47	8,451
Hattingspruit	52605	2.67	476
Hlubi	52606	360.59	79,377
Remainder of the municipality	52601	1,064.45	7,397

== Politics ==
The municipal council consists of twenty-five members elected by mixed-member proportional representation. Thirteen councillors are elected by first-past-the-post voting in thirteen wards, while the remaining twelve are chosen from party lists so that the total number of party representatives is proportional to the number of votes received.

In the election of 4 November 2026 the African National Congress, no party won a majority. The Inkatha Freedom Party and uMkhonto weSizwe Party both won seven seats.

The following table shows the results of the election.

Party	Ward			List			Total seats
Party	Votes	%	Seats	Votes	%	Seats	Total seats
uMkhonto weSizwe Party	8,537	28.32	7	9,117	30.14	0	7
Inkatha Freedom Party	7,842	26.01	5	7,807	25.81	2	7
African National Congress	5,446	18.06	1	5,413	17.89	4	5
Democratic Alliance	1,347	4.47	0	1,403	4.64	1	1
ActionSA	922	3.06	0	903	2.99	1	1
Sisonke Solidarity Movement	840	2.79	0	797	2.63	1	1
Majuba Progressive Movement	730	2.42	0	727	2.40	1	1
Economic Freedom Fighters	717	2.38	0	626	2.07	1	1
Amandla Awethu Movement	630	2.09	0	612	2.02	1	1
Independent candidates	151	0.50	0				0
19 other parties	2,988	9.91	0	2,844	9.40	0	0
Total	30,150	100.00	13	30,249	100.00	12	25
Valid votes	30,150	97.18		30,249	97.37		
Invalid/blank votes	875	2.82		818	2.63		
Total votes	31,025	100.00		31,067	100.00		
Registered voters/turnout	57,185	54.25		57,185	54.33		
