= James Cunniffe =

American armed robber (1895–1926)

- Born: June 10, 1895; Manhattan, New York City, U.S
- Died: October 31, 1926 (aged 31); Highland Park, Michigan, U.S.
- Cause of death: Gunshot wounds
- Other name: "Killer"
- Occupation: Criminal
- Known for: 1926 Elizabeth, New Jersey mail robbery

James Cunniffe (also known as Killer; June 10, 1895 – October 31, 1926) was an American armed robber who organized and carried out a major robbery on the United States Postal Service in Elizabeth, New Jersey, in 1926, one of the most widely publicized thefts of the decade. On October 14, 1926, he and seven accomplices armed with submachine guns hijacked a U.S. mail truck, escaping with about $161,000 in cash and securities. During the gun battle, the truck driver was killed and both his assistant and a responding police officer were wounded.

The robbery received extensive national coverage and was later described as one of the most significant mail robberies before the "Public enemy" era of the 1930s. In response, President Calvin Coolidge ordered U.S. Marines to escort valuable mail shipments and approved the use of Thompson submachine guns for postal guard duty. The Marine Corps thereby became an early official purchaser of the weapon later famous as the "Tommy gun".

Weeks after the Elizabeth holdup, Cunniffe was shot and killed in Highland Park, Michigan, by fellow gang member William "Ice Wagon" Crowley, who also fatally shot Cunniffe's girlfriend before being killed in a shootout with police. Police later linked Cunniffe to several major robberies, including a $300,000 mail theft involving William "Bum" Rodgers and a Long Island bank holdup.

== Biography ==
=== Early life and criminal activity ===
James Cunniffe was born in Manhattan, New York City on June 10, 1895. Little documentation survives about his early years, and most contemporary accounts focus on his involvement in interstate robberies during the 1920s. Newspapers later described him as a dangerous armed robber and gang leader active in New York and New Jersey.

By the mid-1920s, Cunniffe was part of a tightly connected group of professional criminals involved in mail and bank robberies across the Northeast United States. This circle included William "Ice Wagon" Crowley, Jack Slattery, Jocko Moore, Ambrose Ross, and William "Bum" Rodgers. In 1930, True Detective Mysteries reported that Frank Kiekert, a suspect in the Elizabeth robbery, confessed to a Long Island bank holdup and identified several of these men—including Cunniffe—as accomplices, though he later recanted.

=== 1926 New Jersey mail robbery ===
On October 14, 1926, a U.S. mail truck left the Elizabeth, New Jersey post office carrying $161,000 in registered mail. Cunniffe and seven accomplices forced the vehicle to stop using multiple automobiles. The gang was heavily armed with pistols and submachine guns, demonstrating the increasing firepower of criminal organizations in the Prohibition era.

A gun battle erupted between the gang and the mail guards. The driver of Cunniffe's gang was killed, the guard severely wounded, and a responding police officer injured. Despite resistance, Cunniffe and his accomplices escaped with the mail sacks.

Newspapers across the country emphasized both the size of the loot and the sophistication of the crime. The attack was seen as emblematic of the increasing boldness of gang-led mail robberies during the 1920s. Later crime histories continued to list the Elizabeth robbery among the most significant mail heists of the era.

=== Federal response and Marine mail guards ===
The Elizabeth robbery revived federal concerns about the vulnerability of mail shipments, echoing an earlier 1921 wave of robberies. In October 1926, after cabinet meetings, President Coolidge ordered U.S. Marines to escort mail shipments and guard postal facilities. Marines were deployed aboard trains, in postal sorting rooms, and along high-risk truck routes.

Marine guards were armed with Thompson submachine guns and other military weapons to deter further attacks. The Marine Corps became one of the earliest branches of the U.S. military to adopt the Thompson for operational use.

Contemporary sources credited the Marine deployment with sharply reducing mail robberies in the months following the Elizabeth attack. Later postal histories cite the 1926 operation as a notable example of federal military involvement in civilian infrastructure during Prohibition.

=== Death ===
After the Elizabeth robbery, police in several states sought Cunniffe for questioning in other major holdups. On October 31, 1926, Cunniffe was staying under an alias in the Highland Court Apartments in Highland Park, Michigan. Accompanying him were William "Ice Wagon" Crowley and a woman described as his companion.

According to contemporary reports, an argument escalated into a confrontation in which Crowley shot and killed both Cunniffe and the woman. Neighbors reported hearing gunfire, and Highland Park officers Ernest Jones and Ephraim Rancour responded. When the officers approached, Crowley opened fire, killing Jones and wounding Rancour in the shoulder. Rancour returned fire despite his injury and subsequently shot and killed Crowley.

Police found approximately $10,000 in cash believed to be proceeds of recent robberies. They also recovered evidence linking the men to the Elizabeth mail robbery and a $300,000 holdup involving William "Bum" Rodgers. The killings and discovery of cash were widely reported in the United States and internationally.

== Legacy ==
Cunniffe's role in the 1926 Elizabeth robbery and his violent death have been cited in historical accounts of Prohibition-era crime as examples of the increasing organization and firepower of criminal gangs. Postal and Marine Corps histories identify the robbery as a catalyst for federal reforms and the renewed use of military escorts for mail shipments. Modern robbery surveys continue to list Cunniffe among the most notable U.S. mail bandits of the early twentieth century.
