= Durban Navigation Colliery disaster =

A methane explosion occurred at the Durban Navigation Colliery on 8 October 1926, killing 124 miners. It is the worst mine explosion in South Africa's history.
