= Maximum illud =

1919 encyclical by Benedict XV on missionary work

Maximum illud is an apostolic letter issued by Pope Benedict XV on 30 November 1919. As is traditional with such documents, it takes its title from the opening words of the original Latin text, meaning "that momentous". Benedict begins by recalling "that momentous and holy charge" found in Mark 16:15: "Go into the whole world and preach the gospel to all creation."

It identified the principles and priorities of the Catholic missions. It represented a break with Eurocentric and colonialist thought. It proposed instead an appreciation for cultural differences, a separation of the Church's work from political alliances, and the need to develop the resources of local churches to thrive independently once the missionaries withdraw in favor of an indigenous priesthood and episcopacy. It established, according to Cardinal Fernando Filoni, that "the Church could no longer be linked to the reality of that moment where there were so many nationalisms and the desire to promote a certain colonialism through religion: a union that had to be broken. The Catholic missionary, Pope Benedict XV said, presents himself as an ambassador of Christ, not as a messenger of his own nation."

Though not an encyclical, it is sometimes identified as the first of five papal encyclicals issued between 1919 and 1959 that redefined the Church’s missionary role.

== Background ==
In the second half of the 19th century, the Vatican recognized the need to overhaul the administration and spirit of missionary activities. Pope Leo XIII and Pope Pius X both tried to curb the authority of the French-dominated Congregation for the Doctrine of the Faith.

The Belgian missionary to China Frédéric-Vincent Lebbe campaigned for the appointment of indigenous bishops to replace French missionary bishops. He immersed himself in Chinese culture from the time of his arrival and ordination in 1901, learning the language and adopting native attire. He criticized various foreign religious organizations for the practice of controlling Chinese Catholicism to the benefit of their home countries, proposing the slogan "Return China to the Chinese and the Chinese will go to Christ". He angered his superiors in the Lazarist order by promoting the appointment of bishops of Chinese nationality.

At the same time, the ongoing rivalries of the European powers in Africa and Asia presented a challenge to the missionary enterprise, and the conclusion of World War I represented a break with the colonial past, as the Treaty of Versailles established mandates under the authority of the League of Nations that anticipated an end to colonial rule.

Maximum Illud was directed primarily towards the situation of the Catholic Church in China, although it did not explicitly reference China.

=== Diplomatic background ===
Since the 1840s, France had asserted a religious protectorate in China, creating a sustained diplomatic dispute with the Holy See about who had authority over Chinese Catholics. France blocked attempts by Leo XIII to establish bilateral relations between the Holy See and China, threatening the Holy See that it would withdraw its own ambassador to the Holy See and apply punitive measures against the Catholic Church in France. According to Leo XIII, the failure to establish relations with China was "the greatest sorrow of [his] pontificate." France also blocked attempts by Pius X and Benedict XV, contending that the Holy See had no sovereign territory and no right to independent action in international affairs.

In 1917-1918, France blocked another of the Holy See's efforts to establish diplomatic relations with the Republic of China. Although China's Beiyang government and the Holy See had reached a tentative agreement, France gathered support from the other World War I allied powers to pressure China to abandon these efforts (contending that because the proposed apostolic nuncio was German, the effort was a Germany-Holy See plot).

== Content ==
Maximum Illud was primarily drafted by Cardinal Willem van Rossum, who was the head of the Propaganda Fide.

The encyclical instructed the leaders of missions to put aside the lesser concerns of their national interests and commit to the long-term good of an indigenous church. It stated:

It would be tragic indeed if any of our missionaries forgot the dignity of their office so completely as to busy themselves with the interests of their terrestrial homeland instead of with those of their homeland in heaven. It would be a tragedy indeed if an apostolic man were to spend himself in attempts to increase and exalt the prestige of the native land he once left behind him. Such behavior would infect his apostolate like a plague.

The encyclical recalled the great apostles of the Gospel who contributed much to the expansion of missions. He reviewed the recent history of the missions. It first turned to the bishops and superiors in charge of the Catholic missions, noting the need to train local clergy. Catholic missionaries are reminded that their goal is a spiritual one, which must be carried out in a selfless way.

The pope underlined the necessity of proper preparation for the work in foreign cultures and the need to acquire language skills before going there. He requests a continued striving for personal sanctity and praises the selfless work of female religious in the missions. Mission is not only for missionaries: all Catholics must participate, through their Apostolate of Prayer, by supporting vocations, and by helping financially. The encyclical concludes by pointing out several organizations which organize and supervise mission activities within the Catholic Church.

Noting the end of World War I, Benedict repeated the biblical mandate to go to the ends of the earth and preach the gospel. He recalled the examples of Francis Xavier in India and Bartolomé de las Casas in the Americas and others to show what individuals can do in the service of God. Many missionaries died as martyrs for their faith and many live like saints. He noted great success to date: "Anyone who studies the facts of this great saga cannot help being profoundly impressed by them: by all the stupendous hardships our missionaries have undergone in extending the Faith, the magnificent devotion they have shown, and the overwhelming examples of intrepid endurance they have afforded us. And to anyone who weighs these facts the realization must come as a shock that right now, there still remain in the world immense multitudes of people who dwell in darkness and in the shadow of death. According to a recent estimate, the number of non-believers in the world approximates one billion souls."

He emphasized the need for missionaries to develop local clergy to extend their work. Anyone who has charge of a mission must to secure and train local candidates for the ministry: "In this policy lies the greatest hope of the new churches. For the local priest, one with his people by birth, by nature, by his sympathies and his aspirations, is remarkably effective in appealing to their mentality and thus attracting them to the Faith. Far better than anyone else he knows the kind of argument they will listen to, and as a result, he often has easy access to places where a foreign priest would not be tolerated."

== Reception ==
According to academic Stephanie M. Wong, "Maximum Illud did not settle the question of native bishops but brought the debate out into the open."

In the European countries, there was relatively little attention paid to the encyclical; it prompted a stronger response in China. Benedict's message divided the French missions in China into the "Lebbe Faction" and the "French Faction". The leadership of one of the most prominent missionary orders, the German Society of the Divine Word, had contributed to the anti-European Chinese uprising known as the Boxer Rebellion, and then criticized Lebbé and doubted that suitable Chinese candidates could be readied for episcopal ordination promptly. Some resisted the Vatican through inaction or argued that the protected legal status granted foreigners in China gave the missionaries a more secure position than any indigenous clergy could enjoy. Many nevertheless recognized that ordaining growing numbers of Chinese nationals to the priesthood was creating greater rivalry than rapprochement with their European counterparts.

Benedict's successor, Pope Pope Pius XI, continued to press for a new approach to missionary work. In 1922 he appointed as Apostolic Delegate to China Celso Costantini, who persuaded two European-born bishops to yield territory to allow for the appointment of two indigenous Chinese as apostolic vicars in 1924. In some historical views, Costantini's arrival in China marks the end of the French religious protectorate there.

Costantini identified six indigenous Chinese candidates for episcopal appointments and accompanied them to Rome where they received their episcopal consecration from Pius on 28 October 1926. Pius reinforced the principles of Maximum illud in his encyclical Rerum Ecclesiae of 8 February 1926. In some regions progress came more quickly. Pius named the first India-born bishop of the Latin rite, the Jesuit Francis T. Roche, in 1923. By the time of his death in 1939, Pius had appointed forty indigenous bishops in missionary lands, the first of the modern era.

Later development of Catholic doctrine requires a revision of Benedict's assertion in Maximum illud that the missions targeted those who "lived in ignorance of God, and thus, bound by the chains of their blind and violent desires, are enslaved in the most hideous of all forms of slavery, the service of Satan". The Church's view of other religions since Nostra aetate (1965) recognizes shared values and encourages respectful dialogue.

== Later recognition ==
In 2017, Pope Francis noted the approaching centennial of this apostolic letter and called for October 2019 to be celebrated as an "Extraordinary Missionary Month". He noted that in Maximum illud Benedict tried to promote evangelization "purified of any colonial overtones and kept far away from the nationalistic and expansionistic aims that had proved so disastrous". He wrote: "The Apostolic Letter Maximum illud called for transcending national boundaries and bearing witness, with prophetic spirit and evangelical boldness, to God's saving will through the Church’s universal mission."

The idea for special recognition of the Church's missionary work derived from a proposal by the Congregation for the Evangelization of Peoples that called for renewed consideration of Ad gentes, a 1965 decree of the Second Vatican Council on the missionary activity of the Church. He described Maximum illud as a milestone in the evolution of the Church's missionary work:

First there was an aggregate form of colonialism, then something only of the Western Church, now missionary activity is extended to everyone and in particular to the Churches that find in the so-called missions countries: no one better than them can do a mission. If we take the mission lands, Africa, Asia, Oceania, we see that we have local Churches, "young Churches". As Paul VI said in Uganda: now it is your turn to be missionaries of yourselves.

Archbishop Giampietro Dal Toso, president of the Pontifical Mission Societies, said the missionary renewal was linked to the Synod of Bishops on the Amazon scheduled to take place the same month.

== See also ==
- Cultural imperialism
- Evangelization
