= Philippus Zhao Huaiyi =

Chinese bishop

- Bishop of the Apostolic Vicariate of Xuanhua
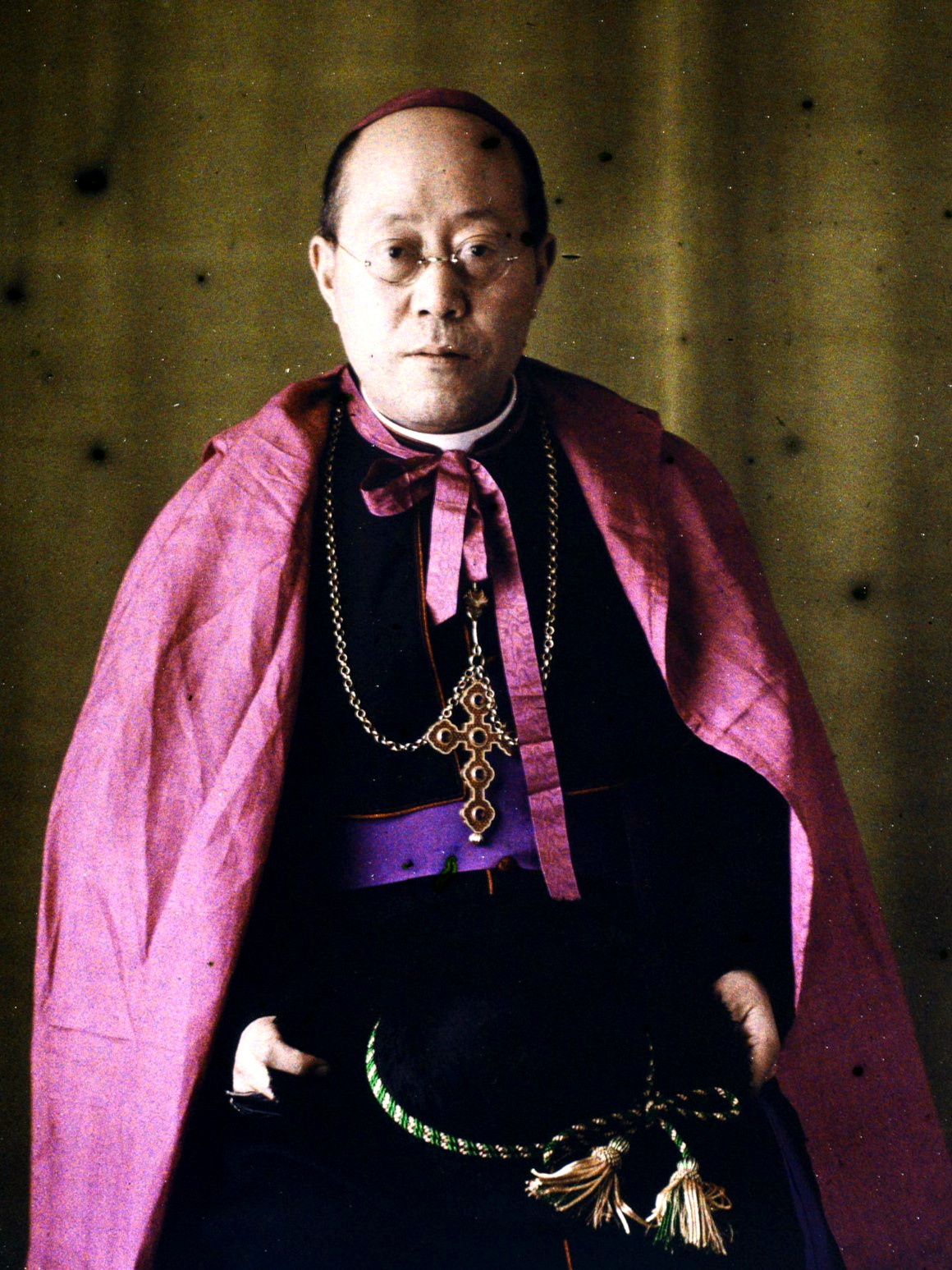
- Philippus Zhao Huaiyi in December 1926. Autochrome by Georges Chevalier.
- Native name: 赵怀义
- Province: Beijing
- Diocese: Apostolic Vicariate of Xuanhua
- Installed: 10 May 1926
- Term ended: 14 October 1927
- Predecessor: New position
- Successor: Peter Cheng You-you

Orders
- Ordination: by Pope Pius XI

Personal details
- Born: October 4, 1880 Beijing, Qing dynasty
- Died: October 14, 1927 (aged 47) Beijing, China
- Denomination: Roman Catholic
- Motto: Impendam et Superimpender

Chinese name
- Traditional Chinese: 趙懷義
- Simplified Chinese: 赵怀义
Transcriptions
Standard Mandarin
- Hanyu Pinyin: Zhào Huáiyì

Philippus Zhao Huaiyi (Chinese: 赵怀义; 4 October 1880 - 14 October 1927) was one of the first six Chinese Catholic bishops of modern times.

== Biography ==
Zhao was born Zhao Bingyi (Chinese: 赵秉义) in Beijing, on October 4, 1880. Zhao was from a Catholic family. He was ordained a priest on February 27, 1904.

On October 28, 1926, he and five other Chinese priests (Odoric Cheng Hede, Simon Zhu Kaimin, Joseph Hu Ruoshan, Melchior Sun Dezhen, and Aloysius Chen Guodi) were ordained bishops by Pope Pius XI in Rome. They were the first six Chinese Catholic bishops of modern times. Zhao had been one of the recommendations made by Frédéric-Vincent Lebbe. Zhao was the personal secretary to Celso Benigno Luigi Costantini, at the time Zhao became a bishop.

The Holy See framed these consecrations as an important moment for indigenizing the Catholic Church. After leaving Rome, the new bishops toured Italy, France, Belgium, and Holland where crowds of local European Catholics greeted them.

Zhao was appointed to the apostolic vicariate of Xuanhua, which was a new vicariate created from north of Beijing.

He died in Beijing, on October 14, 1927.

Catholic Church titles
Previous: New position	Bishop of the Apostolic Vicariate of Xuanhua; 1926-1927	Next: Peter Cheng You-you
