= Melchior Sun De-zhen =

Roman Catholic bishop

Most Reverend Melchior Sun De-zhen
- Vicar Apostolic of Anguo
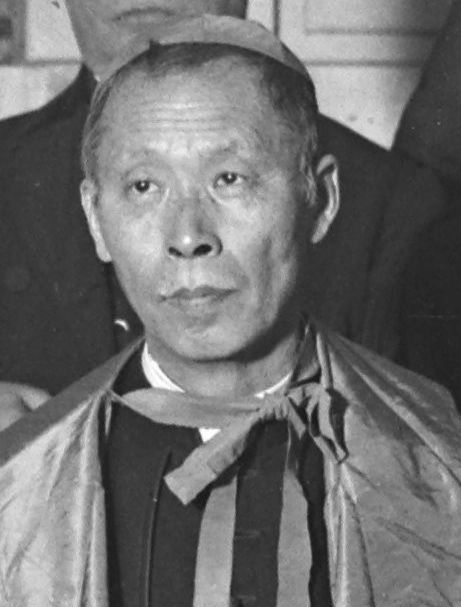
- Melchior Sun De Zhen in 1926.
- Church: Catholic Church
- In office: 1929–1936
- Predecessor: None
- Successor: John Baptist Wang Tseng-yi

Orders
- Ordination: 24 January 1897
- Consecration: 28 October 1926 by Pope Pius XI

Personal details
- Born: 19 November 1869 Beijing, China
- Died: 23 August 1951 (aged 81)

Melchior Sun Dezhen, C.M. or Melchior Sun Souen (Chinese: 孫德禎) (1869–1951) was a Roman Catholic prelate who served as Vicar Apostolic of Anguo (1929–1936), Titular Bishop of Esbus (1926–1951), and Prefect of Lihsien (1924–1926).

== Biography ==
Melchior Sun Dezhen was born in Beijing, China on 19 November 1869 and ordained a priest in the Congregation of the Mission on 24 January 1897. Sun was a diocesan priest in Beijing. He taught Latin for 12 years in the Beijing seminary and then worked as a missionary in rural China. Beginning in 1923, he was the apostolic prefect of Lixian.

On 24 June 1926, he was appointed during the papacy of Pope Pius XI as Titular Bishop of Esbus and on 28 October 1926, he was consecrated bishop by Pope Pius XI, with Carlo Cremonesi, Titular Archbishop of Nicomedia, and Celso Benigno Luigi Costantini, Titular Archbishop of Theodosiopolis in Arcadia, serving as co-consecrators. Sun and five other Chinese priests (Philippus Zhao Huaiyi, Simon Zhu Kaimin, Odoric Cheng Hede, Joseph Hu Ruoshan, and Aloysius Chen Guodi) were consecrated in Rome and became the first Chinese Catholic Bishops in modern times. The Holy See framed these consecrations as an important moment for indigenizing the Catholic Church. After leaving Rome, the new bishops toured Italy, France, Belgium, and Holland where crowds of local European Catholics greeted them.

Sun helped Frédéric-Vincent Lebbe return to China, inviting Lebbe to serve in the apostolic prefecture of Lixian.

On 15 July 1929, he was elevated during the papacy of Pope Pius XI as Vicar Apostolic of Anguo after the Prefecture was promoted to an Apostolic Vicariate. He resigned as bishop in 1936. He died in 1951.

== Episcopal succession ==
While bishop, he was the principal consecrator of:

- John Baptist Wang Zeng-yi (John Baptist Wang Tseng-yi) (Uamzemi), Titular Bishop of Lamia and Vicar Apostolic of Anguo (1938);

and the principal co-consecrator of:

- Peter Cheng You-you (Pierre Tcheng), Titular Bishop of Sozusa in Palaestina and Vicar Apostolic of Süanhwafu (1928);
- John Zhang Bi-de (John Chang Pi-te), Titular Bishop of Antipyrgos and Vicar Apostolic of Chaohsien (1932); and
- Peter Wang Mu-duo (Peter Wang Mu-To), Bishop of Xuanhua (1948).

== External links and additional sources ==
- Cheney, David M. "Diocese of Anguo [Ankwo]". Catholic-Hierarchy.org. (for Chronology of Bishops) ^{[self-published]}

Catholic Church titles
Preceded by None	Prefect Apostolic of Lihsien; 1924–1926	Succeeded by Prefecture elevated
Preceded by Lorenzo Petris de Dolammare	Titular Bishop of Esbus; 1926–1951	Succeeded by Georges-Arthur Melançon
Preceded by None	Vicar Apostolic of Anguo; 1929–1936	Succeeded by John Baptist Wang Tseng-yi
