= Joseph Hu Ruoshan =

Chinese Catholic bishop

Joseph Hu Ruoshan CM
- Bishop of Linhai
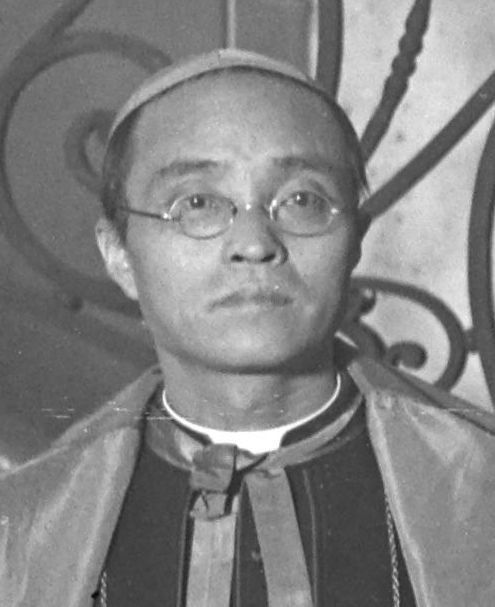
- Native name: 胡若山
- Church: Catholic Church
- Diocese: Diocese of Linhai
- In office: 30 July 1926 – 28 August 1962
- Predecessor: Vicariate erected
- Successor: Anthony Xu Ji-wei
- Previous post: Titular Bishop of Theodosiopolis in Armenia (1926-1946)

Orders
- Ordination: 5 June 1909
- Consecration: 28 October 1926 by Pope Pius XI

Personal details
- Born: 1881 Zhejiang Province, Great Qing
- Died: 28 August 1962 (aged 81)

Joseph Hu Ruoshan ( 胡若山) was one of the first six Chinese Catholic bishops of modern times. He lived from 1881 to 1962.

== Biography ==
Hu was born in Zhejiang Province and orphaned at age five. Hu was raised by Catholic missionaries.

Hu joined the Congregation of the Mission (the Vincentians) at age twenty-five and was ordained at age twenty-eight. He taught philosophy and dogmatic theology at the Catholic seminary of Ningbo. He was a consulting theologian for the 1924 Plenary Council of Shanghai.

In 1926, Hu and five other Chinese priests (Philippus Zhao Huaiyi, Simon Zhu Kaimin, Odoric Cheng Hede, Melchior Sun De-zhen, and Aloysius Chen Guodi) were consecrated in Rome and became the first Chinese Catholic Bishops in modern times. The Holy See framed these consecrations as an important moment for indigenizing the Catholic Church. After leaving Rome, the new bishops toured Italy, France, Belgium, and Holland where crowds of local European Catholics greeted them.

Hu was the Vicar Apostolic of Taizhou, later the diocese of Linhai.

He died in 1962.
