= Odoric Cheng Hede =

Chinese bishop

- Bishop of the Apostolic Prefecture of Puqi
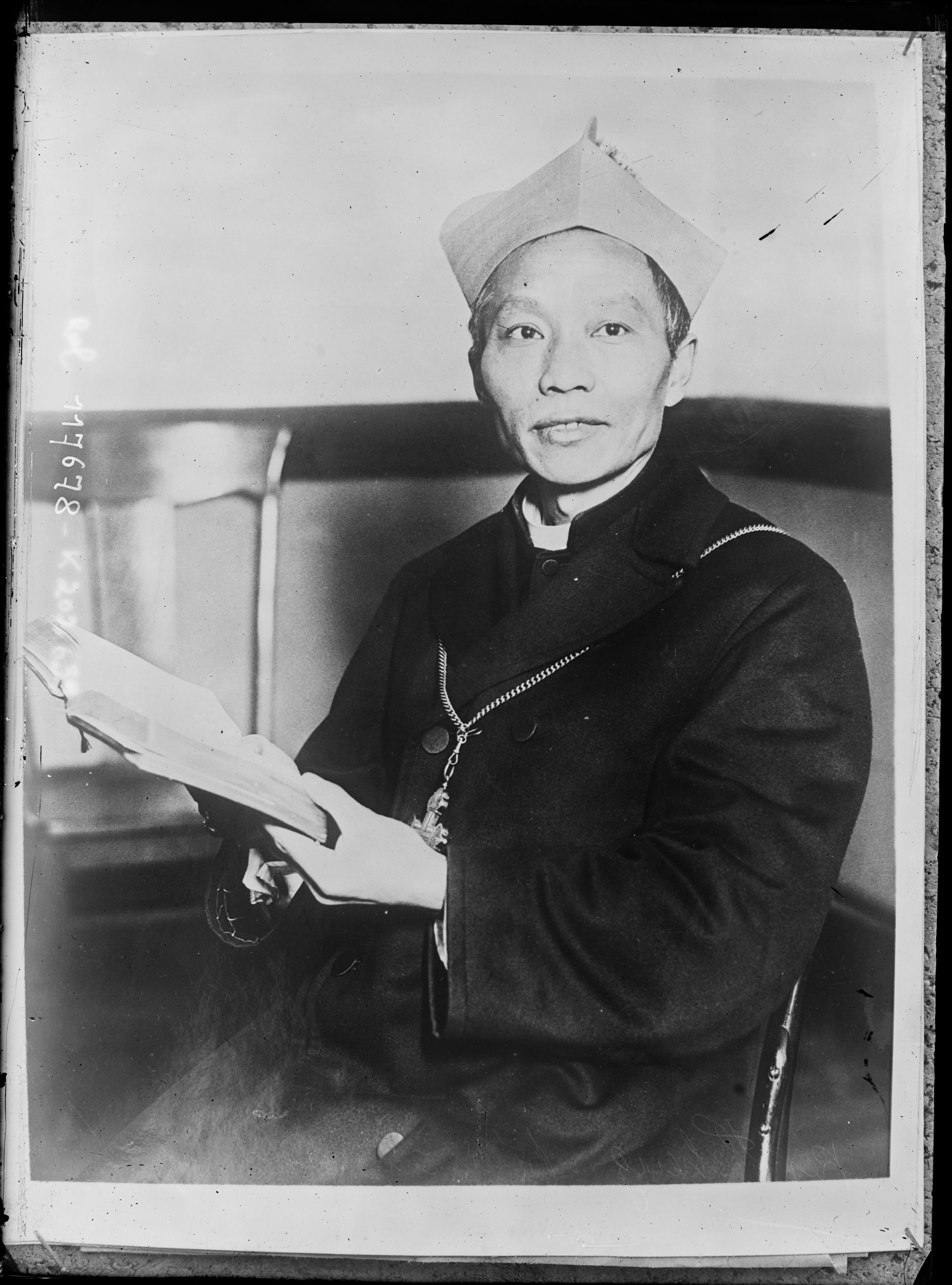
- Cheng in 1927
- Native name: 成和德
- Archdiocese: Roman Catholic Diocese of Puqi
- Province: Hubei
- Installed: March 21, 1924
- Term ended: November 13, 1928
- Predecessor: New position
- Successor: Joseph Zhang Jing-xiu

Orders
- Ordination: 28 October 1926 by Pope Pius XI

Personal details
- Born: July 22, 1873 Laohekou, Hubei, Qing dynasty
- Died: November 14, 1928 (aged 55) Hengyang, Hunan, Republic of China
- Denomination: Roman Catholic

Chinese name
- Chinese: 成和德
Transcriptions
Standard Mandarin
- Hanyu Pinyin: Chéng Hédé

Cheng Hede (Chinese: 成和德; 22 July 1873 - 14 November 1928) was a Chinese Roman Catholic Bishop of Roman Catholic Diocese of Hubei, China.

== Biography ==
Cheng was born in Laohekou, Hubei, in 1873. Cheng primarily studied at Chayuangou Catholic Church (Chinese: 茶园沟修道院).

As a child, Cheng traveled to Italy with his family and joined the Franciscans.

In 1903 he returned to China. Cheng worked as a seminary administrator and professor. In 1903, he became vice president of Chayuangou Catholic Church, where he worked there for 14 years. He wrote piety books and historical works, translated Saint Francis of Assisi's rule from Italian to Chinese, and wrote an Italian grammar book intended for Chinese readers.

In 1923, Celso Benigno Luigi Costantini appointed Cheng as apostolic prefect in Puqi.

In 1926, he and five other Chinese priests (Philippus Zhao Huaiyi, Simon Zhu Kaimin, Joseph Hu Ruoshan, Melchior Sun De-zhen, and Aloysius Chen Guodi) were consecrated in Rome and became the first Chinese Catholic Bishops in modern times. The Holy See framed these consecrations as an important moment for indigenizing the Catholic Church. After leaving Rome, the new bishops toured Italy, France, Belgium, and Holland where crowds of local European Catholics greeted them.

Cheng returned to China in 1927. He served as Bishop in Puqi until his death.

He died in Hengyang, Hunan, on November 13, 1928. He was buried in Puqi.

Catholic Church titles
Previous: New position	Bishop of the Apostolic Prefecture of Puqi; 1924-1928	Next: Joseph Xu Zhixuan
