= Simon Zhu Kaimin =

Chinese Roman Catholic Bishop

His Excellency, The Most Reverend Simon Zhu Kaimin SJ
- Apostolic Vicar of Haimen; Bishop of Haimen
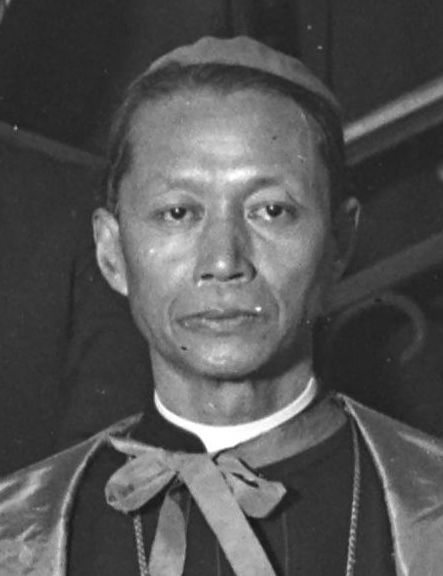
- Simon Zhu Kaimin in December 1926.
- Native name: 朱开敏
- Archdiocese: Roman Catholic Diocese of Haimen
- Province: Jiangsu
- Installed: August 2, 1926
- Term ended: February 22, 1960
- Predecessor: New position
- Successor: Mark Yuan Wen-zai

Orders
- Ordination: by Pope Pius XI

Personal details
- Born: October 30, 1868 Shanghai, Qing dynasty
- Died: February 22, 1960 (aged 91) Haimen, Jiangsu, China
- Denomination: Roman Catholic
- Parents: Zhu Puzhai (朱朴斋); Ma Jianshu (马健淑)
- Coat of arms: Simon Zhu Kaimin's coat of arms

Chinese name
- Traditional Chinese: 朱開敏
- Simplified Chinese: 朱开敏
Transcriptions
Standard Mandarin
- Hanyu Pinyin: Zhū Kāimǐn

Simon Zhu Kaimin, SJ (Chinese: 朱开敏; 30 October 1868 - 22 February 1960) was a Chinese Catholic prelate who served as Bishop of Jiangsu. He was also a member of the Society of Jesus.

== Name ==
His given name is Ximeng (Chinese: 希孟). His Zi is Mingde (Chinese: 铭德). His Hao is Jiqiu (Chinese: 季球) and Kaimin (Chinese: 开敏).

== Biography ==
Zhu was born in 1868 to an upper class Catholic family in Shanghai. His relatives had extensive business interests in the Shanghai area. His ancestral home in Qingpu County, Jiangsu Province. His ancestor Ma Tingluan (Chinese: 马廷鸾) was the prime minister of the Southern Song. His mother Ma Jianshu (马健淑) was the elder sister of Ma Xiangbo, founder of Fudan University.

In 1883 he studied Latin at the Dongjiadu Catholic Church (Chinese: 董家渡小修院) and then studied theology at Xujiahui Catholic Church (Chinese: 徐家汇大修院). He joined the Society of Jesus (the Jesuits) at age nineteen. He was ordained a priest at age twenty-nine. Zhu did domestic missionary work in China.

In 1926, Zhu and five other Chinese priests (Philippus Zhao Huaiyi, Melchior Sun Dezhen, Joseph Hu Ruoshan, Odoric Cheng Hede, and Aloysius Chen Guodi) were consecrated in Rome and became the first Chinese Catholic Bishops in modern times. The Holy See framed these consecrations as an important moment for indigenizing the Catholic Church. After leaving Rome, the new bishops toured Italy, France, Belgium, and Holland where crowds of local European Catholics greeted them.

Zhu was the Vicar Apostolic of Haimen, which had the biggest Catholic population of any of the territories for these six.

The Propaganda Fide believed that Zhu's upper class background would help him obtain respect from Chinese civil authorities.

He returned to China in March 1927 and founded Xilei Middle School (Chinese: 天主教锡类中学) that same year.

During the Second Sino-Japanese War, he actively raised funds to support the fight against the Empire of Japan.

In 1946 the Apostolic Vicariate of Haimen was promoted to Diocese.

At the beginning of 1949, he lived in Shanghai. He returned to Haimen in 1955. In 1958 Matthew Yu Chengcai was proposed as the new bishop of the Roman Catholic Diocese of Haimen, Zhu reported the result to the Holy See. On January 15, 1959, Zhu was labeled as a rightist by the Communist government. Zhu was placed under house arrest. On November 15, 1959, Matthew Yu Chengcai was consecrated as bishop of the Roman Catholic Diocese of Haimen in Nanjing, but it was not recognized by the Holy See.

Zhu died in 1960. He was buried in the Tomb of Yuangongsuo (Chinese: 袁公所墓地). In 1966, Mao Zedong launched the Cultural Revolution, his tomb was completely destroyed by the Red Guards. He was rehabilitated on May 15, 1980.

Catholic Church titles
Previous: New position	Bishop of the Apostolic Vicariate of Haimen (Diocese of Haimen after 1946); 1926-1960	Next: Mark Yuan Wen-zai
