= Aloysius Chen Guodi =

Chinese Catholic priest and bishop

- Bishop of the Apostolic Vicariate of Fenyang
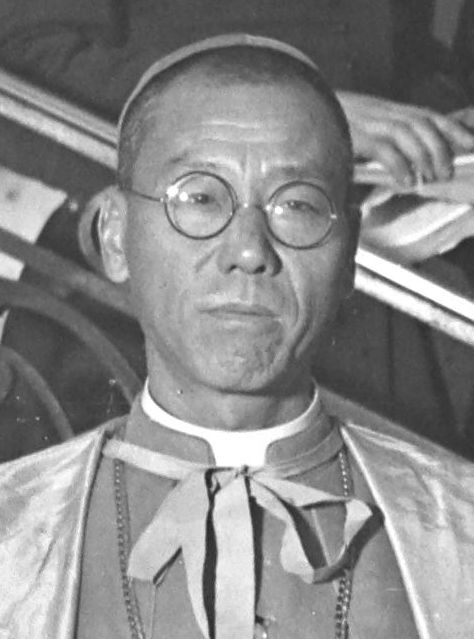
- Aloysius Chen Guodi in December 1926.
- Church: Cathedral in Fenyang
- Archdiocese: Roman Catholic Archdiocese of Taiyuan
- Diocese: Roman Catholic Diocese of Fenyang
- Installed: 10 May 1926
- Term ended: 9 March 1930
- Predecessor: Position established
- Successor: Francis Liu Jinwen

Orders
- Ordination: 13 March 1903
- Consecration: 28 October 1926 by Pope Pius XI

Personal details
- Born: November 7, 1875 Changzhi, Shanxi, Qing Empire
- Died: March 9, 1930 (aged 54) Fenyang, Shanxi, Republic of China
- Denomination: Roman Catholic

Aloysius Chen Guodi (simplified Chinese: 陈国砥; traditional Chinese: 陳國砥; pinyin: Chén Guódǐ; 7 November 1875 - 9 March 1930) was a Chinese Catholic priest and Bishop of the Roman Catholic Diocese of Fenyang from 1926 until his death in 1930.

== Biography ==
Chen was born in Anyangcun, Shanxi in 1875. He entered the Franciscans in 1896 in a village named Dong'ergou (洞儿沟). He was ordained a priest on March 13, 1903.

After the Boxer Rebellion, Chen was tasked with investigating the situation of Catholics in Shanxi.

In Shanxi, Chen worked as secretary to two Italian bishops and taught in Taiyun seminary. In addition, he led a Catholic middle school in the city. This was the only Catholic middle school in Shanxi at that time. He was appointed apostolic vicar by Fenyang on May 10, 1926, and was consecrated by Pope Pius XI on October 28, 1926. When Chen and five other Chinese priests (Philippus Zhao Huaiyi, Simon Zhu Kaimin, Odoric Cheng Hede, Melchior Sun De-zhen, and Joseph Hu Ruoshan) were consecrated in Rome, they became the first Chinese Catholic Bishops in modern times.

As a bishop, he was the apostolic vicar of Fenyang and focused on developing vocations to the priesthood from Chinese.

He died in 1930.

Catholic Church titles
Previous: Position established	Bishop of the Apostolic Vicariate of Fenyang; 1926–1930	Next: Francis Liu Jinwen
