= November 1926 =

Month of 1926

<<	November 1926					>>
Su	Mo	Tu	We	Th	Fr	Sa
	1	2	3	4	5	6
7	8	9	10	11	12	13
14	15	16	17	18	19	20
21	22	23	24	25	26	27
28	29	30

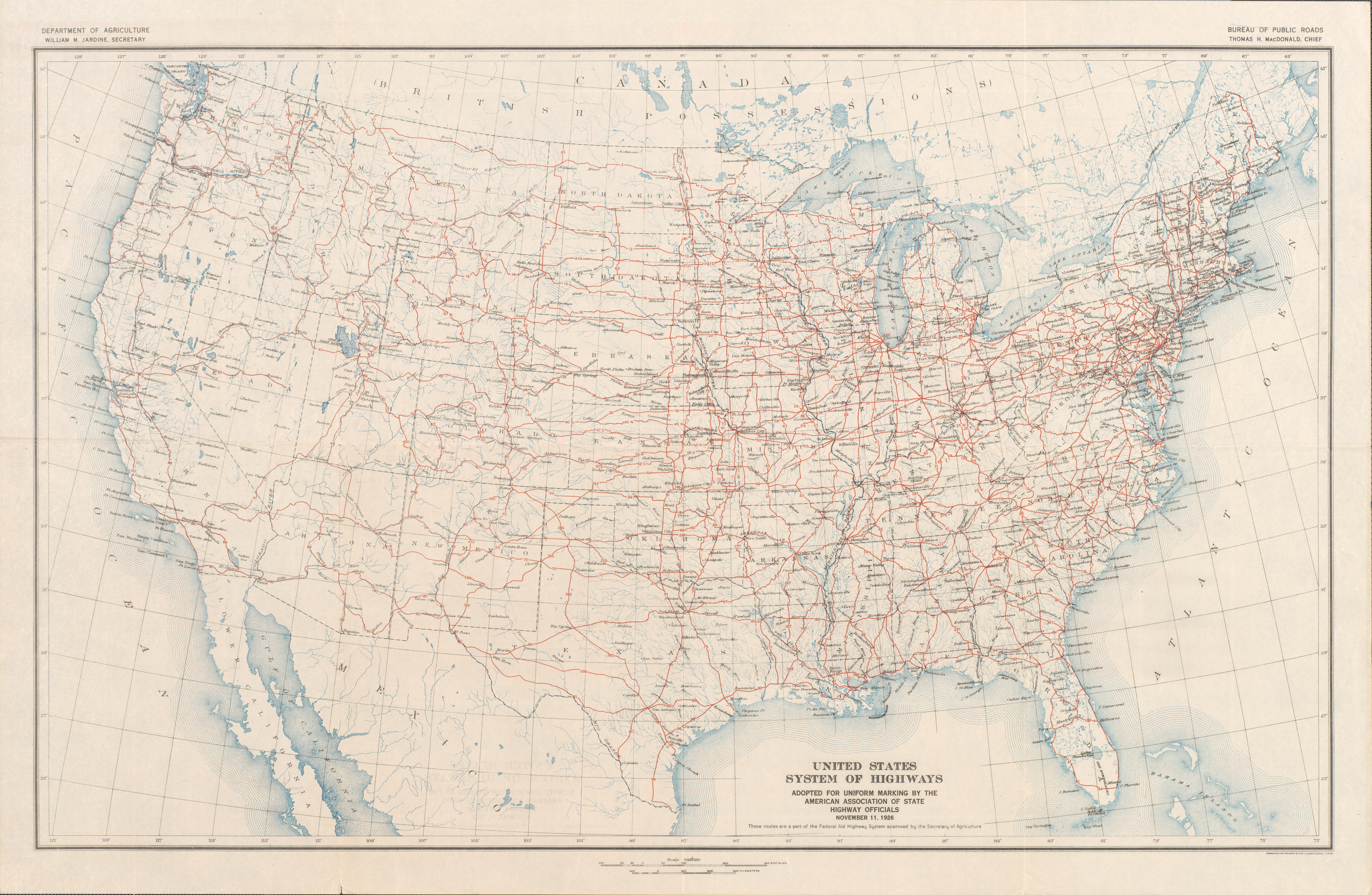
November 11, 1926: Uniform U.S. Highway System approved

November 15, 1926: NBC Radio Network goes on the air

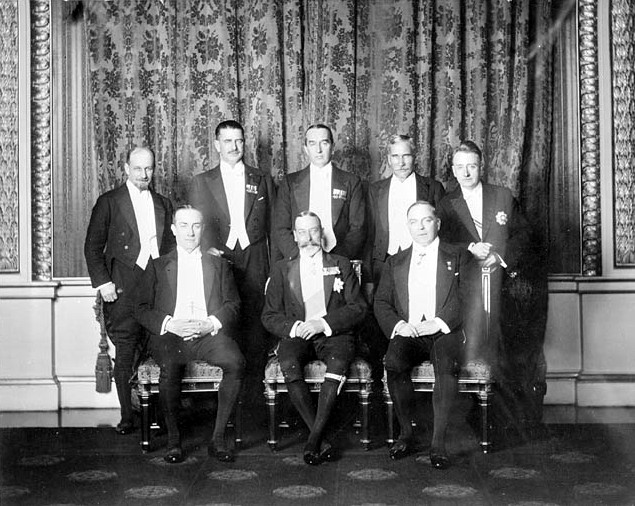
November 15, 1926: British Empire's prime ministers conclude the Imperial Conference approving the Balfour Declaration for a Jewish homeland in Palestine

The following events occurred in November 1926:

== November 1, 1926 (Monday) ==
- American Telephone & Telegraph Company (AT&T) departed the radio industry as it completed the sale of its short-lived subsidiary, Broadcasting Company of America (BCA), including its network of 19 stations and its flagship station in New York City, WEAF, to radio manufacturer RCA, the Radio Corporation of America, for one million dollars.
- The John Colton play The Shanghai Gesture opened on Broadway.
- Born:
  - Benjamin Hoskins Paddock, American bank robber and con man; in Sheboygan, Wisconsin (d. 1998)

== November 2, 1926 (Tuesday) ==
- Midterm elections were held for all 435 seats of the U.S. House of Representatives, as well as for 32 of the 96 seats in the United States Senate. The Republican Party retained a narrow majority of in the Senate as its share dropped from 56—39 over the Democrats, to a 49—46 lead. In the House, the Republicans' 246—183 majority dropped to 238—194.
- French pediatrician Gaston Variot warned young women not to dance the Charleston, because its "sudden wrenching movements" were "likely to produce internal conditions inimical to the proper conditions of childbirth."
- Died:
  - John Le Hay (stage name for John Mackway Healy), 72, English baritone opera singer and comedian, died the day after having been struck by a car in London. Le Hay had been appearing at the Lyceum Theatre, where he had been appearing in the play The Padre.

== November 3, 1926 (Wednesday) ==
- The collapse of an iron mine killed 51 people in Ishpeming, Michigan in what remains the deadliest industrial disaster in Michigan's history. The underground section of the Cleveland-Cliffs Iron Company mine had been excavated beneath a swamp, whose waters, along with mud and sand, then drained into the mine shaft rushed into the tunnels and drowned those who survived the initial blast and the debris from the cave-in.
- Khelil Bouhageb took office as the new Prime Minister of Tunisia by the Bey of Tunis, Muhammad VI al-Habib, dismissed his predecessor, two weeks after the October 20 death of the previous premier, Mustapha Dinguizli.
- The play Yellow Sands opened on London's West End at the Haymarket Theatre for the first of 610 performances.
- The Play's the Thing, a comedy adapted by P. G. Wodehouse from Ferenc Molnár's 1924 Hungarian play Játék a Kastélyban, had its first of 313 performances on Broadway, premiering at Henry Miller's Theatre.
- An attempt by three prisoners to escape from New York City's Tombs Prison ended with the deaths of five people (including the three escapees who all shot themselves before they could be captured). Hyman Amberg, Michael "Red" McKenna and Robert Berg had come into possession of pistols that had been smuggled in from outside along with "a few hundred rounds of ammunition", and had been escorted as a group to the prison infirmary when they feigned an illness. The group killed Warden Peter J. Mallon and a guard, Jeremiah Murphy, then escaped the building, but found themselves unable to escape the prison yard. In the gunfight that followed between the prisoners traded shots with police sharpshooters who had fired from windows of the Conklin Building that overlooked The Tombs.
- Born:
  - Valdas Adamkus, President of Lithuania 1998 to 2003, and 2005 to 2009; as Voldemaras Adamkavičius in Kaunas (alive in 2026)
  - Della Roy, American ceramics and materials researcher, known for her discoveries in radioactive waste disposal and suses of coral, namesake for the rare natural mineral dellaite (Ca_{6}(Si_{2}O_{7})(SiO_{4})(OH)_{2}); in Merrill, Oregon (d. 2021)
- Died:
  - Annie Oakley, 66, American sharpshooter and trick shot artist

== November 4, 1926 (Thursday) ==
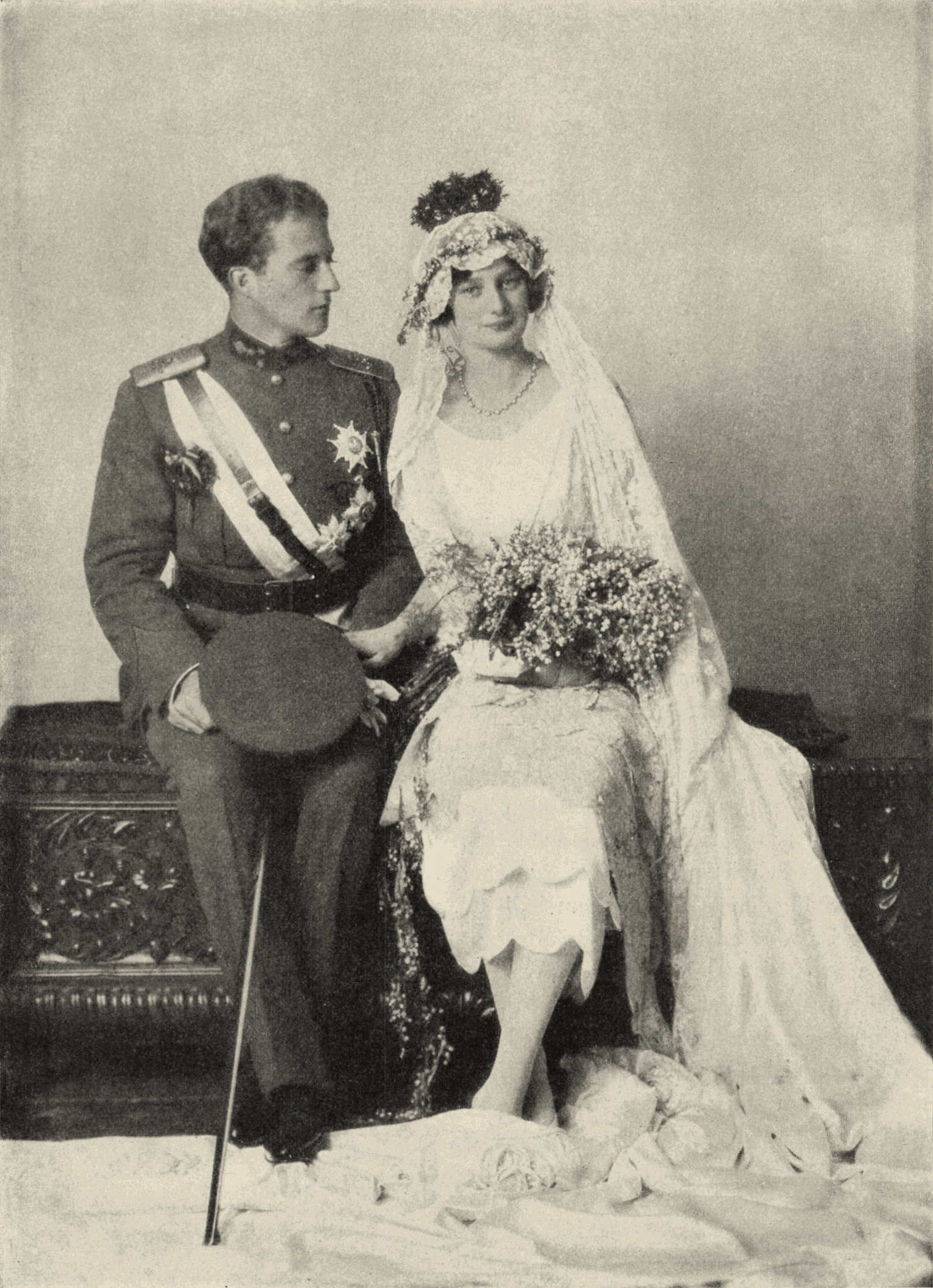
Leopold and Astrid

- Prince Leopold of Belgium, son of King Albert I and heir apparent to the throne, married Princess Astrid of Sweden, the niece of Sweden's King Gustaf V, in Stockholm. Stockholm Mayor Carl Lindhagen presided over the civil ceremony.
- The Netherlands-based discount department store chain HEMA (Hollandsche Eenheidsprijzen Maatschappij Amsterdam) opened its first location, with a store in Amsterdam. In its 100th year, HEMA would have more than 750 stores in the Netherlands, Belgium, France, and three other European nations.
- George W. English resigned as a United States federal judge before his impeachment trial proceedings could begin. English wrote in his resignation letter to President Coolidge that, while he believed he had properly carried out his duties as a U.S. District Judge, "I have come to the conclusion on account of the impeachment proceedings instituted against me, regardless of the final result thereof, that my usefulness as a Judge has been seriously impaired. I, therefore, feel that it is my patriotic duty to resign and let some one who is in nowise hampered be appointed to discharge the duties of the office."
- The comet 32P/Comas Solà, which orbits the Sun every 9.7 years, was discovered by Spanish astronomer Josep Comas Solà from the Fabra Observatory in Barcelona.
- Born:
  - Carlos "Patato" Valdes, Cuban conga drum player and entertainer; in Havana (d. 2007)
- Died:
  - Caroline Hewins, 80, American librarian known for her promotion of children's library services across the United States during the 19th century
  - Albin Egger-Lienz, 58, Austrian painter

== November 5, 1926 (Friday) ==
- Lithuania's parliament, the Seimas, voted to ratify the Soviet–Lithuanian Non-Aggression Pact that had been signed on September 28.
- Talks reopened in Britain between the government and the Miners' Federation to end the coal miners' lockout as it dragged into its seventh month.
- Born:
  - John Berger, English art critic known for writing Ways of Seeing; in London (d. 2017)
  - Purificação Araújo, Portuguese obstetrician and gynecologist known as "The Mother of Family Planning" in Portugal; in Lisbon (d. 2026)
  - Trần Kim Phượng, the last ambassador from South Vietnam to the United States, serving 1972 to 1975; in Hanoi, French Indochina (d. 2004)

== November 6, 1926 (Saturday) ==
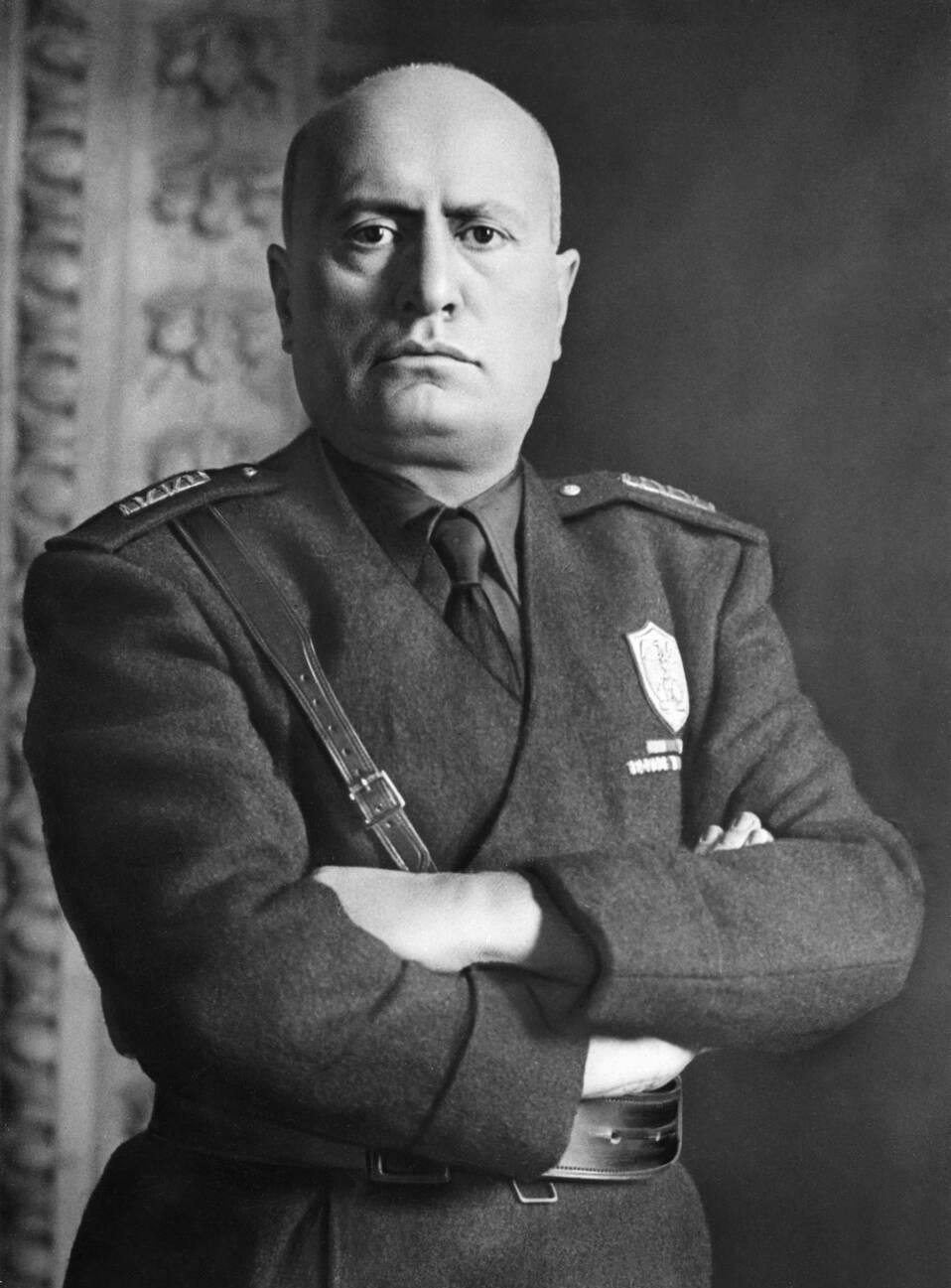
Mussolini

- A new, far-reaching police law was enacted in Italy by decree of the Cabinet Council, giving the government extensive powers of confinement and extending its power to dissolve political and cultural organizations. A new deportation law allowed for persons to be restricted to certain localities within Italy for light offenses or exiled to penal colonies for more serious ones. Benito Mussolini also reclaimed the Italian Minister of the Interior position for himself, and Italo Balbo was appointed undersecretary for the Air Ministry.
- Born:
  - Frank Carson, Northern Irish comedian; in Belfast (d. 2012).
  - Jack Gardner, 52, British heavyweight boxer who held the title of European champion (March–November 1951) and British champion (1950-1952); in Market Harborough, Leicestershire (died from a brain tumor, 1978)
- Died:
  - Carl Swartz, 68, Prime Minister of Sweden from March to October 1917 and Finance Minister 1906-1911

== November 7, 1926 (Sunday) ==
- Voting was held in Greece for all 286 seats of the Hellenic Parliament. The Liberal Union won 108 seats for a plurality, but 36 short of the required 144 needed for a majority.
- In Poland, Marshal Józef Piłsudski decreed a press gag law, forbidding the publication of news that could cause a public demonstration, news or rumors that ridiculed or criticized government officials and judges, and matter considered by government officials to be derogatory. Government officials were empowered to impose fines or jail sentences without a court hearing.

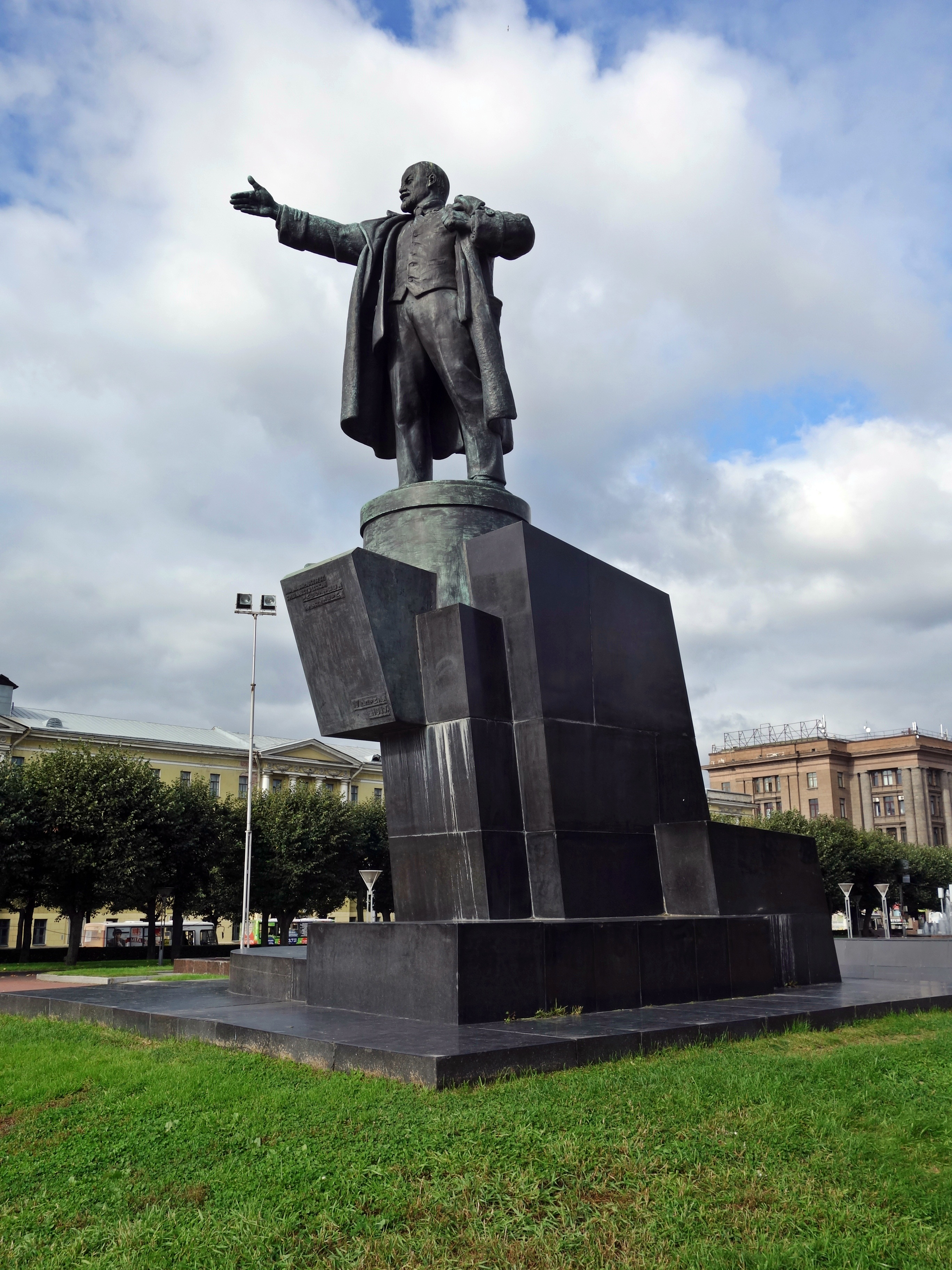
The Lenin statue

- In ceremonies for the ninth anniversary of the October Revolution that established the Soviet Union, what is now one of the few remaining statues of Vladimir Lenin was erected at the Finland Station in Leningrad (now Saint Petersburg), to commemorate his triumphant return to Russia on April 16, 1917, to end his exile in Switzerland.
- Born:
  - Joan Sutherland, Australian opera soprano and 1961 Grammy Award winner; in Sydney (d. 2010)
- Died:
  - Tom Forman, 33, American actor and director, committed suicide by shooting himself in the chest.

== November 8, 1926 (Monday) ==
- Elections were held in British India for the Madras Legislative Council, a 127-member advisory body representing the 20 million residents of the Madras Presidency, of whom 98 were selected by voters. While the Legislative Council could pass laws for the predominantly Tamil language speaking residents of the Madras province (now the Tamil Nadu state), and the leader of the largest party could form a provincial cabinet as the First Minister, the legislation could be vetoed by the British Governor and by the Governor-General. The Swaraj Party, led by S. Srinivasa Iyengar won more seats (41) than the Justice Party led by First Minister Panaganti Ramarayaningar (21).
- The George Gershwin musical Oh, Kay!, which introduced the popular song "Someone to Watch Over Me", opened on Broadway at the Imperial Theatre for the first of 256 performances.
- Cypriot association football club APOEL FC is founded in Nicosia.
- Born:
  - Darleane C. Hoffman, American nuclear chemist; in Terril, Iowa (d. 2025)
  - Ira Millstein, American antitrust defense lawyer known for more than 70 years of practice for the mega-firm Weil, Gotshal & Manges (d. 2024)
  - Lyudmila Arinina, Soviet Russian film and TV actress known for An Almost Funny Story (1977); in Sinodskoye, Saratov Governorate, Russian SFSR (d. 2026)
- Died:
  - James K. Hackett, 57, American stage and silent film actor, known for the title role in 1913 feature film The Prisoner of Zenda

== November 9, 1926 (Tuesday) ==
- All 123 opposition party members in the 535-seat Italian parliament lost their seats, and warrants were issued for their arrest. The expulsion came in retaliation for the participation of the deputies in the "Aventine Secession", a boycott of participation in the Fascist-dominated Parliament that had taken place on June 27, 1924. The group was from seven different political parties, which were in the minority after the passage of a law that guaranteed two-thirds representation for whichever party had won a plurality of seats provided they had at least 25 percent of the vote. The new law deprived them of parliamentary immunity. Antonio Gramsci of the dissolved Communist Party of Italy was arrested in Rome and imprisoned in the Regina Coeli.
- An F4 tornado struck the small town of La Plata, Maryland, destroying the town's elementary school and killing 14 students and teachers, as well as three other people in town.
- Paul Hindemith's opera Cardillac was given its first performance, making its debut at the Staatsoper in Dresden.
- Born:
  - Vicente Aranda, Spanish film director and producer known for Juana la Loca (2001) and El Lute; in Barcelona (d. 2015)
  - Johnny Beattie, Scottish actor and stand-up comedian; in Govan, Glasgow (d. 2020)

== November 10, 1926 (Wednesday) ==
- Princeton University severed athletic relations with Harvard, with Princeton's Board of Athletic Control voting unanimously to no longer participate in any further sports competitions between the two Ivy League universities. A formal letter from Princeton explained, "We have been forced to the conviction that it is at present impossible to expect in athletic competition with Harvard that spirit of cordial good will between the undergraduate bodies of the two universities which should characterize college sports."
- Born: Zdzisław Pawlak, Polish mathematician and computer science theoretician, known for the Pawlak flow graphs; in Łódź (d. 2006)
- Died: Joseph Schwarz, 46, Russian-born German operatic baritone for the Berlin Civic Opera, died while undergoing surgery for a kidney ailment; in Riga

== November 11, 1926 (Thursday) ==
U.S. Highway System, predecessor to Interstate Highway System, inaugurated

- The United States Numbered Highway System, including U.S. Route 66, was established.
- The Nicaraguan Congress elected Adolfo Díaz as president.with 44 votes for Diaz and two votes for former president Carlos Solozano. Diaz was inaugurated on November 14 to succeed General Emilio Chamorro, who had resigned on October 30 and turned the presidency over to Sebastian Urira."
- U.S. President Calvin Coolidge dedicated the Liberty Memorial in Kansas City, Missouri. In his dedication speech, held on Armistice Day and the eighth anniversary of the end of World War One, President Coolidge declared that the U.S. would not join the World Court, nor abide by its decisions, unless the Senate changed its position. Coolidge's speech was witnessed by an audience of 175,000 people, "probably the greatest assemblage ever faced by a Chief Executive of the nation," and heard across the U.S. on a live radio broadcast.
- The Squall, a play written by Jean Bart had its premiere on Broadway at the 48th Street Theatre for the first of 443 performances.
- Born:
  - Maria Teresa de Filippis, Italian racing driver and the first woman to compete in a Formula One race, appearing in the 1958 Belgian Grand Prix on June 15, 1958; in Marigliano (d. 2016)

== November 12, 1926 (Friday) ==
- The leaders of striking mineworkers reached an agreement with the British government on the ending of the coal miners' dispute. The miners essentially gave in to the owners' demands, including that the workday be increased from seven hours to eight. Some 300,000 miners had already returned to work by this time through localized settlements.
- An uprising by the Partai Komunis Indonesia (PKI), a Communist and nationalist group in West Java in the Dutch East Indies (now Indonesia). The outbreak of violence prompted the Dutch Governor-General, Andries Cornelis Dirk de Graeff, to convene an emergency meeting of the Council of the Dutch East Indies for approval of an order for the arrest of thousands of PKI members and suspected sympathizers.
- The Rennibister Earth House, a former residence dating from the 5th century BC, was accidentally discovered in a farmyard in Scotland on the Mainland island of the Orkney archipelago, when the roof of a buried house collapsed under the weight of a threshing machine. Located between the villages of Finstown and Kirkwall, the former dwelling contained the skeletal remains of 18 people (six adults and 12 children) and ancient tools.
- A breakthrough came in the 10th month of the textile workers strike in Passaic, New Jersey, as one of the affected testile mills, Passaic Worsted Company became the first to reach an agreement with Local 1603 of the United Textile Workers of America.
- Near Marion, Illinois, the Shelton Brothers Gang used a Curtiss JN-4 biplane to try to bomb rival gangster Charles Birger's hideout, "Shady Rest", from the air. The bombs, each with 20 sticks of dynamite, only succeeded in blowing up a cock fighting pit on the farm.
- Born:
  - Robert Goff, Baron Goff of Chieveley, Scottish judge and Senior Lord of Appeal in Ordinary from 1996 to 1998, at the time the highest-ranking judicial officer in the United Kingdom; in Kinloch, Perthshire (d. 2016)
  - Taneko Suzuki, Japanese biochemist and nutritionist known for her development of edible foods from fish proteins; in Tokyo (d. 2020)
  - Eric Handley, British classical scholar known for translating the works of the Greek poet Menander (342 BC-290 BC); in Birmingham (d. 2013)
- Died:
  - Joseph Gurney Cannon, 90, United States politician, Speaker of the U.S. House of Representatives 1903 to 1911, died at his home in Danville, Illinois.
  - Gusztáv Léderer, 33, Hungarian serial killer, was hanged in prison after being convicted of the murder of Ferenc Kodelka, a butcher whose dismembered corpse was found in Lederer's home in Budapest.

== November 13, 1926 (Saturday) ==
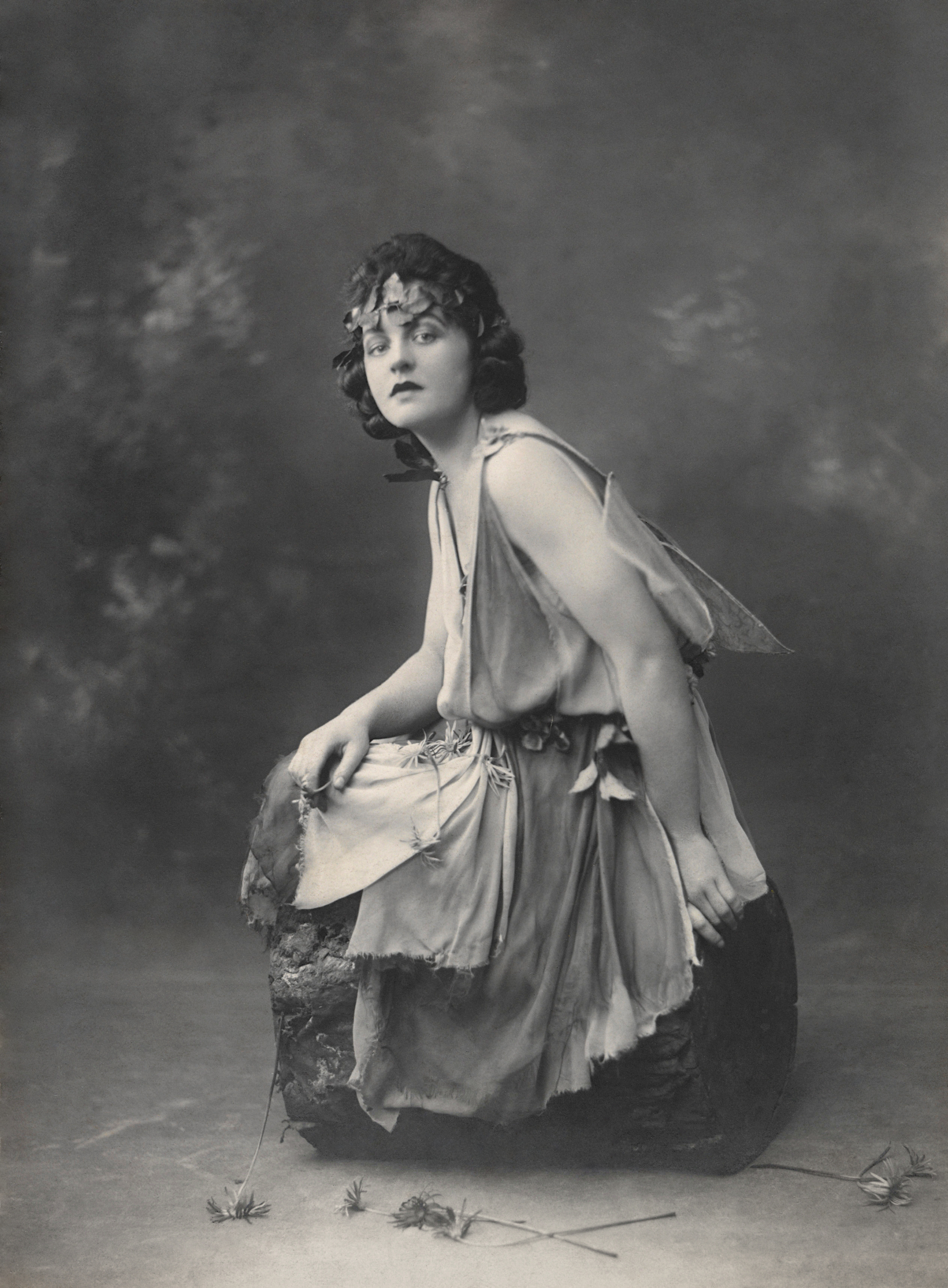
Author P. L. Travers

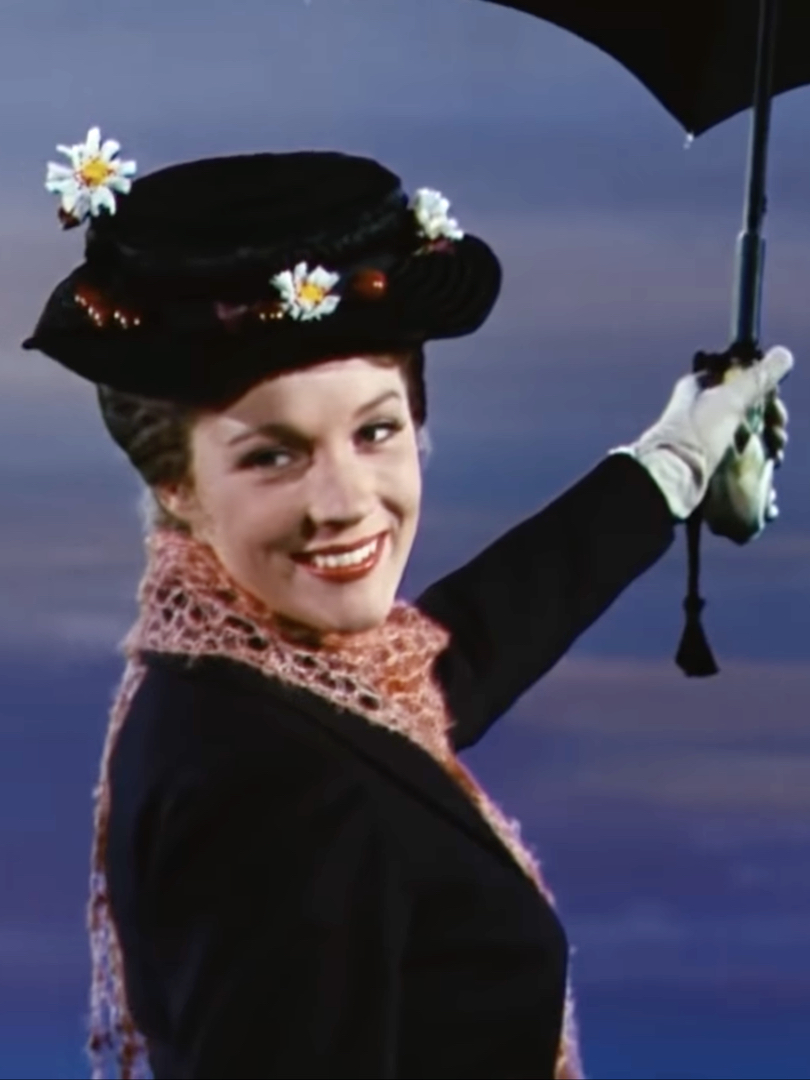
Mary Poppins

- A short story appeared in the New Zealand newspaper The Christchurch Sun about a nanny's day out, titled "Mary Poppins and the Match Man". The author, P. L. Travers, would later write a series of children's books about the Mary Poppins character that would be adapted into a musical film by Walt Disney in 1964.
- The former Crown Prince Wilhelm and his son were attacked by an angry mob at the Friedrichstraße when they got out of a car flying the Hohenzollern flag. Police intervened and held up traffic until they could ride away again.
- An Italian aviator, Major Mario de Bernardi, won the Schneider Trophy in Hampton Roads, Virginia.
- Born:
  - Max Mathews, American computer scientist and pioneer of computer music; in Columbus, Nebraska (d. 2011)
  - Joseph "Pep" Simek, American businessman and cook who co-created the Tombstone brand of frozen pizza; Ogema, Wisconsin (d. 2013)
  - Bernard Fein, American actor and television producer who was co-creator of the situation comedy Hogan's Heroes; in New York City (d. 1980)

== November 14, 1926 (Sunday) ==
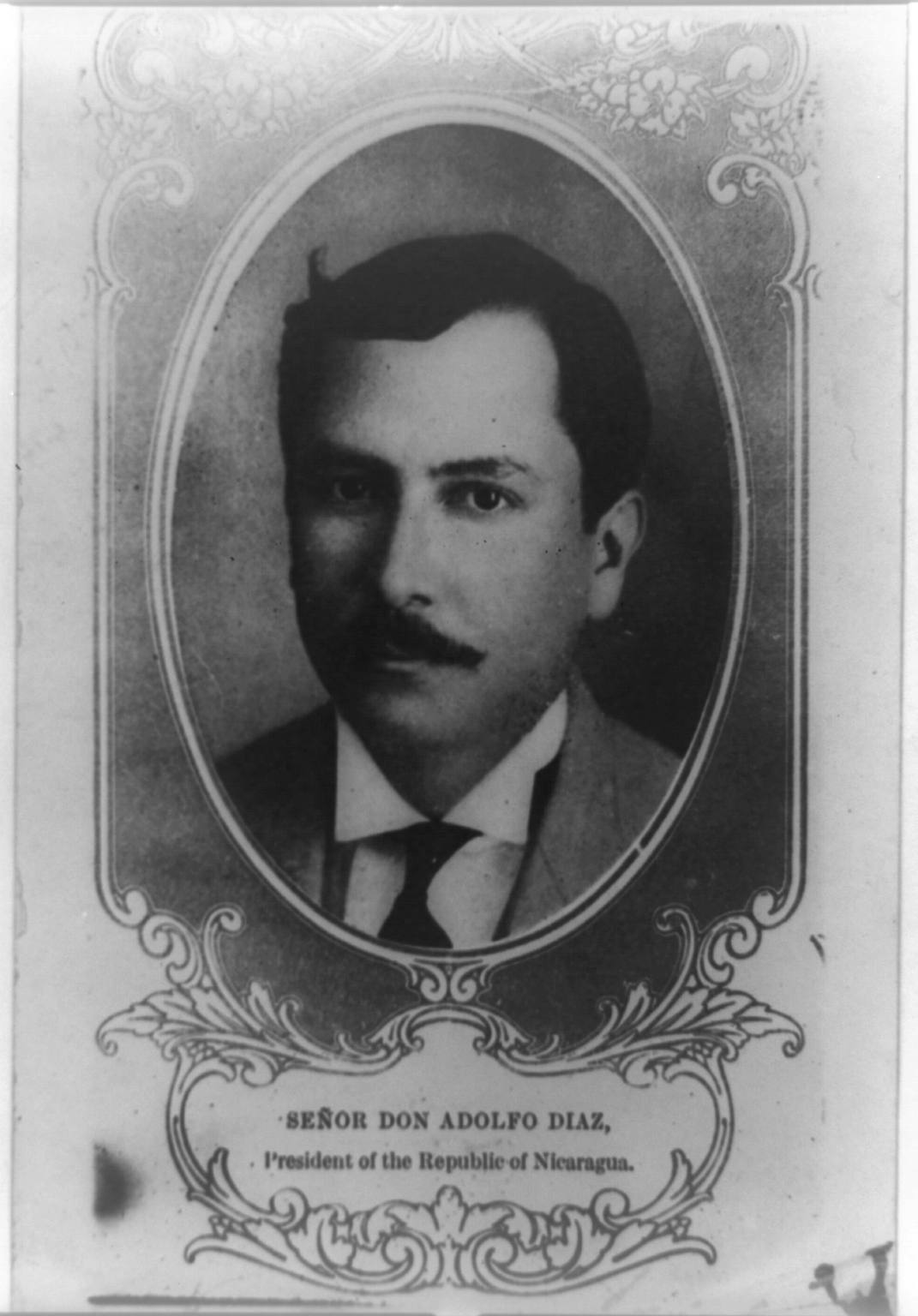
President Díaz

- Adolfo Díaz became President of Nicaragua for the second time. Diaz, elected by the Nicaraguan Congress on November 11, had previously served as president from 1911 to 1917.
- The Hellenic Football Federation, Greece's governing body for soccer football, was founded by the leagues of Athens, Piraeus and Macedonia, and would begin its 100th year in 2026.
- The three-act opera Der Golem, composed by Eugen d'Albert, with a German language libretto by Ferdinand Lion, premiering at the Oper Frankfurt.

== November 15, 1926 (Monday) ==
- The National Broadcasting Company (NBC) launched its NBC Radio Network at 8:00 in the evening with an inaugural broadcast on its flagship station in New York, WEAF, and to 21 other affiliates in its network.
- The Balfour Declaration, the United Kingdom's endorsement of the creation of a Jewish nation in the British mandate of Palestine, was unanimously approved by the Prime Ministers of the British Empire's members at the Imperial Conference.
- Washington Luís was inaugurated as the 13th President of Brazil after having been elected on March 1 to succeed Artur Bernardes.
- Born:
  - Vilma Rose Hunt, Australian-born American radiation biologist who discovered (in 1964) that the radioactive isotope Polonium-210 is present within tobacco and authored the report "Occupational Problems of Pregnant Women" in 1974 and A Brief History of Women Workers and Hazards in the Workplace in 1979; in Sydney, New South Wales (d. 2012)

== November 16, 1926 (Tuesday) ==
- General Óscar Carmona was installed as President of Portugal following a coup d'etat that had deposed President Manuel Gomes da Costa on July 9. Carmona would remain as the nominal president for more than 24 years until his death in 1951.
- Clarence "Taffy" Abel, a 26-year-old Ojibwe Native American who had played for the U.S. Olympic Ice Hockey team in the 1924 Winter Olympics, became the first American Indian player in the National Hockey League as he made his NHL debut for the New York Rangers at the Rangers' very first NHL game. Although he is sometimes described as having "broken the color barrier" in the NHL, he did not publicize his Native American ancestry at the time. Abel was "the only American born player on the team," in that all of his teammates had been born in Canada. The Rangers won their first NHL game in the season opener, defeating the Montreal Maroons 1 to 0, on a goal by Bill Cook on an assist by his brother, Frederick "Bun" Cook.
- Marshal Józef Piłsudski threatened to dissolve the Polish parliament if radicals did not stop their attacks on the press gag law.
- Born:
  - Nasir Hussain, Indian Bollywood film director and producer known for creating the first masala film, Yaadon Ki Baaraat (1973), as well as the musical romance Qayamat Se Qayamat Tak (1988); in Bhopal princely state (now Madhya Pradesh) (d. 2002)

== November 17, 1926 (Wednesday) ==
- Mario de Bernardi achieved a speed of 258.874 miles per hour in his Macchi M.39, a new seaplane record.
- The new Chicago Black Hawks ice hockey team played their first National Hockey League Game, hosting the Toronto St. Patricks (now the Toronto Maple Leafs) and winning 4 to 1 before 7,000 fans at the Chicago Coliseum, with the first Black Hawks goal coming from George Hay.
- Died:
  - George Sterling, 66, American poet and Allen Upward, 63, British novelist, both committed suicide in separate incidents. Sterling was found dead in his hotel room at San Francisco's Bohemian Club, having taken a dose from a vial of cyanide, while Upward had shot himself in the heart at his home in the town of Wimborne Minster in Dorset.

== November 18, 1926 (Thursday) ==
- Irish writer and playwright George Bernard Shaw refused the £7,000 in prize money (equivalent to $40,000 at the time) awarded to him for the 1925 Nobel Prize in Literature, sending a letter to the Swedish Ministry in London for deliver to the Swedish Academy, commenting that "the prize is like a lifebelt thrown to a swimmer who has already reached shore." Tired of the standoff, Shaw declared, "I can forgive Alfred Nobel for having invented dynamite, but only a fiend in human form could have invented the Nobel Prize!"
- Pope Pius XI issued the encyclical Iniquis afflictisque, condemning the persecution of the clergy of the Roman Catholic Church in Mexico.
- Toyoda Automatic Loom Works, Ltd., the forerunner of the Toyota Motor Corporation that would begin manufacturing of automobiles in 1937, was founded by inventor Sakichi Toyoda to market his improvement on textile weaving, the automatic loom.
- The Detroit Cougars (who would later become the Detroit Red Wings, one of the three new U.S. franchises of the National Hockey League (in addition to the New York Rangers and the Chicago Black Hawks) played their first NHL game, losing 2 to 0 to the Boston Bruins in a game before 6,000 fans at their home ice, the Border Cities Arena in Windsor, Ontario.
- American inventor Gaylord Wilshire, who had promoted the "I-ON-A-CO" an electromagnetic belt of his own invention, which he promised "may bring complete relief" from pain, relieve eczema overnight, or relieve neuritis in 10 minutes, ran a full-page advertisement in the Los Angeles Daily Times, challenging the California medical profession to investigate him. The challenge would be responded to by the investigative director of the American Medical Association, Arthur J. Cramp, who made a critical analysis of the belt and published his results that concluded that the I-ON-A-CO belt was quackery and that it did not have any effect, other than psychological, on the maladies that it promised to cure.
- Born:
  - Roy Sievers, U.S. baseball player, 1949 American League Rookie of the Year, and 1957 AL home run and RBI leader; in St. Louis (d. 2017)

== November 19, 1926 (Friday) ==
- Nine people were killed in a railway accident in Yorkshire in England, between Parkgate and Rawmarsh when an express train was struck by a derailing freight car on an adjacent track.
- The Paramount Theatre opened in New York City.
- Born:
  - Jeane Kirkpatrick, U.S. Ambassador to the United Nations, 1981 to 1985; as Jeane Duane Jordan in Duncan, Oklahoma (d. 2006)
- Died:
  - Clement Shorter, 69, British journalist, columnist and editor known for founding the monthly society magazine The Tatler (now TATLER) in 1901, as well as the newspapers The Sketch (1893-1959), The Sphere (1900-1964)
  - Thomas Cusack, 68, Irish-born American pioneer in billboard advertising, and former member of Congress (1899-1901) for Illinois

== November 20, 1926 (Saturday) ==
- The Balfour Declaration was announced to the public at the Imperial Conference in London. Canada, Australia, New Zealand, South Africa and Newfoundland would become self-governing dominions.
- The Irish Free State declared a national state of emergency due to Republican Army raids around the country.
- The Stanford University Cardinals college football team closed their season unbeaten and untied (9-0-0) with a 41 to 6 win over the host University of California, before a crowd of 80,000 in Memorial Stadium to be one of only two major teams (the other one being the University of Alabama (9-0-0) to finish the season unbeaten. Stanford became the first winner of the Rissman Trophy, awarded to the college football team with the highest ranking under the Dickinson System.
- Born:
  - John Gardner, British mystery and spy novelist known for 14 James Bond continuation novels; in Seaton Delaval, Northumberland (d. 2007)
  - Édouard Leclerc, French grocery entrepreneur who founded the E.Leclerc supermarket chain in 1949, a business that had almost 700 stores in Europe by the time of his death; in Landerneau, Finistère département (d. 2012)

== November 21, 1926 (Sunday) ==
- Chiang Kai-shek told the Associated Press that the revolution in China would not end until the unequal treaties with foreign powers were all abolished.
- The Kimes–Terrill Gang of bank robbers was reassembled as Ray Terrill led a raid on the jail in Sallisaw, Oklahoma, assisted by Herman Barker and Elmer Inman, and three other people, and freed Matthew Kimes, who had been arrested on August 27 after robbing two banks and killing a Sequoyah County sheriff's deputy.
- The silent film The Great Gatsby, the first to be based on the 1925 F. Scott Fitzgerald novel of the same name, was released. No copies exist of the original 80-minute film and it is considered lost, although the 60-second film trailer survives. The film would be remade in 1949, 1974, 2000 and 2013.
- 'Born:
  - Sister María Rosa Leggol, Honduran Franciscan Catholic nun and humanitarian who founded the Sociedad Amigos de los Niños (SAN) to educate orphan children; in Puerto Cortés (d. 2020)
- Died:
  - Joseph McKenna, 83, American jurist known for serving as an Associate Justice of the U.S. Supreme Court (1898-1925), the U.S. Attorney General (1897-1898) and a U.S. Congressman (1885-1892)

== November 22, 1926 (Monday) ==
- Fascist Italy's Border Militia (Milizia Confinaria) was founded by volunteers from Benito Mussolini's Blackshirts.
- Italian trade unionist Captain Giuseppe Giulietti, loyal to the Fascists but out of favour for his brand of syndicalism, was arrested in Genoa for purported embezzlement.
- The "Great White Train" of the Buy Australian Made campaign concluded its second and final run to promote purchase of local goods rather than imports. The train stopped in 38 different towns in the state of New South Wales after having commenced the run on August 25 over almost three months, having previously visited multiple towns in a six month period in 1925 and 1926.
- Born:
  - Lew Burdette, U.S. baseball player who was 1957 World Series MVP, 1956 ERA leader in the NL and the 1959 NL wins leader; in Nitro, West Virginia (d. 2007)
  - David West, Scottish British classical scholar; in Aberdeen (d. 2013)
  - Murtaza Ali Khan, Indian heir to the throne of the Nawab of Rampur as the son of the Nawab Raza Ali Khan, who ruled from 1930 until the abolition of the Rampur princely state in 1947, when it was merged into the state of Uttar Pradesh; at the Khasbagh Palace in Rampur (d. 1982)
- Died:
  - Darvish Khan, 54, Iranian classical musician, was killed in an accident when the horse-drawn carriage in which he was riding was hit by a truck.

== November 23, 1926 (Tuesday) ==
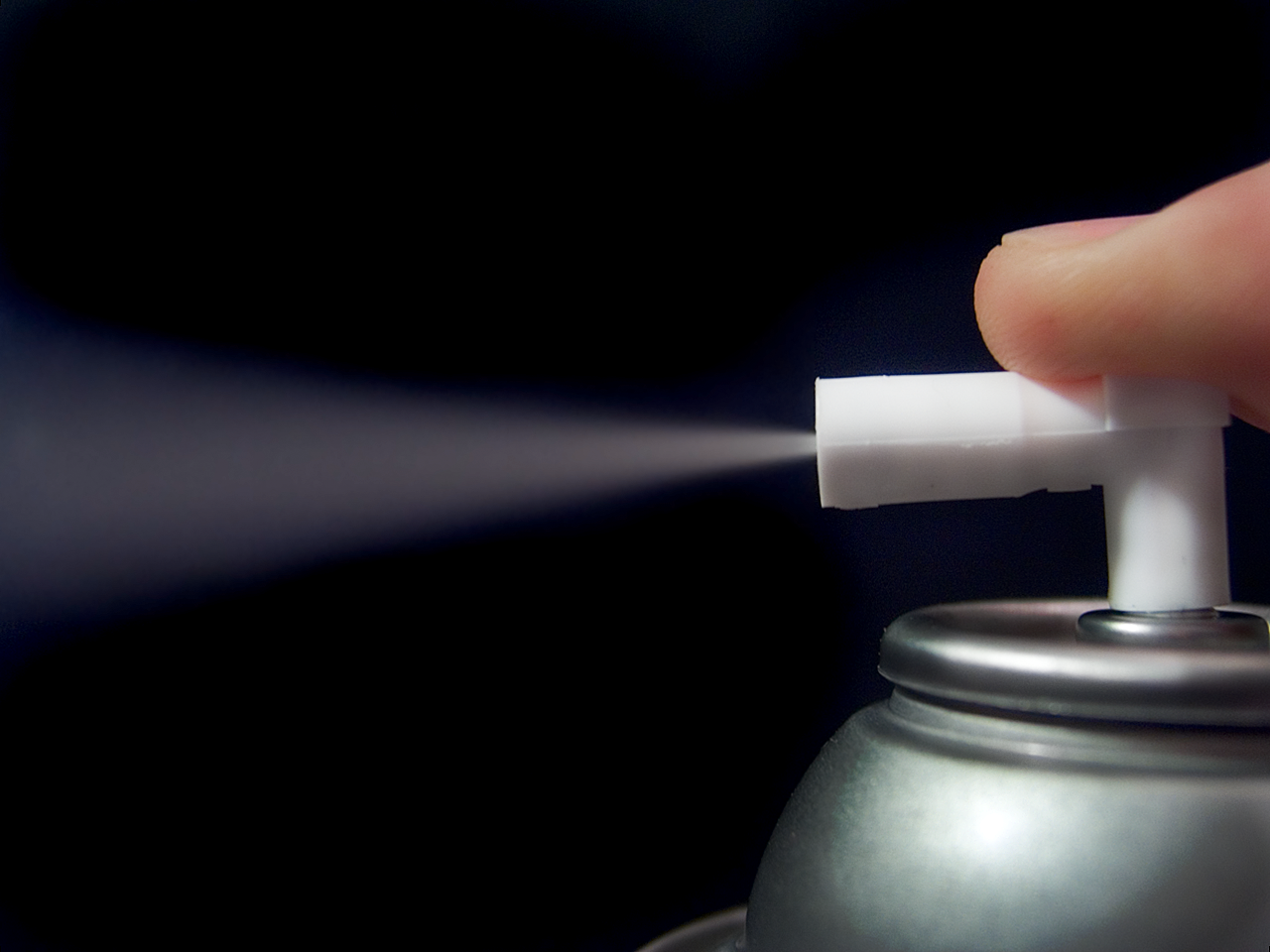
A method and means for atomizing or distribution of liquid or semi-liquid material."

- The first patent for the aerosol spray dispenser, used in spray cans, was issued to Norwegian chemical engineer Erik Rotheim, who received Norwegian patent No. 46613 in 1927 and U.S. patent 1,800,156 on April 7, 1931 for " Method and Means for the Atomizing or Distribution of Liquid or Semiliquid Materials".
- The hit film What Price Glory, adapted from a play of the same name by Maxwell Anderson and Laurence Stallings, was released by the Fox Studios. Although the 116-minute film was silent, it would be re-released on January 21, 1927, with the Movietone system and a soundtrack with synchronized sound effects and music. In all, What Price Glory had a box office of four million U.S. dollars, equivalent to more than $75,000,000 a century later.
- Born:
  - Sathya Sai Baba (Ratnakaram Sathyanarayana Raju), Indian guru and cult figure who was revered by his followers as claimed to be the Hindu Brahmin saint Sai Baba of Shirdi (1838-1918); in Puttaparthi, Madras Province, British India (d. 2011)
  - Lukas Vischer, Swiss Christian theologian; in Basel (d. 2008)
  - Trudy Haynes, the first African-American weather reporter, making her debut in 1963 for WXYZ-TV in Detroit, later the winner of an Emmy Award and two Lifetime Achievement Awards; in New York City (d. 2022)
  - R. L. Burnside, American blues musician; in Harmontown, Mississippi (d. 2005)

== November 24, 1926 (Wednesday) ==
- Queen Marie of Romania ended her visit to the United States and Canada, departing from New York aboard the SS Berengaria.
- In British India, Yagya Narayan Singh was crowned as the new Maharaja of the Kishangarh princely state, after his succession had been approved on November 16 by the Governor-General, Lord Halifax.
- William Walton's classical composition Siesta was given its first performance, premiering at Aeolian Hall in London. The piece would later become the score for the Frederick Ashton ballet Siesta— a Pas de deux in 1936.
- Born:
  - Tsung-Dao Lee, Chinese-born U.S. physicist and 1957 Nobel Prize laureate; in Shanghai (d. 2024)
  - Ramlal Siyag, Indian Hindu guru known for his promotion of the Siddha Yoga meditation and for counseling celebrities such as Brad Pitt and Angelina Jolie; in Palana, Bikaner princely state, British India, (now in Rajasthan state in India) (d. 2017)
  - Dinah Faust, German-born French TV and film actress and comedienne; in Berlin (d. 2023)
- Died:
  - Leonid Krasin, 56, Russian politician who served as the Soviet Ambassador to the United Kingdom, and People's Commissar for Foreign Trade, known for negotiating the 1921 Anglo-Soviet Trade Agreement, died suddenly from pernicious anemia.
  - Bayly Akroyd, 76, English first-class cricketer and Wimbledon tennis player

== November 25, 1926 (Thursday) ==
- Benito Mussolini created the Tribunale Speciale (Special Court) for the indictment and trial of political crimes under Fascist Italy's new Legge di Difesa dello Stato (State Defense Law), and reintroduced the death penalty to Italy for attempts on the life of the royal family or Head of State, acts of espionage or for incitement of civil war. The Italian secret police agency OVRA would be created to investigate and arrest potential political crime suspects.
- Italian political prisoner Antonio Gramsci was sent to the prison island of Ustica.
- Born:
  - Poul Anderson, American science fiction and fantasy author and seven-time Hugo Award winner known for Brain Wave (1954), Tau Zero (1970), A Midsummer Tempest (1974) and The Boat Of A Million Years (1989); in Bristol, Pennsylvania (d. 2001)
  - Ranganath Misra, Chief Justice of India from 1990 to 1991; in Banapur, Bihar and Orissa Province, British India (d. 2012)
  - Harry Landis (stage name for Hyman Londinsky), British stage, film and television actor known for EastEnders and Friday Night Dinner; in Stepney, London (d. 2022)
  - Anne Nicol Gaylor, American atheist and pro-choice activist, kknown for co-founding the Freedom from Religion Foundation; in Tomah, Wisconsin (d. 2015)
  - Rosalyn Drexler, American playwright, pop artist, author (using the pen name Julia Sorel), screenwriter and professional wrestler; in New York City (d. 2025)

== November 26, 1926 (Friday) ==
- Italy put its anti-striking law to use for the first time, fining 81 clothing workers in Gallarate 100 lira each for stopping work.
- King Ferdinand of Romania was reported to be gravely ill, sparking fears that a civil war might break out if he were to die as the heir to the throne, Michael, was five years old and Queen Marie was still on an ocean liner in the Atlantic. However, he recovered from his illness, dispelling rumors within the country that he had died.
- Boston mayor Malcolm E. Nichols married the twin sister of his late first wife.
- Born:
  - Rabi Ray, Indian politician and the Speaker of the Lok Sabha, India's national parliament, from 1989 to 1991; in Bhanaragarh, Bihar and Orissa Province, British India (now Odisha state in India) (d. 2017)
  - Herbert Freudenberger, German-born American psychologist who was the first to identify occupational burnout and chronic fatigue, author of Burn Out: The High Cost of High Achievement (Bantam, 1980); in Frankfurt, Germany (d. 1999)
  - Lt. Gen. Sven-Olof Olson, Chief of the Swedish Air Force (Flygvapenchef) from 1982 to 1988; in Oskarshamn (d. 2021)
  - Ed Williams, American comedian actor known for The Naked Gun series of spoof films; in San Jose, California (d. 2025)

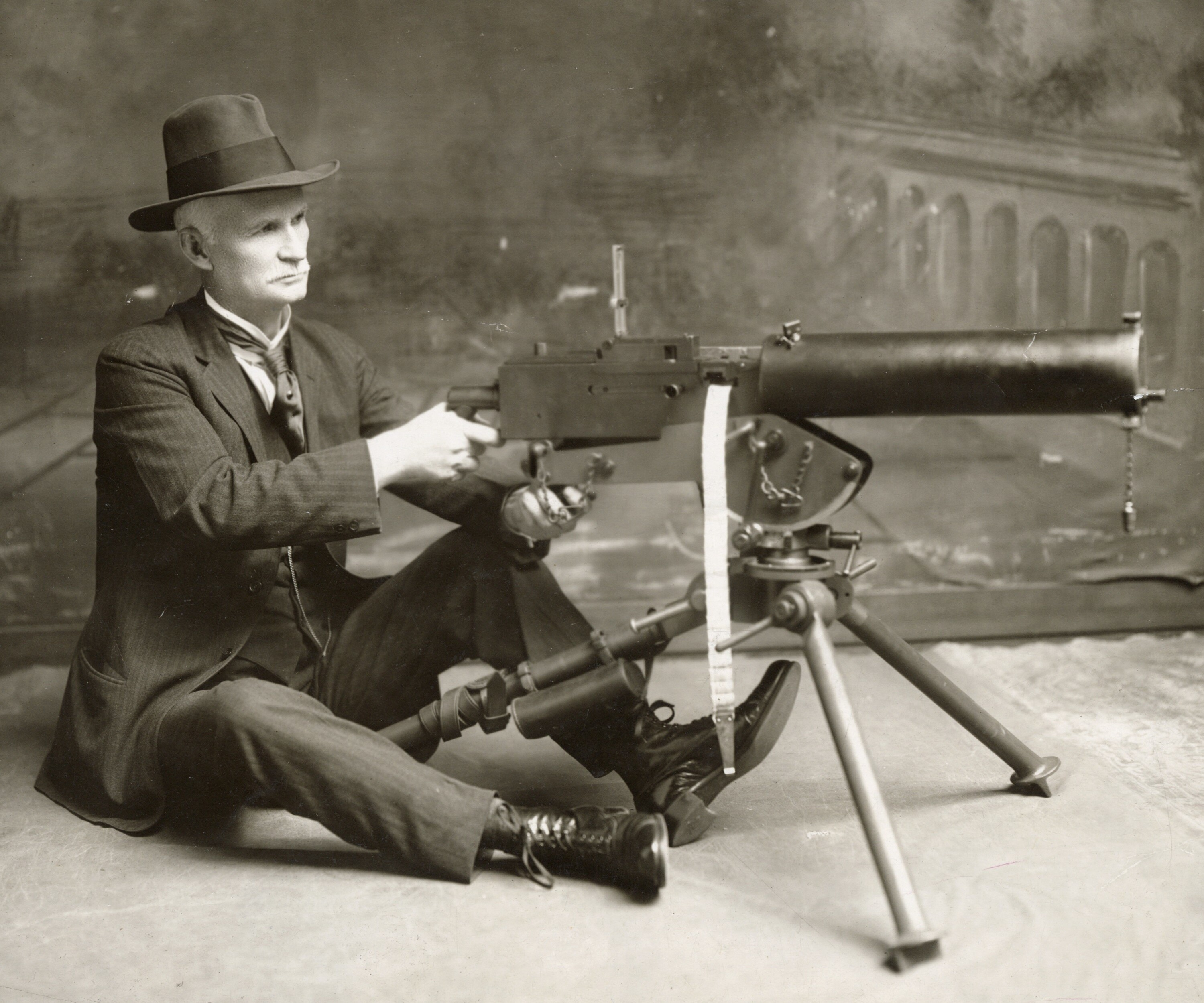
Browning with one of the machine guns he invented

- Died: John Browning, 71, American firearms designer with 128 patents for weapons, including the M1911 pistol, the M1917 Browning machine gun, and the M1919 Browning machine gun that were used for decades by the U.S. military.

== November 27, 1926 (Saturday) ==
- The Treaty of Tirana was signed between the Kingdom of Italy and the Albanian Republic, beginning a partial Italian protectorate over Albania. Under the terms of the 5-year " Treaty of Peace and Security", Italian Army officers supervised and trained the Albanian Army, neither nation would enter into political or military agreements that might harm the other, and although it stopped short of being a mutual defense treaty, it provided that "Anyone going against the existing Albanian status quo affairs will be seen as an enemy of both the Albanian and Italian states," a guarantee that Italy would intevene in any attempt to overthrow President Ahmed Muhtar Bey Zogolli, who would later be proclaimed King Zog I. Albanian Foreign Minister Hysen Vrioni signed on behalf of President Zogolli and Italy's ambassador Pompeo Aloisi signed on behalf of the Kingdom.
- The Béla Bartók-composed ballet The Miraculous Mandarin premiered at the Oper der Stadt Köln and, because its story took place in a house of prostitution, was perceived as being so immoral that it was banned by then-mayor Konrad Adenauer.
- The Philadelphia Quakers (7-2-0) defeated the New York Yankees (8-4-0), 13 to 6, to effectively win first place and the championship of the first American Football League, which had been launched in 1926 as a competitor to the existing National Football League. The meeting came two days after a Thanksgiving Day match in New York in which the Quakers beat the Yankees, 13-10.

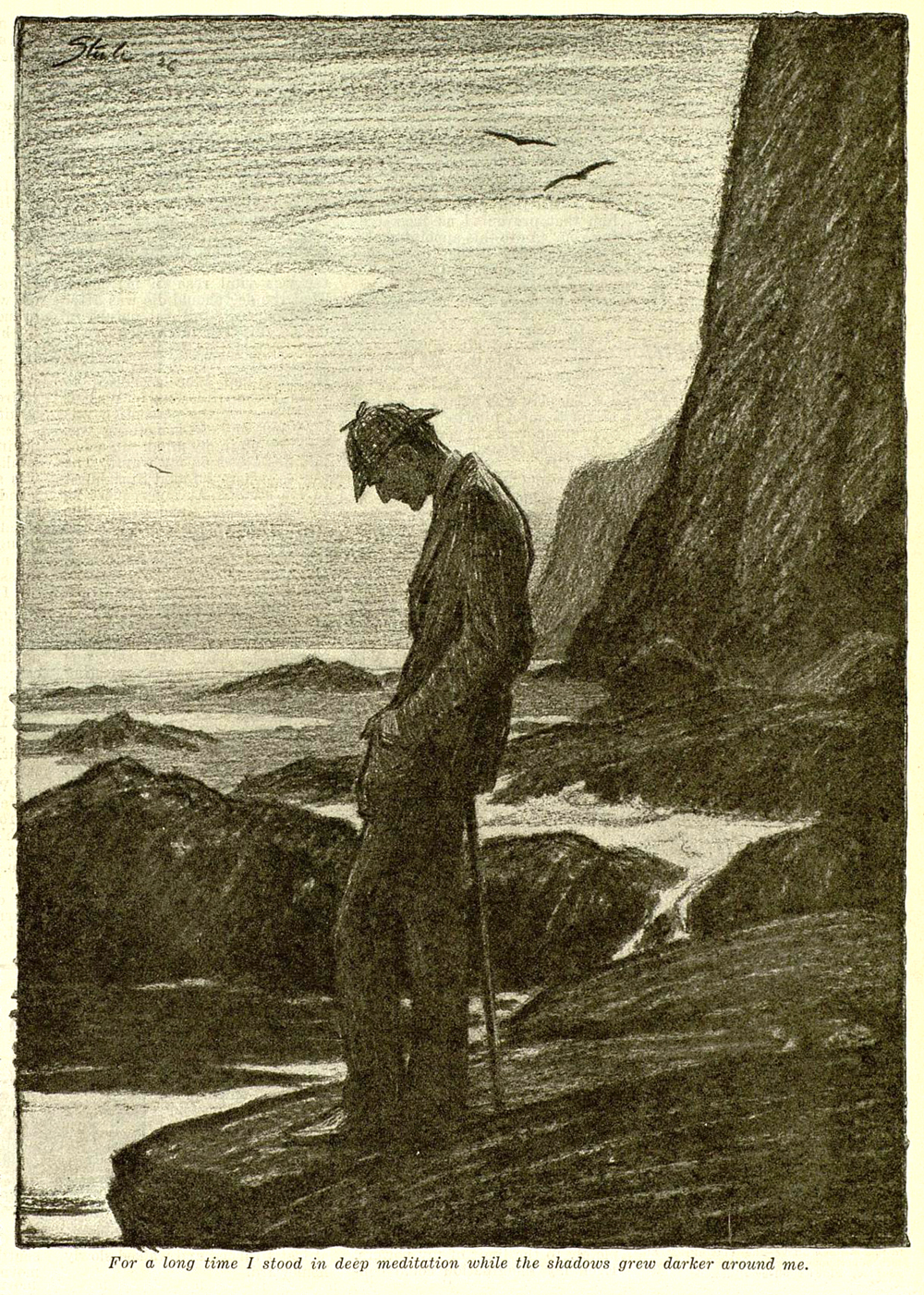
Sherlock Holmes ponders a mystery in retirement in "The Adventure of the Lion's Mane".

- The Sherlock Holmes short story "The Adventure of the Lion's Mane" by Sir Arthur Conan Doyle was published for the first time in Liberty magazine in the United States.
- The two major unbeaten and untied college football teams in the U.S., the Stanford Cardinals (9-0-0) and the Alabama Crimson Tide (9-0-0) were confirmed as the competitors in the 1927 Rose Bowl game, marking the first time that a postseason football contest would be played between the nation's two best teams.
- The Army–Navy Game in Chicago for the first, and only time, contested at Soldier Field before a record crown of 111,000 spectators, and ended in a 21–21 tie.
- Born: Chae Myung-shin, South Korean General who commanded the Republic of Korea forces Vietnam War from 1964 to 1973; in Koksan, Kōkai-dō province, Japanese Chōsen (now North Hwanghae Province in North Korea (d. 2013)

== November 28, 1926 (Sunday) ==
- Elections for president were held in Uruguay. Juan Campisteguy Oxcobi, of the ruling Colorado Party a former President of the Senate and later the Minister of the Interior narrowly defeated Luis Alberto de Herrera of the National Party, by a margin of 141,553 votes to 139,959. Campisteguy was inaugurated on March 1.
- Near the town of Serra Talhada in Brazil's Pernambuco state, bandit leader Virgulino Ferreira da Silva, alias "Lampião" and his band of almost "Cangaceiros" fought a gun battle with a 295-member regiment of Pernambuco's paramilitary police force, forcing their retreat and killing at least 10 of the soldiers.
- In fighting between German Communists and the right-wing Nazi Party and Reichsbanner members, following the death of Leonid Krasin, 13 people were injured and 60 arrested.
- Benito Mussolini restored the right among members of the Fascist Party to criticize government policies.
- Born:
  - Lawrence Turman, American film producer known for The Graduate (1967); in Los Angeles (d. 2023)
  - Eleanor R. Adair, American physiologist known for the first studies of the effect of microwave radiation on humans; in Arlington, Massachusetts (d. 2013)
- Died:
  - Nellie Constance Martyn, 39, Australian business magnate who became the director of The Steel Company of Australia upon the 1924 death of her father James Martyn, died of cancer.
  - Emma Brooke, 81, British novelist and feminist known for her "New Woman" novels, including A Superfluous Woman (1894)

== November 29, 1926 (Monday) ==
- Italian trade unionist Captain Giuseppe Giulietti, loyal to the Fascists but out of favour for his brand of syndicalism, was arrested in Genoa for purported embezzlement.
- Born: Dilhan Eryurt, Turkish astrophysicist; in İzmir (d. 2012)
- Died:
  - Harry Nicholls, 74, English actor and comedian popular in the Victorian era

== November 30, 1926 (Tuesday) ==
- The Desert Song, an operetta with music by Sigmund Romberg and lyrics by Oscar Hammerstein II, Otto Harbach and Frank Mandel, opened on Broadway at the Casino Theatre for the first of 471 performances.
- The Japan Rugby Football Union (JRFU), still the governing body of rugby union football in Japan, was founded.
- Born:
  - Andrew Schally, Polish-born American endocrinologist and co-recipient of the 1977 Nobel Prize in Physiology or Medicine for his discovery that the hypothalamus controls hormone production and release, and regulates other hormones; in Vilno (now Vilnius in Lithuania) (d. 2024)
  - Sathya Sai Baba, Indian guru; in Puttaparthi, Madras Province, British India (d. 2011)
  - R. L. Burnside, American blues musician; in Harmontown, Mississippi (d. 2005)
- Died: William H. Porter, 65, American banker and president of Chemical National Bank from 1903 to 1910
