= December 1926 =

Month of 1926

<<	December 1926					>>
Su	Mo	Tu	We	Th	Fr	Sa
			1	2	3	4
5	6	7	8	9	10	11
12	13	14	15	16	17	18
19	20	21	22	23	24	25
26	27	28	29	30	31

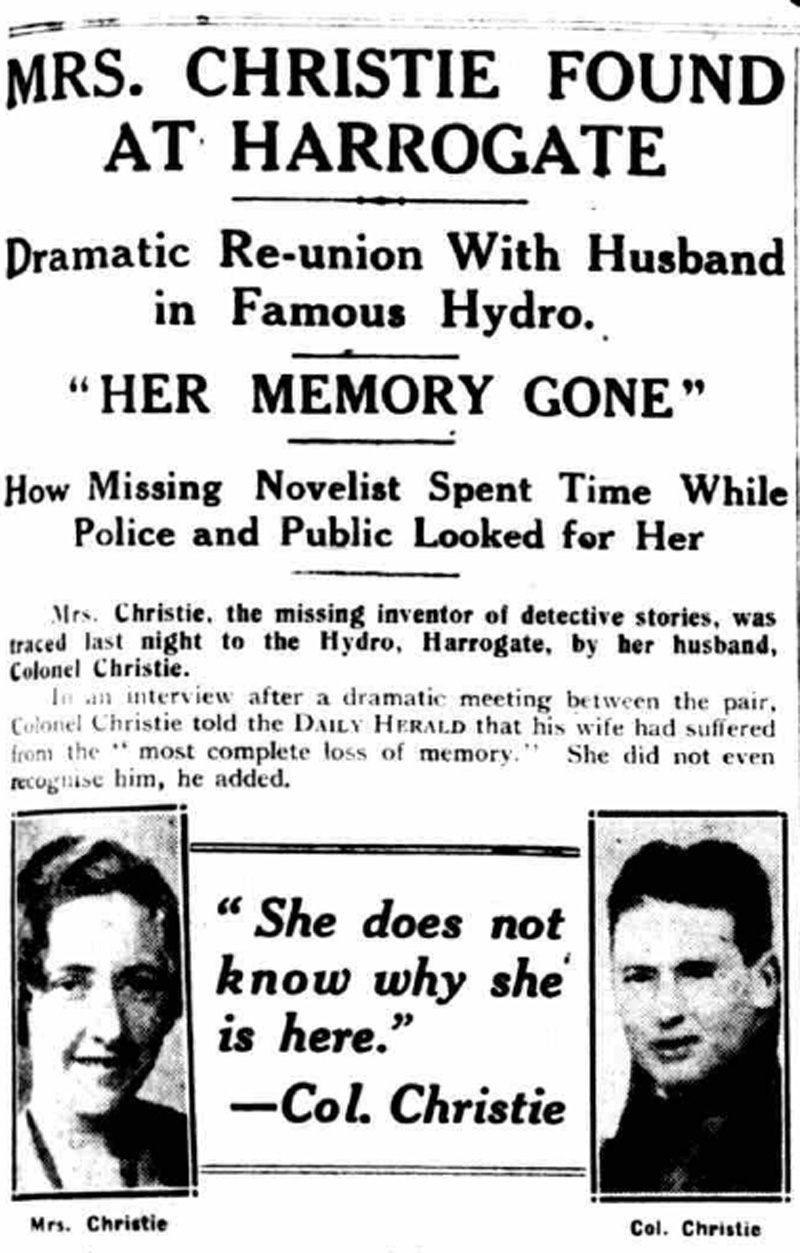
December 3, 1926: Mystery writer Agatha Christie mysteriously disappears for 11 days

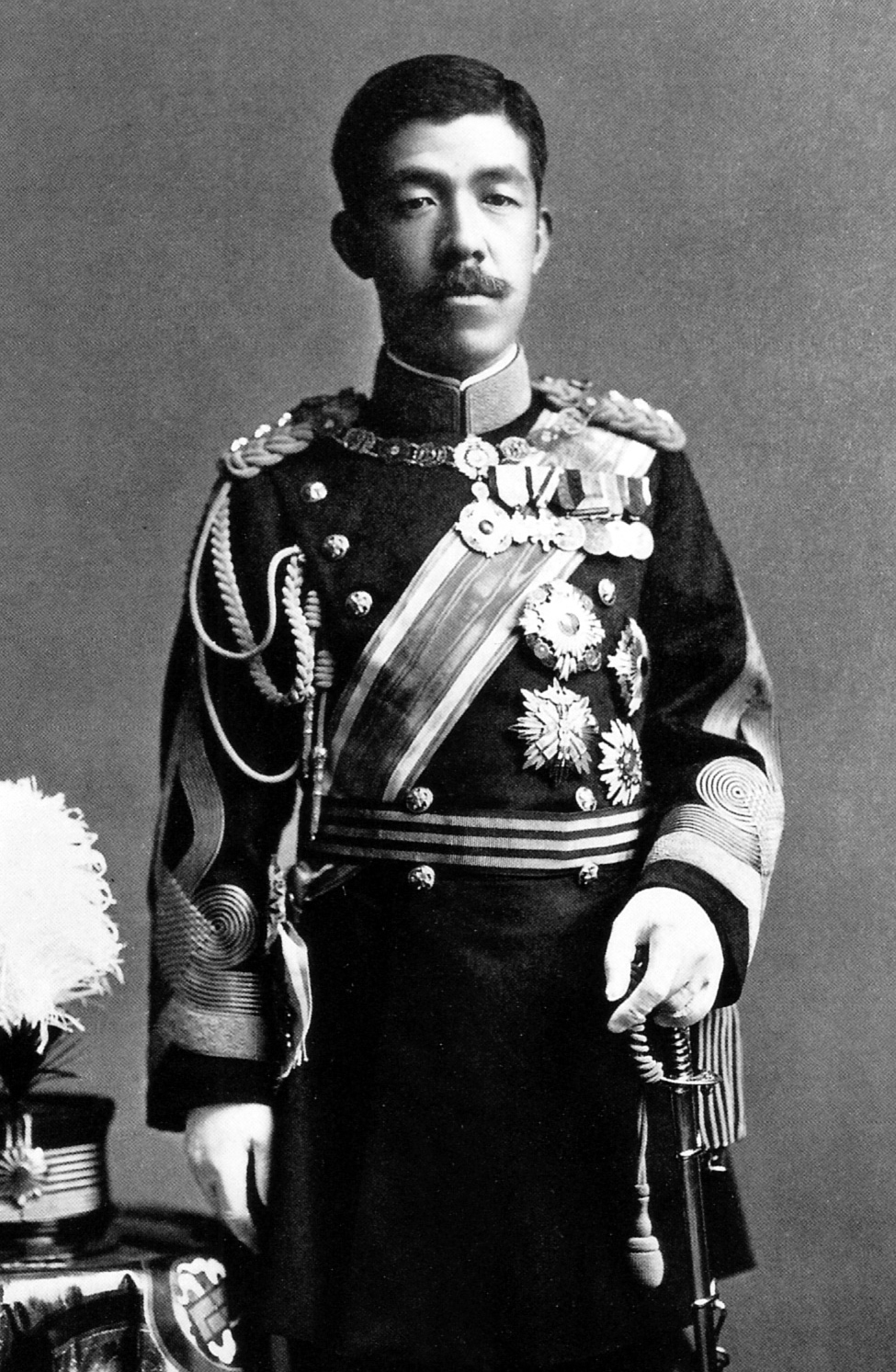
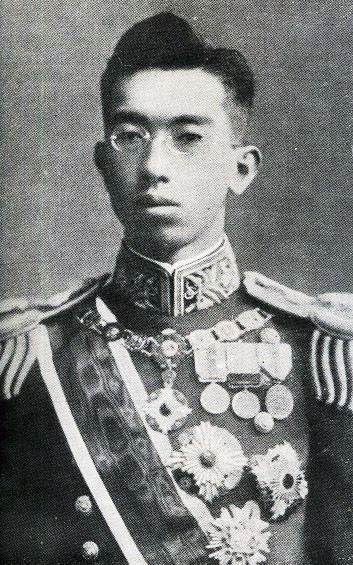
December 25, 1926: Japan's Emperor Yoshihito dies, succeeded by Hirohito as Shōwa Era begins

The following events occurred in December 1926:

== December 1, 1926 (Wednesday) ==
- The "National Pacification Army" was established by the Kuomintang in China, from 60,000 National Revolutionary Army troops who had arrived in Anhui province on November 24, 1926. Zhang Zuolin was named as the NPA's commander-in-chief, with Zhang Zongchang and Sun Chuanfang as his deputies.
- With Nicaragua being occupied by a U.S. Navy force, Juan Bautista Sacasa, leader of the Liberal rebels, declared himself to be the Constitutional President of Nicaragua in a statement from his headquarters at Puerto Cabezas, and former Interior Minister José María Moncada began offensive against the Conservative government. At the time, Adolfo Díaz had been operating as President of Nicaragua at the national capital, Managua. Díaz then requested an additional military intervention from U.S. President Calvin Coolidge, which would begin on January 24, 1927.Musicant, Ivan (1990).
- In elections in the Canadian province of Ontario for the 112 seats of the provincial Legislative Assembly, voters overwhelmingly voted for 80 candidates who had run on a pledge of allowing government-regulated liquor sales, making Ontario the fourth province (after Manitoba, Alberta and Saskatchewan) to opt for a repeal of prohibition. The new 17th Legislative Assembly convened on February 2, 1927, and voted to strike down the Ontario Temperance Act in the province after a decade of enforcement. This left the Maritime provinces (Prince Edward Island, Nova Scotia and New Brunswick) as the only region in Canada to have Prohibition laws.
- In Korea, at the time under the control of the Empire of Japan as the Chōsen protectorate, Japanese Imperial Ordiance No. 17 was implemented, mandating that Korean royal family and nobles (including the King Yi Un, the Crown Prince and the Prince Royal) would be commissioned as military officers in the Imperial Army or Imperial Navy.
- Charlie Chaplin was left by his second wife, Lita Grey, after two years of marriage. They officially divorced in August 1927.
- Finland's national radio station Yle began daily scheduled broadcasting with programs Monday through Saturday from noon to 1:00 pm and 6:00 to 10:00 pm, and an extra hour on Sunday evenings (12-1 and 5:00 pm to 10). Programming was in Finnish on most days, with two evenings of programming in Swedish.
- Born:
  - Mother Antonia Brenner, American-born Mexican Roman Catholic nun known as "The Prison Angel" for her ministry to prisoners, and her voluntary residence at, the maximum security La Mesa Prison in Tijuana; as Mary Clarke in Los Angeles (d.2013)
  - James Greene (stage name for James Thomas Nolan), American character actor and co-star of the TV series The Days and Nights of Molly Dodd; in Lawrence, Massachusetts (d.2018)
  - Allyn Ann McLerie, Canadian actress, singer and dancer; in Grand-Mère, Quebec (d. 2018)
  - Robert Symonds, American stage, TV and film actor; in Bristow, Oklahoma (d. 2007)

== December 2, 1926 (Thursday) ==
- Voting was held in Denmark for all 149 seats of the Folketing, the kingdom's unicameral national legislature. The Socialdemokratiet party of Prime Minister Thorvald Stauning, which had a 55 to 44 lead over the Venstre party of Thomas Madsen-Mygdal retained a plurality but Madsen-Mygdal would be called upon by the King to form a new government.
- Europe's largest department store chain, the Tietz-Gruppe (now KaDeWe) was formed as the Hermann Tietz OHG company purchased the Kaufhaus des Westens and A. Jandorf & Co. stores of Adolf Jandorf. When the Nazi government confiscated the assets of the Jewish Tietz family in 1933, the chain was renamed Hertie, and after World War II, relaunched as KaDeWe, the abbreviation for Kaufhaus Des Westens.
- At a conference in Tianjin, the northern warlords of China formed an alliance to fight the Kuomintang. Zhang Zuolin was elected commander of the army to be known as the Ankuochun.
- British Prime Minister Stanley Baldwin ended the martial law that had been in effect since the general strike.
- Born:
  - Miloš Macourek, Czech book author and screenwriter; in Kromeriz, Czechoslovakia (d.2002)
  - Hobie Billingsley, American diver and coach, known for coaching the U.S. Olympic diving team in 1968, 1972 and 1976, and the Indiana University team 1959–1989, with six NCAA championships; in Erie, Pennsylvania (d.2022)
- Died: Henry Simon, 52, French industrialist and politician who served as France's Minister of the Colonies from 1917 to 1920

== December 3, 1926 (Friday) ==
- British mystery writer Agatha Christie disappeared from her home in Shere, Surrey. Her car was found abandoned several miles away with her clothes and identification strewn about inside, but there were no signs of foul play.

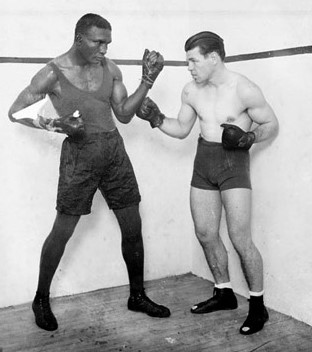
Flowers (left) vs. Walker (right)

- Mickey Walker won boxing's World Middleweight Title, defeating Tiger Flowers on points in a 10-round bout at the Chicago Coliseum.
- One of the most reported upon trials, that of persons accused of committing a double homicide on September 14, 1922, in the Hall–Mills murder case, ended with the acquittal of the wife and the brothers-in-law of the victim Edward Wheeler Hall.
- Born: Robert M. Hayes, American computer scientist and librarian noted for developing systems for the storage and retrieval of information, co-author of Information Storage and Retrieval (1963); in New York City (d.2022)
- Died: Charles Edward Ringling, 63, one of the Ringling brothers circus owners

== December 4, 1926 (Saturday) ==
- The Frankford Yellow Jackets, based in Philadelphia and holding a record of 12-1-1 (12 wins, 1 loss and 1 tie) and at second place in league standings, effectively won the championship of the 22-team National Football League against the unbeaten (11-0-2) first place Chicago Bears before a crowd of 10,000 at Philadelphia's Shibe Park, winning 7 to 6. Trailing 6 to 0 in the fourth quarter, Frankford scored on Hust Stockton's pass to Tex Homan for a touchdown, after which Homan kicked the extra point to put Frankford ahead in the standings (13-1 to 11-1). Neither team lost again in 1926; Frankford would finish at 14-1-2 and Chicago at 12-1-3 for the title.
- The 14th Grey Cup, championship of Canadian football was played before a crowd of 8,276 fans at Varsity Stadium in Toronto, as the Ottawa Senators defeated the Toronto Varsity Blues, 10 to 7.
- The right-wing political party Camp of Great Poland (Obóz Wielkiej Polski) was founded in Poznań by former Foreign Minister Roman Dmowski in opposition to the dictatorship of Jozef Pilsudski.
- San Francisco's luxury lodging, the Mark Hopkins Hotel, was formally opened. It would begin its 100th year in 2026.
- Queen Marie of Romania arrived back in Bucharest after two months away. King Ferdinand was well enough to greet her at the train station.
- Died: Ivana Kobilca, 64, Slovenian painter

== December 5, 1926 (Sunday) ==
- Presidential elections were held in Guatemala as interim president Lázaro Chacón González was overwhelmingly approved by voters to be inaugurated, with almost 89% of the vote in a rigged election against General Jorge Ubico, who would become Guatemala's president from 1931 to 1944.
- Near Farwell, Texas, George Jefferson Hassell murdered his wife by striking her multiple times with a ballpeen hammer, then killed seven of his eight stepchildren (ranging in age from one to 15) by various means, including strangulation, slitting throats with a straight razor, and shooting. Hassel buried all the bodies in a root cellar, then waited four days for his eldest son to return from an out-of-state job, then shot him in the head. After his arrest, he admitted that confessed the nine people, and then confessed to killing his previous wife and her three children, for 13 murders in all. Hassell would be executed in the electric chair at Huntsville on February 10, 1928.
- The Sergei Eisenstein film Battleship Potemkin played in the United States for the first time, in New York City only, at the Biltmore Theatre.
- Born: Alex F. T. W. Rosenberg, German-born U.S. mathematician known for the Hochschild–Kostant–Rosenberg theorem; in Berlin (d.2007)
- Died: Claude Monet, 86, French Impressionist painter

== December 6, 1926 (Monday) ==
- Benito Mussolini decreed a bachelor tax in Italy, effective January 1, on all unmarried men. The tax was progressive by income and sought to encourage marriage and to increase the Italy's birth rate.
- What is now the Republic of Belarus gained additional territory, including the cities of Gomel and Rechytsa, when the Soviet Union ordered the transfer of 48,765 square miles (126,300 km^{2}) of the Russian SFSR to the Byelorussian Soviet Socialist Republic.
- The 43rd Council Session of the League of Nations began in Geneva. The primary matter of discussion was the Military Inter-Allied Commission of Control, which Germany was negotiating to have abandoned.
- In Italy, the province of Frosinone with a capital at the city of the same name was created by royal decree from portions of the provinces of Caserta and of Rome.

== December 7, 1926 (Tuesday) ==
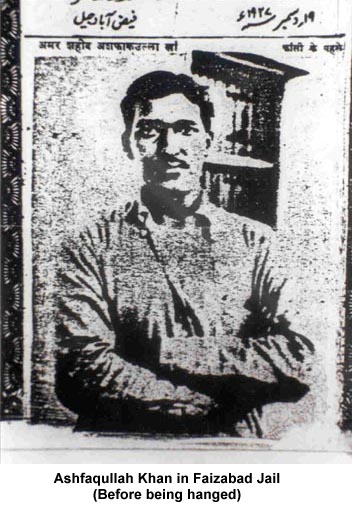
Ashfaqulla Khan after his arrest

- Ashfaqulla Khan, an Indian revolutionary of the Hindustan Republican Association (HRA), was arrested in Delhi after 16-month search by British authorities for the perpetrators of the Kakori train robbery which included the killing of a train passenger on August 9, 1925. The Delhi Police had been alerted to his presence by one of Ashfaqulla Khan's friends. Convicted of armed robbery and manslaughter, Ashfaqulla Khan, the last of the Kakori bandits to be arrested, would be hanged one year later on December 19, 1927.
- U.S. President Calvin Coolidge delivered his fourth State of the Union address to Congress and to the press. As noted by a report at the time, "The message was brought to Congress by a White House messenger and read in each house by the reading clerks, the President departing for the second time from the custom of presenting his messages personally. Senators and Representatives had copies, so they paid little attention to the droning voices of the clerks, although the crowded galleries listened interestedly." Coolidge wrote that "In reporting to the Congress the state of the Union, I find it impossible to characterize it other than one of general peace and prosperity" and spoke on Prohibition of alcohol sales and urged the enforcement of "the law of the land," saying, "Some people do not like the amendment, some do not like other parts of the Constitution, some do not like any of it. Those who entertain such sentiments have a perfect right to seek through legal methods for a change. But for any of our inhabitants to observe such parts of the Constitution as they like, while disregarding others, is a doctrine that would break down all protection of life and property and destroy the American system of ordered liberty."
- Carmi Thompson, leader of a commission to survey the condition of the Philippines, recommended the postponement of independence.
- The Council for the Preservation of Rural England (CPRE, now the Campaign to Protect Rural England) was founded.

== December 8, 1926 (Wednesday) ==
- The government of Mexico's President Plutarco Elías Calles recognized the Nicaraguan rebel Juan Bautista Sacasa as the legitimate President of Nicaragua, rather than Adolfo Díaz, despite the U.S. backing of Diaz.
- Three of the five parts of Bela Bartok's piano composition Szabadban (Out of Doors) were premiered as the first, fourth and fifth pieces were performed on Hungarian radio.

== December 9, 1926 (Thursday) ==
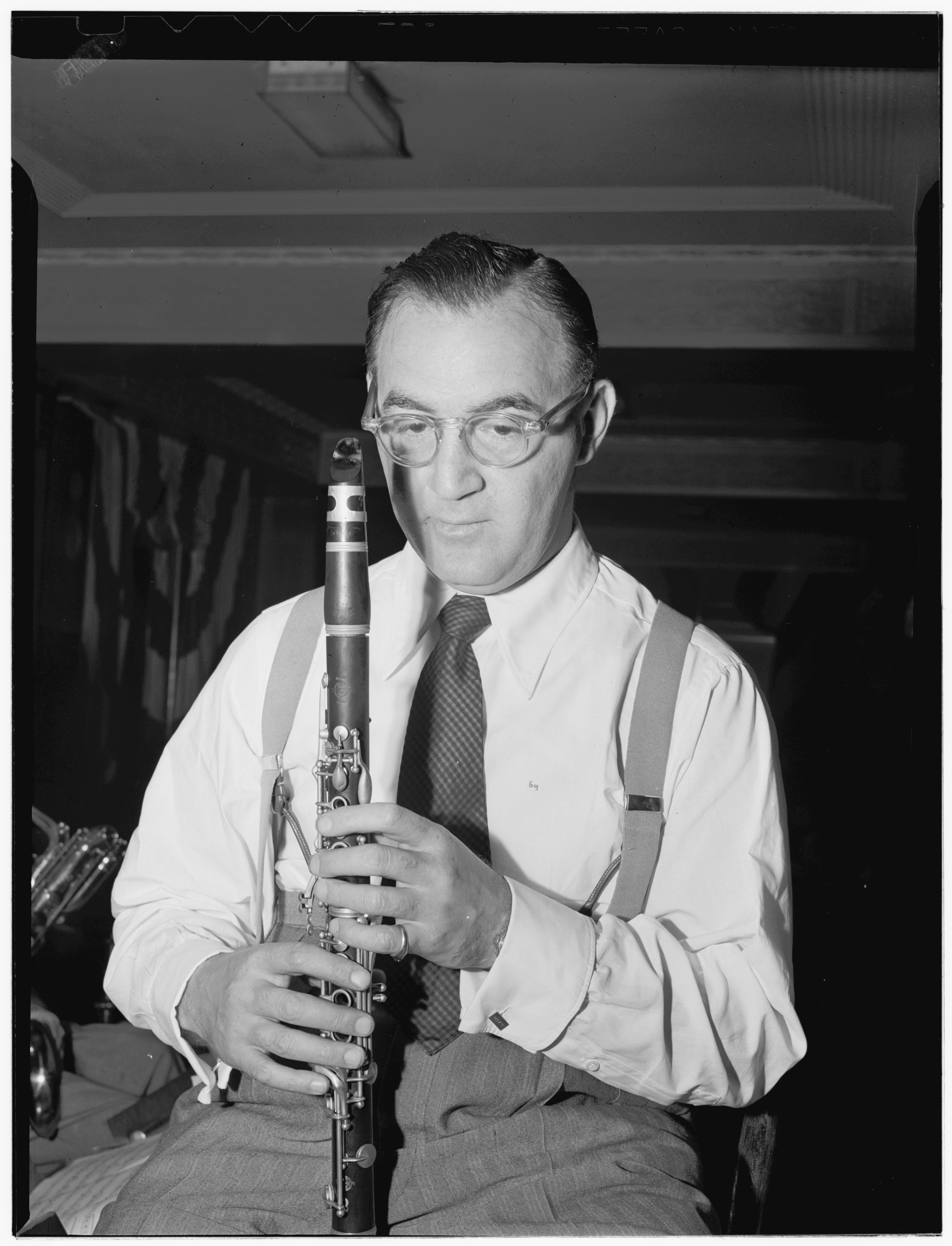
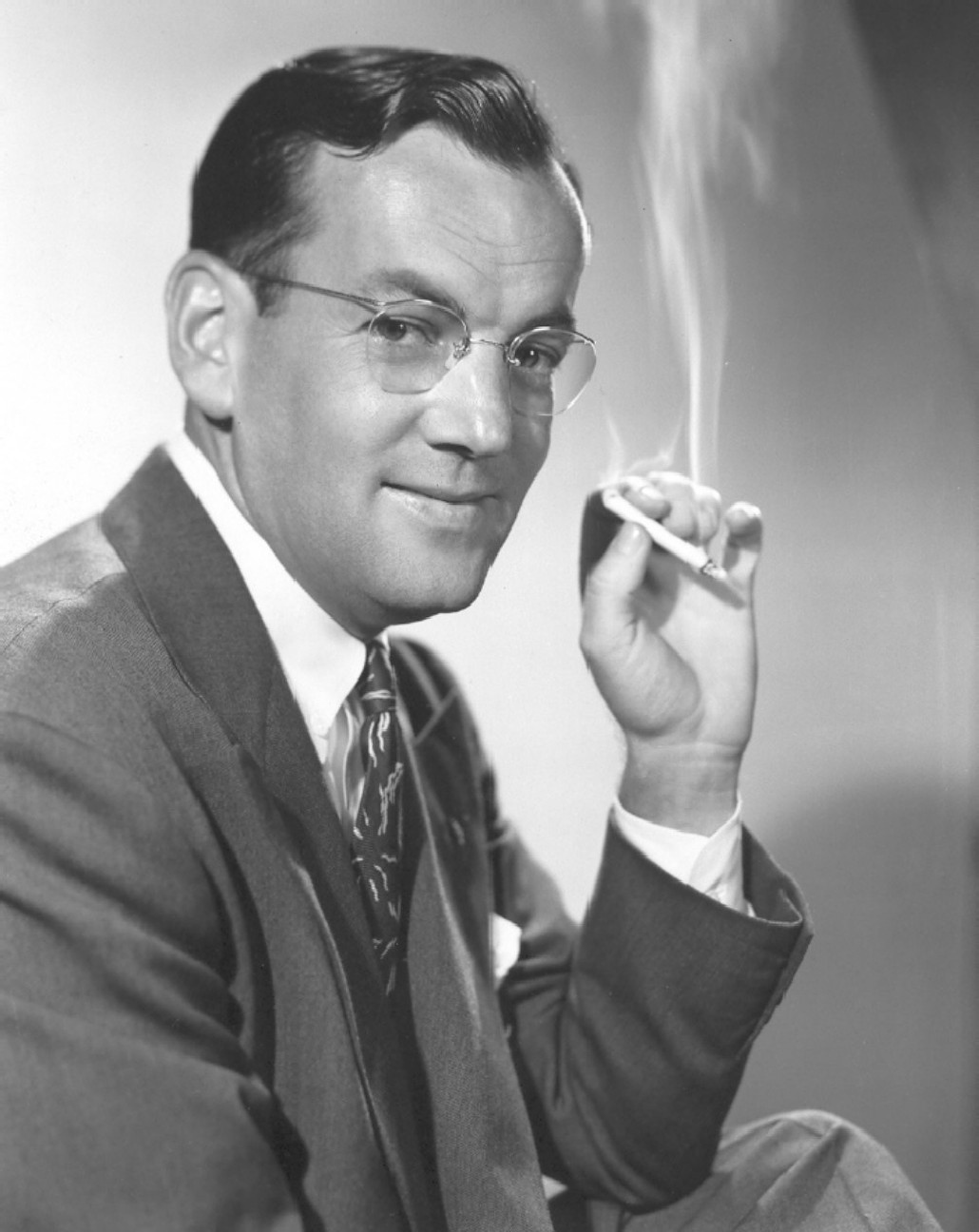
Benny Goodman and Glenn Miller
- Benny Goodman and Glenn Miller made their recording debuts as members of Ben Pollack's orchestra, when it cut the jazz-dance numbers "When I First Met Mary" and "Deed I Do" for the Victor label.
- The Indian School of Mines and Applied Geology (now ISM Dhanabad) was inaugurated by the Lord Halifax, Viceroy of British India in Dhanbad in the Bengal Presidency (now located in the state of Jharkhand.
- A coal mine explosion killed 29 miners at the Francisco Coal Company's No. 2 mine, near Princeton, Indiana.
- In Britain, coal restrictions in force during the labour dispute were lifted.
- Born:
  - Henry Way Kendall, American particle physicist and 1990 Nobel Prize laureate; in Boston (killed in scuba diving accident, 1999)
  - Lorenzo Wright, American athlete and 1948 Olympic gold medalist for the U.S team in the 4 x 100 meter relay; in Detroit (stabbed to death, 1972)

== December 10, 1926 (Friday) ==
- The Nobel Prizes for 1926 were awarded in Oslo. The honourees consisted of Jean Baptiste Perrin (award for Physics), Theodor Svedberg (Chemistry), Johannes Fibiger (Physiology or Medicine) and Grazia Deledda (Literature). The Peace Prize was given to multiple recipients: Aristide Briand of France, Gustav Stresemann of Germany and Austen Chamberlain of the United Kingdom were recognized for their roles in the Locarno Treaties, and Charles G. Dawes of the United States for the Dawes Plan. Chamberlain and Dawes were named retroactively for 1925 as no Peace Prize recipients were named that year.
- Inventors Edmund Germer, Friedrich Meyer and Hans J. Spanner filed the patent application for their creation, the high-pressure vabor fluorescent lamp by way of the General Electric Company.U.S. Patent 2,182,732 would be granted on December 5, 1939.
- Died: Nikola Pašić, 80, Prime Minister of Yugoslavia 1921–1926, and five-time Prime Minister of Serbia 1891–1892, 1904–1905, 1906–1908, 1909–1911 and 1912–1918

== December 11, 1926 (Saturday) ==
- The League of Nations adjourned after adopting a protocol that would terminate the Military Inter-Allied Commission of Control.
- Adolf Hitler published Volume 2 of his autobiographical manifesto Mein Kampf.
- Sir Stanley Fisher, British colonial judge, became the Chief Justice of Ceylon.
- As the Northern Expedition in China continued in the Zhejiang province between the National Revolutionary Army of Chiang Kai-shek and the National Pacification Army of warlord Zhang Zuolin, one of the Sun's commanders, Zhou Fengqi defected to service to Chiang, beginning a wave of defections and to the eventual secession of Zhejiang from Sun's Beiyang United Provinces.
- The Broadway musical Sunny closed after 517 performances.
- Born:
  - Willie Mae "Big Mama" Thornton, American R & B singer and songwriter, industee to the Grammy Hall of Fame, known for being (in 1952) the first artist to record "Hound Dog" and for writing "Ball and Chain"; in Ariton, Alabama (d. 1984)
  - William Alvin Howard, Canadian-born American mathematician known for the Curry–Howard isomorphism; in Vancouver (d.2026)
  - John Haycraft, British India English language teacher who founded the International House World Organisation in 1953; in Quetta, Baluchistan Agency, British India (now in Pakistan (d.1996)
  - V. H. Viglielmo, American university professor, translator and expert on Japanese literature; in Palisades Park, New Jersey (d. 2016)
- Died: G. Frederick H. Schuler, 73, German-born Australian journalist and editor of the daily newspaper Melbourne The Age since 1900.

== December 12, 1926 (Sunday) ==
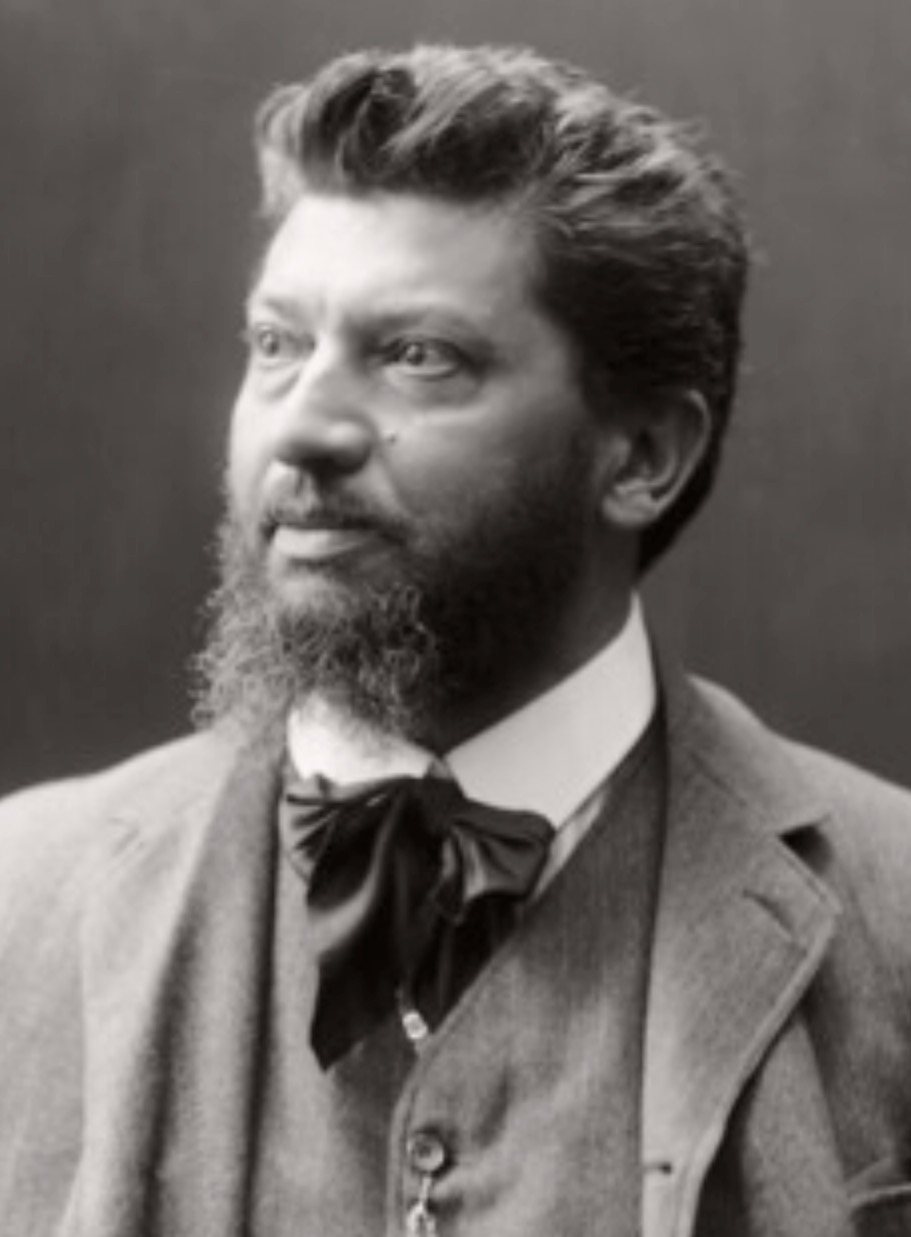
Turati

- The Italian Socialist Filippo Turati completed a dramatic overnight journey by motorboat to Corsica, escaping the Fascists who had restricted his movements under the country's new confinement laws. Turati's escape to France was aided by Carlo Rosselli, Ferruccio Parri and future Italian President Sandro Pertini.
- The sinking of the British cruise ship Lien Shing killed 40 people when the vessel ran aground on the Amherst Rocks at the mouth of China's Yangtze River.
- Irvington, New Jersey, invoked the state's blue law from 1854 to arrest 95 people for doing business on the Sabbath. An organization of ten local ministers was behind the push for enforcement.
- In the first, and only game between at team from the National Football League and the first American Football League, the NFL's New York Giants (who had tied for sixth place in the 22-team NFL) defeated the AFL champion, the Philadelphia Quakers, 31 to 0, "on a field covered with patches of snow, ice and water," before less than 5,000 fans at the Giants' home the Polo Grounds.

== December 13, 1926 (Monday) ==
- The Lockheed Corporation, one of the largest aerospace and aviation manufacturers, now Lockheed Martin after its 1995 merger with Martin Marietta, was incorporated in Nevada by Allan Loughead, John Northrop, Kenneth Kay and Fred Keeler.
- The Chilean Navy transport Arauco foundered off of the coast of Lota, killing 67 of the 96 crew.
- Väinö Tanner formed a government as the Prime Minister of Finland, succeeding Kyösti Kallio. His cabinet included Miina Sillanpää, who would become Finland's first female government minister, serving for Johan Helo as the Deputy Minister of Social Affairs. Tanner's government would last for one year.
- Born: George Rhoden, Jamaican athlete and 1952 Olympic gold medalist in the 400 m dash and the 4x400m relay; in Kingston (d. 2024)
- Died:
  - Karl Friedrich Gegauf, 66, Swiss inventor of the hemstitch sewing machine to make embroidery from more than one color, and founder of the Bernina International company
  - Alajos Stróbl, 70, Hungarian sculptor

== December 14, 1926 (Tuesday) ==
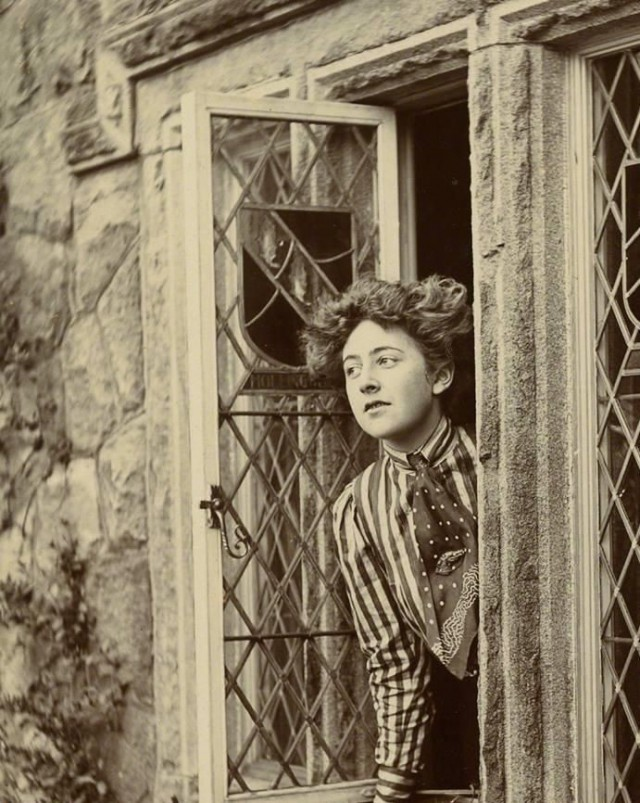
Mrs. Christie

- Agatha Christie, missing for 11 days, was found at a spa in Harrogate. Her husband Archie issued a statement claiming she had been suffering from amnesia.
- A specially prepared phonograph record was played over WGN radio in Chicago, in which Benito Mussolini addressed the American people in the first recording ever made of his voice. The nine-minute address was in Italian and then announcer Bill Hay read an English translation after the recording was finished. Mussolini stated that he felt "the heartiest friendship" for the United States, that he was a "sincere admirer" of American civilization, and that Italian-Americans were "a complete example of the fusion of the two civilizations, a wonderful and profitable treaty of union. So is built an indissoluble relation of cordiality, friendship, and collaboration. The two lands will, I am convinced, travel a long road together."
- The first specimen of the violet banksia tree was collected by Australian botanist Charles Gardner near Lake Grace, Western Australia, and described by him in 1927 as a separate species in the Journal and Proceedings of the Royal Society of Western Australia.
- Crown Prince Olav of Norway assumed temporary rule of the Scandinavian kingdom for the first time, taking control as regent while his father, King Haakon VII, departed for Denmark for a meeting in Copenhagen.
- Born: María Elena Marqués, Mexican film actress and singer, leading lady in Mexican and American films, known in Mexico for Romeo y Julieta (1943) and in the U.S. for The Pearl (1947) and Across the Wide Missouri (1951); in Mexico City (d.2008)
- Died: Théo van Rysselberghe, 64, Belgian neo-impressionist painter.

== December 15, 1926 (Wednesday) ==
- The British Parliament was prorogued until February 8, 1927, with an announcement that, beginning in 1927, the name of the nation would be changed from "United Kingdom of Great Britain and Ireland" to "United Kingdom of Great Britain and Northern Ireland".
- Roman Catholic clergy in the United States issued a collective pastoral letter condemning the ongoing persecution of Catholics in Mexico. Cardinal Hayes of New York sent the letter that denounced Mexico's policy as ""a shocking example of wrong to the whole civilized world."
- The British Government paid $92,950,000 to the United States Treasury toward its semi-annual repayment of the $4,074,818,358.44 American loan of money to the UK during World War One. Sir Maurice Low, the Washington correspondent of London's Morning Post noted that $25 million of the money would go toward principal and the other $67,950,000 toward interest of 4% per annum and added "It will no doubt be as surprising to the British people as it will be to the Americans to learn that, including the payment made today, the British Government has already paid to the American Government $642.830.000 on the debt, no mean achievement in the light of the economic and other difficulties Great Britain has had to meet since the debt-funding agreement was made early in 1923."

== December 16, 1926 (Thursday) ==
- In the Reichstag, Philipp Scheidemann of the Social Democratic Party of Germany (SPD) accused Chancellor Wilhelm Marx of building up a secret army in Germany with arms imported from Russia to restore the Kaiser. Scheidemann's inflammatory speech was followed by the SPD's motion of no confidence the next day.
- Kenesaw Mountain Landis was re-elected to the position of Commissioner of Baseball by major league baseball owners for another seven years, and received an increase in his salary from $50,000 to $65,000 (equivalent to $1.2 million dollars in 2026) a year.
- Born:
  - Richard A. DeWall, American cardiothoracic surgeon who created the first bubble oxygenator to prevent gas embolism during bypass surgery; in Appleton, Minnesota (d.2016)
  - James McCracken, American operatic tenor; in Gary, Indiana (d. 1988)
  - Claude Brinegar, U.S. Secretary of Transportation from 1973 to 1975 during the worldwide energy crisis, known of implementing the reduction of the maximum speed limit in the U.S. to 55 miles per hour; in Rockport, California (d.2009)
- Died: William Larned, 53, American tennis player who won the U.S. Open championship seven times (1901, 1902, and five consecutive years from 1907 to 1911), shot himself in the head at his room in New York City's Knickerbocker Club, after a long illness.

== December 17, 1926 (Friday) ==
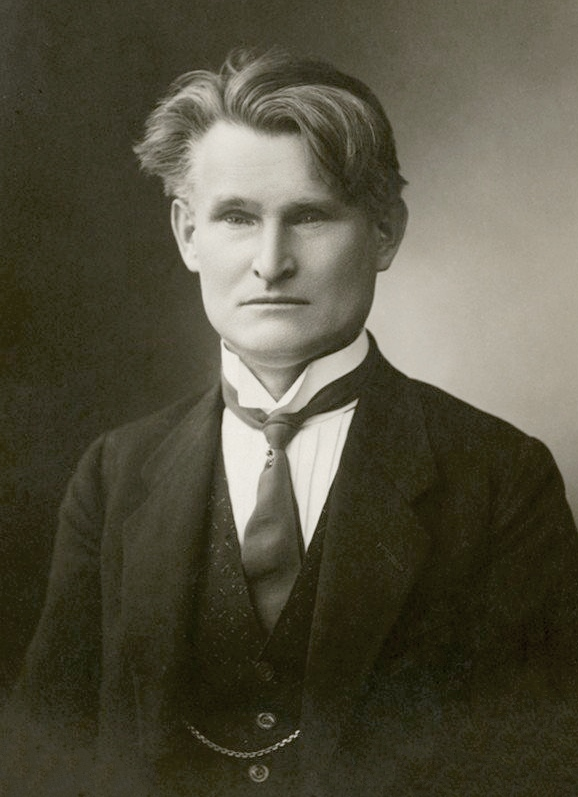
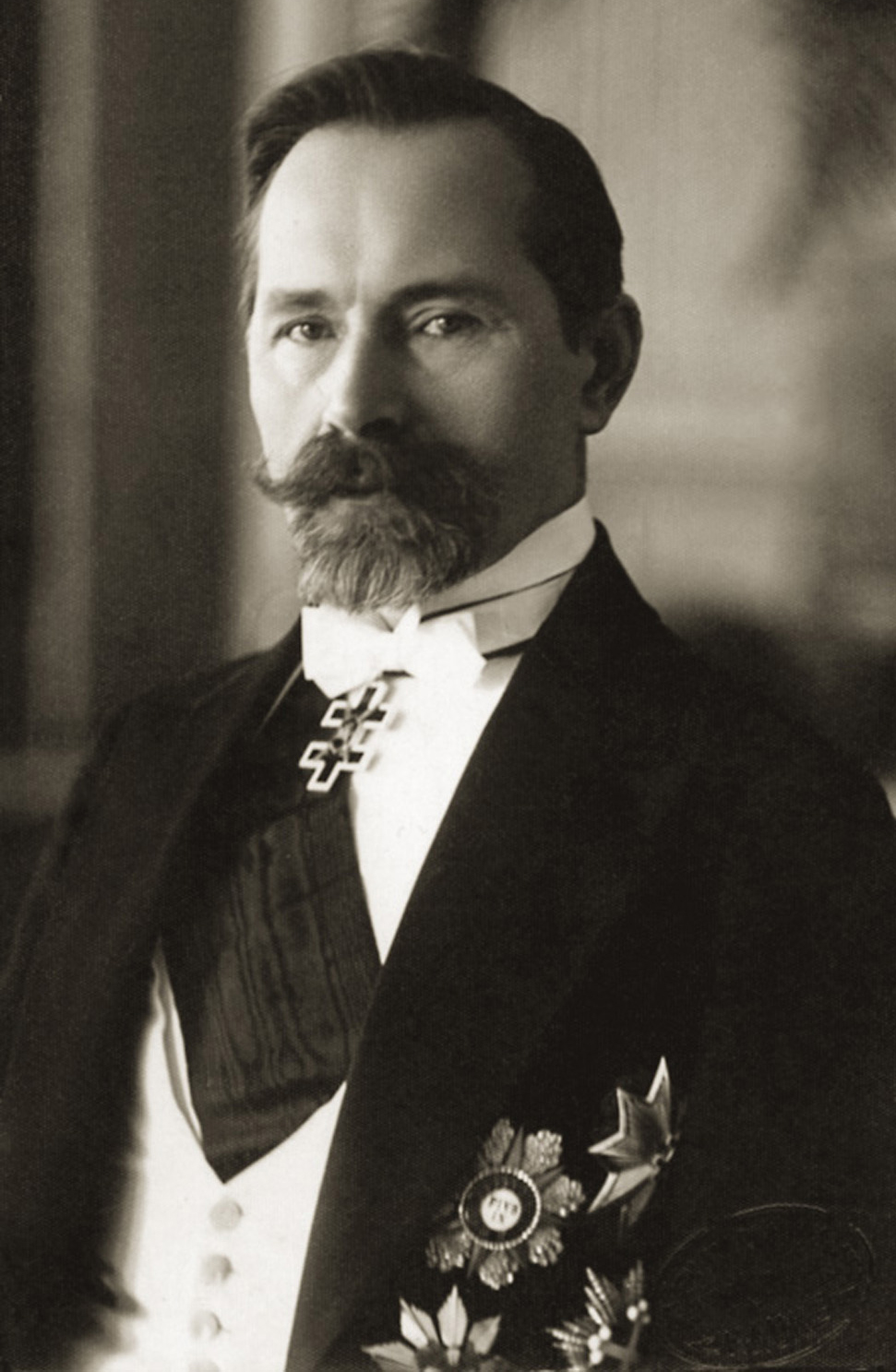
Lithuania's President Grinius arrested at his birthday party, replaced by dicator Antanas Smetona
- Major Povilas Plechavičius, a former officer of the Imperial Russian Army, led a coup d'état to overthrow Lithuania's President Kazys Grinius, and installed former president Antanas Smetona as the new president. Lithuanian Army troops invaded a session of the Seimas parliament at Riga, while President Grinius was arrested at a celebration of his 60th birthday, along with Prime Minister Mykolas Sleževičius and other prominent officials.
- After his government lost a motion of no confidence, 249 to 171, in the Reichstag, Germany's Chancellor Wilhelm Marx and his cabinet of ministers resigned. The Reichstag then adjourned for Christmas vacation. Marx, who was asked by Germany's President Paul von Hindenburg to remain in a caretaker capacity, would form a new coalition government on January 29, 1927.
- The First All-Union Census of the Soviet Union was conducted.
- Born:
  - Allan V. Cox, American geologist, in Santa Ana, California (d. 1987)
  - Bill Keightley, basketball equipment manager, in Lawrenceburg, Kentucky (d. 2008)
- Died: Lars Magnus Ericsson, 80, Swedish inventor and founder of Ericsson

== December 18, 1926 (Saturday) ==
- Brazil's new president, Washington Luís, issued Decree No. 5,108, and directing the introduction of the South American nation's new currency, the cruzeiro, as well as tying the value of the new monetary unit to the gold standard and creating the Stabilization Bank to control the receipt of gold and to print and circulate the new bank notes. President Luis implemented the changes on the advice of his finance minister, future president Getúlio Vargas. However, the 1929 Great Depression and the 1930 overthrow of Luis by Vargas would postpone the reform of Decree 5,108. The real (royal) coin by the cruzeiro took place 16 years after its proposal, on November 1, 1942.
- The Czech language opera The Makropulos Affair written by Leos Janacek, was performed for the first time, premiering at the National Theatre om Brno in Czechoslovakia, and conducted by František Neumann.
- Physical chemist Gilbert N. Lewis of the U.S., known already for his 1916 theory of the covalent bond between electrons, popularized the word photon to describe the subatomic quanta within visible light, although the term had been used 10 years earlier by physicist Leonard T. Troland to describe a unit of illumination, and Albert Einstein had referred to what he called a "Lichtquant" to describe the quantum within light. Lewis's reference came in his article "The conservation of photons" in a letter to the scientific journal Nature.
- In China, the Kuomintang captured Fuzhou, capital of the Fujian province.
- The Sherlock Holmes short story "The Adventure of the Retired Colourman" by Sir Arthur Conan Doyle was published for the first time in Liberty magazine in the United States.
- Born:
  - Yevgeny Tashkov, Soviet Russian film director, screenwriter and actor known for action movies (including Major Whirlwind in 1967) and comedies (including Come Tomorrow, Please... in 1962); in Bykovo, Volgograd Oblast, RSFSR, Soviet Union (d.2012)
  - Duro Ladipo, Nigerian Yoruba language playwright known for Oba ko so (The King Did Not Hang) in 1965; in Osogbo, British Nigeria (d.1978)

== December 19, 1926 (Sunday) ==
- The Condé diamond, stolen in October, was recovered in Paris when a hotel chambermaid bit into an apple left in the room and found it contained the stolen gem. She took it to authorities and several arrests were made.
- Margers Skujenieks formed a new government as the new Prime Minister of Latvia that was accepted by President Janis Cakste, after Prime Minister Arturs Alberings had appointed himself as the Baltic nation's Minister of Finance.
- Fisherman Eli Kelly washed up on the shore of Santa Catalina Island in the U.S. state of California after he and his fishing companion, James McKinley, had been lost at sea for 11 days. An examination of the body of McKinley, who had died from dehydration, and Kelly's own admission, showed that Kelly had survived by eating the flesh of his friend.
- Born:
  - Edmund Purdom, British stage and film actor, known for being the title characters in the musical The Student Prince and in The Egyptian, both in 1954; in Welwyn Garden City, Hertfordshire (d.2009)
  - Alfred Gescheidt, American photographer and pioneer in the use of photomontage; in Queens, New York (d.2012)

== December 20, 1926 (Monday) ==
- Australia's first underground railway (in U.S. English, a "subway") was inaugurated in Sydney with the nation's first electrified train service, necessary for a tunnel where smoke and exhaust would be dangerous. The first person to board the City Railway car "was Mr. C.E. Pickering, bus conductor, of MacKenzie Street, Rocelle," and the first train left the St. James station at 4:54 in the morning.
- At least 51 people men drowned in the Hudson River in New York state when they were trapped inside the motor launch Linseed King as it sank. An estimated 80 men had boarded the boat at New York City's West 95th Street Pier to travel to the Spencer Kellogg & Sons plant in Edgewater, New Jersey. The overloaded vessel then capsized, going down in a few minutes, and there were only 29 survivors.
- Pope Pius XI directed that Roman Catholics disavow themselves from the right-wing political party Action Française and its daily newspaper, L'Action française, based on the writings of the party's chief philosopher, Charles Maurras.
- The St. Louis Cardinals baseball team traded star player Rogers Hornsby to the New York Giants for Frankie Frisch and Jimmy Ring. St. Louis fans were so angered by the trade that Mayor Victor J. Miller tried unsuccessfully to get it overturned, but hindsight would show that the trade went well for the Cardinals.
- Born:
  - Geoffrey Howe, Welsh politician; in Port Talbot, Wales (d. 2015)
  - David Levine, American illustrator; in Brooklyn, New York (d. 2009)

== December 21, 1926 (Tuesday) ==
- Baseball commissioner Kenesaw Mountain Landis released the findings of a three-month investigation into allegations made by Dutch Leonard that Ty Cobb, Tris Speaker and Smoky Joe Wood had conspired to fix a game in 1919. The evidence included letters from Cobb and Wood describing the plot and details on betting, as well as testimony in which they admitted to writing the letters but denied betting on the game.
- Vivian Stranders, a retired British officer for the Royal Air Force and its intelligence division, was arrested in France on charges of leaking military secrets to Germany's Nazi Party.
- Oswald Mosley of the Labour Party, won the Smethwick by-election. He would serve until 1931 and then be the founder of the Nazi-sympathizing British Union of Fascists.
- Born:
  - Joe Paterno, American college football coach for the Penn State Nittany Lions, known for guiding the team to two NCAA championships (1982 and 1986) from 1966 to 2011 when he was forced to resign for a scandal; in Brooklyn, New York (d. 2012)
  - Champ Butler, American singer; in St. Louis, Missouri (d. 1992);
  - Gabor Acs, Hungarian-born U.S. architect known for designing the Watergate complex in Washington, D.C.; in Budapest (alive in 2026)
- Died: Harold Raeburn, 61, Scottish mountaineer known for making the first ascents of numerous mountains in Norway and Scotland

== December 22, 1926 (Wednesday) ==
- The government of Romania introduced a bill that would make it a crime for anyone to send out news offending the King, Queen or Crown Prince. The punishment would be four years in prison and a $100 fine.
- The life insurance company that had insured illusionist Harry Houdini concluded that his October 31 death was not related to an earlier punch to his abdomen by a McGill University student. As such, the company denied the double indemnity clause of the policy and determined that Houdini's beneficiaries were entitled to $25,000 rather than $50,000.
- Born:
  - Alcides Ghiggia, Uruguayan footballer with 12 games for the Uruguay national team and five for the Italy team, known for scoring the winning goal that won the 1950 FIFA World Cup for Uruguay against Brazil; in Montevideo (d. 2015).
  - Hajrudin Krvavac, Bosnian Yugoslavian film director known for his trilogy of partisan films in post-World War II Yugoslavia, concluding with his best known work, Valter brani Sarajevo (Valter Defends Sarajevo) in 1972; in Sarajevo (d. 1992)

== December 23, 1926 (Thursday) ==
- Nicaraguan President Adolfo Díaz requested U.S. military assistance in the ongoing civil war. American peacekeeping troops immediately set up neutral zones in Puerto Cabezas and at the mouth of the Rio Grande to protect American and foreign lives and property. An attempt was made that evening to assassinate President Díaz as two men charged at him with machetes as he was entering his cab. After the attempt, hundreds of Managua residents were arrested by Nicaragua's national guardsmen.
- Two Southern Railway passenger trains, the northbound Ponce de Leon and the southbound Royal Palm, collided at Rockmart, Georgia, killing 19 people and injuring 113, with all the fatalities happening on the Ponce de Leon.
- The Japanese fishing trawler Ryo Yei Maru, with a crew of 12, was disabled by the failure of its engine while in the Pacific Ocean, and then blown off course. It drifted at sea over the next ten months, for more than 4,000 miles (6,400 km), as its crew slowly starved to death, with the last survivor leaving behind notes that ended with an entry for July 1927. Ryo Yei Maru would finally be located on October 31, 1927, off of the coast of Cape Flattery of the U.S. state of Washington, when it was found by the American steamship Margaret Dollar.
- The film Tell It to the Marines, starring Lon Chaney, premiered in New York. The movie would be the second highest grossing film of 1927.
- Born:
  - Jac Venza, American PBS public television producer known for the programs including NET Playhouse, Live from Lincoln Center, American Playhouse, American Masters, and Great Performances; in Chicago (d.2024)
  - Robert Bly, American poet, author and activist; in Lac qui Parle County, Minnesota (d. 2021)
- Died:
  - Shraddhanand (Munshi Ram), Indian independence activist and co-founder of Gurukul Kangri University in Uttarakhand state, and proponent of the Shuddhi reform movement within Hinduism, was assassinated by a Muslim radical, Abdul Rashid, who was outraged aboud Shraddhanand' criticism of Islam.
  - Dr. Thomas Strangeways, 60, British pathologist who founded the Cambridge Research Hospital, now called the Strangeways Research Laboratory
  - Mortimer Wagar, 69, American businessman who organized the controversial Clearing House of the Consolidated Stock Exchange of New York, a rival to the New York Stock Exchange, died a few months after Consolidated was closed by an injunction.

== December 24, 1926 (Friday) ==
- What has been described as the first pre-recorded jingle for a commercial was played in the U.S. on a Minneapolis radio station, WCCO, with lyrics sung to the tune of the then-popular song "She's a Jazz Baby". The first lines of the song were "Have you tried Wheaties? They're whole wheat with all of the bran. Won't you try Wheaties? For wheat is the best food of man."
- Died:
  - Johan Castberg, 64, Norwegian Radical politician
  - Beatrix Lucia Catherine Tollemache, British writer, translator and poet
  - A. F. Bettinson, 64, English boxing promoter and co-founder (with John Fleming) of the National Sporting Club to regulate professional boxing

== December 25, 1926 (Saturday) ==
- Japan's Emperor Taishō, also referred to by his birth name of Yoshihito, died at the age of 47 from a heart attack while attempting to recover from pneumonia. He was convalescing at his home at the Hayama Imperial Villa on Sagami Bay The Emperor Taisho's son Prince Hirohito, became the new Emperor.
- On the day of the death of the Emperor Yoshihito, Japanese engineer Kenjiro Takayanagi made the first public demonstration of television, with a presentation at Hamamatsu Industrial High School in the Shizuoka Prefecture.
- The film Flesh and the Devil, starring Greta Garbo and John Gilbert, was released.
- Born: Eugene Gendlin, Austrian-born American psychologist and philosopher, known for developing the psychotherapy technique of "focusing"; in Vienna (d.2017)

== December 26, 1926 (Sunday) ==
- More than 2,000 residents of Nashville, Tennessee, were driven from their homes due to flooding from the Cumberland River.
- In the history of Japan, the Shōwa era began, succeeding the Taishō era (1912-1926) following the death of the Emperor Yoshihito the day before. Under the reign of Emperor Hirohito, the Showa era would last until early 1989, and be followed by the Heisei era (1989-2019) of the Emperor Akihito.
- Finnish composer Jean Sibelius's tone poem Tapiola was premiered by Walter Damrosch and the New York Philharmonic, the last substantial composition to be made public by the composer for the remaining 30 years of his life.
- Born:
  - Gina Pellón, Cuban painter; in Cumanayagua(d. 2014)
  - Earle Brown, American musical composer known for the "open form" style of musical construction; in Lunenburg, Massachusetts (d.2002)
- Died: Fred Hovey Allen, 81, American inventor, writer and clergyman known for creating the first photogravure plates for reproduction of paintings.

== December 27, 1926 (Monday) ==
- The French freighter Eugene Schneider sank after colliding with the British ship SS Burutu in the English Channel south of the Isle of Wight, with 24 of her 28 crew drowning. Four survivors were rescued by he Burutu.

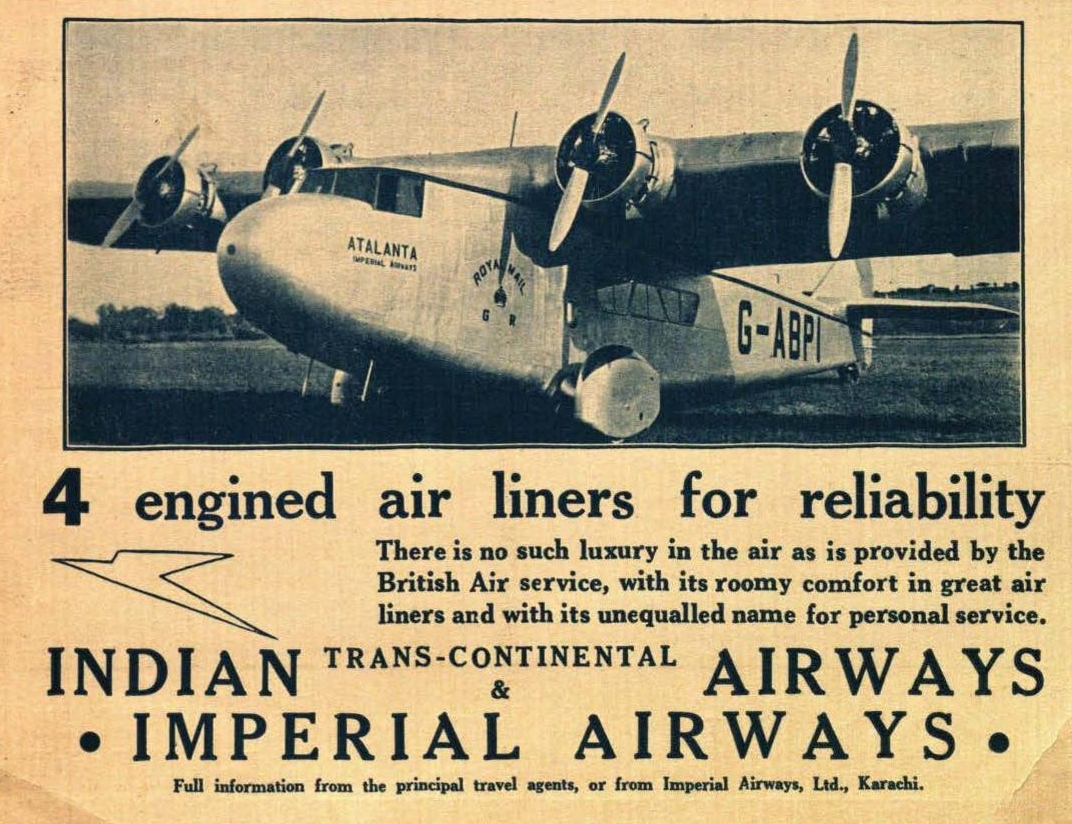

- Imperial Airways announced the first scheduled air service from Britain to India starting January 1.
- The Richard Rodgers and Lorenz Hart musical Peggy-Ann opened on Broadway at the Vanderbilt Theatre for the first of 333 performances, closing on October 29, 1927. Earlier in the day, the Rodgers and Hart musical The Girl Friend had closed at the Vanderbilt after 301 performances that had started on March 17.
- German chemists Walter Heerdt and Bruno Tesch were awarded the patent for the hydrogen cyanide-based poison gas Zyklon B after having applied on June 20, 1922. The chemical would be used to murder millions of people in Nazi Germany's extermination camps in World War Two.
- Born:
  - Jerome Courtland (stage name for Courtland Jourolmon Jr.), American stage, film and TV actor known for the TV show Tales of the Vikings, later a Disney film producer known for Escape to Witch Mountain (1975) and The Devil and Max Devlin (1981); in Knoxville, Tennessee (d.2012)
  - Romena Afaz, Bangladeshi novelist known for her adventure thriller series of Doshyo Bonhur books; in Sherpur, Bogra, Bengal Presidency, British India (now in Bangladesh) (d.2003)
- Died:
  - Gustav Klemperer von Klemenau, 74, German banker who had chaired the Dresdner Bank since 1925.
  - Karolis Pozela, 30; Kazys Giedrys, 35; Juozas Greifenbergeris, 28; and Rapolas Carnas, 26, Lithuanian Communists who were arrested after the December 17 coup d'etat and overthrow of President Kazys Grinius by Antanas Smetona, were all executed by firing squad at the Kaunas Fortress after being convicted by a military tribunal of attempting to organize a counter-coup.

== December 28, 1926 (Tuesday) ==
- Korean nationalist Na Seok-ju attacked the Oriental Development Company Building, a symbol of Imperial Japan's colonialism, in Seoul. He killed several Japanese office workers and a police officer with grenades and bullets before fatally shooting himself as police were closing in. He was later hailed for his actions as a national hero.
- The village of Niamey, with a population of only 3, 142 people was made the capital of France's Colony of Niger by Governor Jules Brévié after more than a year of construction of government buildings, primarily by using forced labor. Within 100 years, the population of Niamey had grown to more than 1.4 million.
- Emperor Hirohito and Empress Kōjun held their first levée. Hirohito read a script outlining his policies of what was to be sought, among them "national harmony in purpose and action" and "beneficience to all classes of people and friendship for all nations on earth."
- In Melbourne, Australia, Victoria scored a First-class cricket record 1,107 runs against New South Wales.
- Died:
  - Robert William Felkin, 73, British physician, Baptist missionary, writer and Rosicrucian
  - Elisabeth Wandel, 76, Danish portrait and landscape painter

== December 29, 1926 (Wednesday) ==
- District Attorney Asa Keyes announced that the Aimee Semple McPherson trial would not go forward and that the charges against her of faking her kidnapping story would be dropped. "Dismissal of charges is necessary because of the impossibility of conviction in the present state of the case", Keyes stated.
- Died:
  - Rainer Maria Rilke, 51, Austrian poet and novelist, known for The Book of Hours (1905) and the novel The Notebooks of Malte Laurids Brigge, died from leukemia.
  - Matilda Smith, 72, British Indian-born English botanical artist

== December 30, 1926 (Thursday) ==
- The play Chicago, a satire written by Maurine Dallas Watkins, premiered on Broadway at the Music Box Theatre for the first of 172 performances. It would be adapted to a silent film in 1927, than as the 1942 film Roxie Hart and, as a hit musical written by John Kander and Fred Ebb that would run from 1975 to 1977 for 936 performances.
- Government troops of Nicaraguan President Adolfo Díaz were routed at Pearl Lagoon by the rebel forces of Juan Bautista Sacasa.
- Born: Gordon Winrod, former American Christian minister, anti-Semite and convicted kidnapper; in Wichita, Kansas (d. 2019)
- Died:
  - Admiral Felice Napoleone Canevaro, 88, Peruvian-born Italian Navy officer who served as Minister of Foreign Affairs in 1898 and 1899 and was a veteran of the first and second Italian Wars of Independence
  - Dr. Genoveva Guardiola de Estrada Palma, 68, widow of the Tomas Estrada Palma, the first President of Cuba and thus the first First Lady of Cuba from 1902 to 1906.

== December 31, 1926 (Friday) ==
- Turkey, the last nation in the world to use the old Julian calendar (which was 13 days behind the Gregorian by the 20th century), marked the day as "December 18, 1926", then switched over at midnight to the Gregorian calendar as part of the reforms set by Mustafa Kemal Atatürk. At 12:01 am, the official date in Turkey was "January 1, 1927".
- The British Broadcasting Company, Ltd. forerunner of the BBC, dissolved and sold its assets to the British Broadcasting Corporation, which commenced operations the next day.
- As a New Year's gift, King Alfonso XIII of Spain either granted pardons or commuted the sentences of all the artillery officers involved in the protests of the previous September.
- The Académie française voted, 8 to 5, on a resolution in favor of declaring that animals have souls.
- The Buster Keaton silent comedy film The General, distributed by United Artists, had its world premiere in Tokyo. It would have its premiere in the U.S. on February 5, 1927, and later be included in the initial films in the National Film Registry maintained by the U.S. Library of Congress.Meade, Marion (1997). Buster Keaton: Cut to the Chase. New York, New York: Da Capo Press. p. 171. ISBN 0306808021.
- Loetoeng Kasaroeng, the first film to be produced in the Dutch East Indies (now Indonesia) and the first to feature a native Indonesian cast, was premiered at two theaters in Bandung.Biran, Misbach Yusa (2009). Sejarah Film 1900–1950: Bikin Film di Jawa [History of Film 1900–1950: Making Films in Java] (in Indonesian). Jakarta: Komunitas Bamboo. pp. 66–68. ISBN 978-979-3731-58-2.
- Born:
  - Billy Snedden, Australian politician who was Speaker of the Australian House of Representatives from 1976 to 1983, Leader of the Opposition as chairman of the Australian Liberal Party from 1964 to 1972; in West Perth, Western Australia (d. 1987)
  - Kongara Jaggayya, Indian film star in Telugu cinema; in Tenali, Madras State, British India (now Andhra Pradesh state (d.2004)
  - Richard Seaver, American book editor and publisher for Grove Press, Viking Press, and Holt, Rinehart and Winston; in Watertown, Connecticut (d.2009)
