= Ramlal Siyag =

Indian contemporary saint

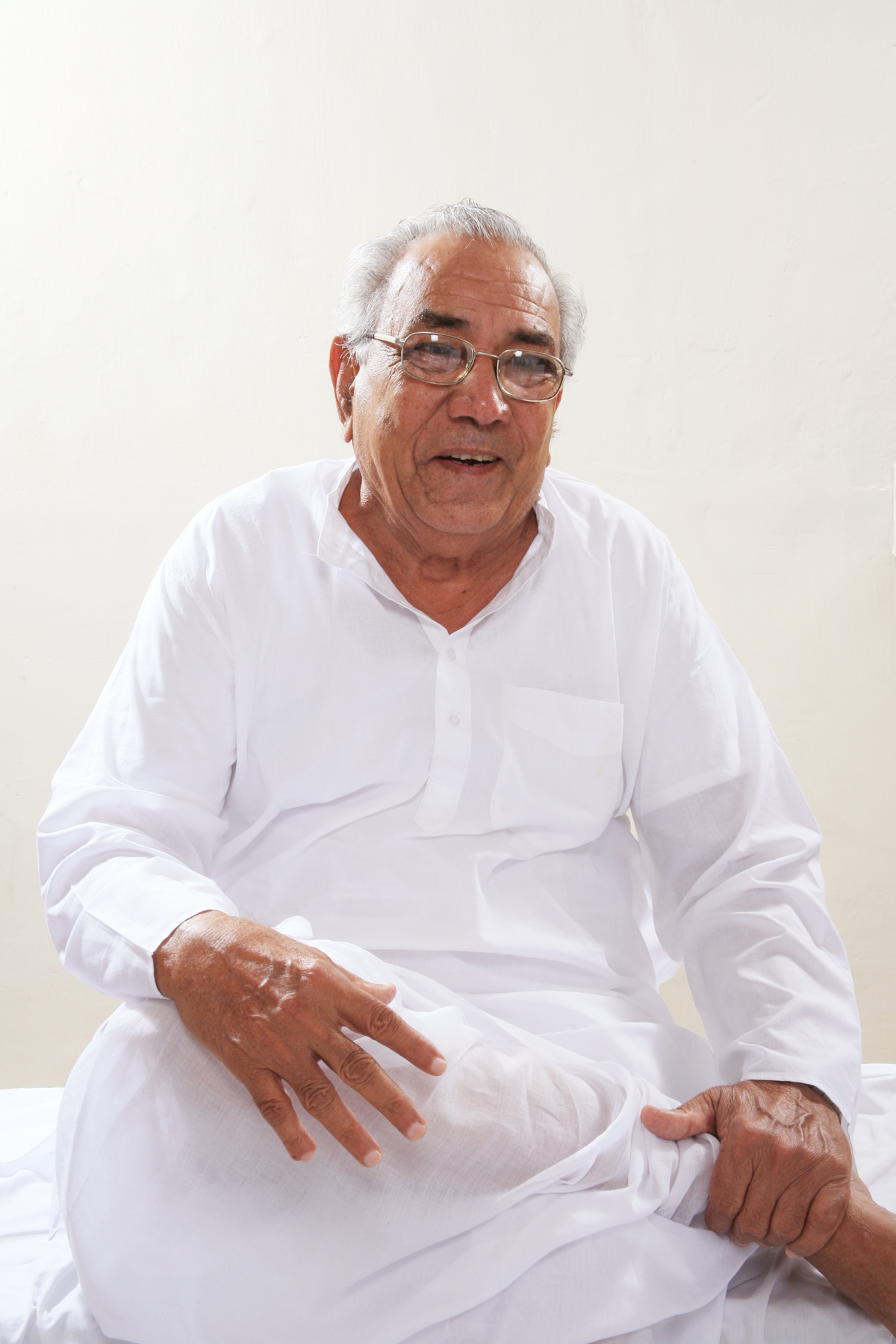
- Ramlal Siyag

Personal life
- Born: 24 November 1926 Palana, Bikaner, Rajasthan, India
- Died: 5 June 2017 (aged 90) Jodhpur, Rajasthan, India
- Website: the-comforter.org

Religious life
- Religion: Hinduism
- Founder of: Adhyatma Vigyan Satsang Kendra, Jodhpur

Religious career
- Teacher: Gangainath

Ramlal Siyag (24 November 1926 – 5 June 2017), was an Indian contemporary saint who is known for spreading Siddha Yoga, a chanting and meditation based spiritual practice, based on the yoga as codified by sage Patanjali in a treatise called 'Yoga Sutra'.

== Early life and education ==
Ramlal Siyag was born on 24 November 1926 in Palana village of Bikaner district, Rajasthan, India. He was about three years old when he lost his father. His mother brought him up. After completing his high school studies, he took up the job of a clerk with the Indian Railways. He had five children- four sons and a daughter from his marriage.

== Beginning of Spiritual Life ==
In 1968, Ramlal Siyag developed an unknown fear of death. On the recommendation of a friend, he chanted the Gayatri mantra 125,000 times along with the fire sacrifice (havan), starting from the Navratri that comes in the month of October in the year 1968. After completing the chants, in deep meditation he realized that his body had transformed into divine light. He attained the Gayatri Siddhi by this. He accepted saint Gangainath as his spiritual master and later attained the Krishna Siddhi in 1984. Ramlal has explained these spiritual experiences in detail in the book, Religious Revolution in the World. His disciples experience spontaneous yogic movements on practicing this yoga and transformation of tendencies. A great Indian philosopher and Yogi, Sri Aurobindo, has explained about the trans-formative effect of yoga on mankind in his books, The life Divine and The Synthesis of Yoga.

== Spreading Siddha Yoga ==
At the behest of his Guru, he took premature retirement from Railways, and started initiating disciples into Siddha Yoga by Shaktipat Diksha. It involves chanting and meditation and is based on the philosophy of Patanjali Yoga Sutra. He visited Israel and the US a few times to spread the Siddha Yoga philosophy. He is also the spiritual master of celebrities like Elizabeth Kucinich, Brad Pitt and Angelina Jolie and has given spiritual initiation to them during his visit to the US in 2005.

He is the founder of Adhyatma Vigyan Satsang Kendra, located in Jodhpur. The book, ‘Religious Revolution in the World’, first published in July 1997, was authored by him.

Ramlal Siyag died on 5 June 2017, at an age of 92.
