= Ryo Yei Maru =

The Ryo Yei Maru was a small Japanese fishing smack that went derelict in a gale in December 1926 when its engine failed and then drifted until October 1927, during which time its crew died of thirst and starvation.

== History ==
On 31 October 1927, the steamship freighter Margaret Dollar (built in 1921 as the S.S. Celestial and renamed in 1922) was transiting off the Washington coast when, off Cape Flattery, it came upon a drifting Japanese fore-and-aft rigged fishing boat, the Ryo Yei Maru, a sturdy vessel of fairly recent construction. The name translates as "Good and Prosperous", according to a period Associated Press news account. A United Press account gives the vessel's name as the Ryoei Maru. There was no one alive on board.

Rescuers found the remains of the twelve crew on board, although only the last two survivors’ bodies were intact. The final crewman alive had succumbed on 11 May from starvation. The bones of many other crew gave mute testimony to cannibalism of the deceased crew's bodies by the last survivors.

The Margaret Dollar towed the vessel to the United States quarantine station at Port Townsend, Washington, where customs officials took charge of the boat. Physicians who went aboard said that there was "no question" that cannibalism had been practiced by the last survivors. The bones of seven or eight crew were aboard the derelict.

Officials also stated that presence of a woman's purse containing ten Japanese coppers as well as bits of clothing "unmistakably belonging to a woman", suggested that a female not part of the crew had been aboard.

The boat had suffered engine failure on 23 December 1926 in a gale, and had drifted 4,000 or 5,000 miles from the coast of Japan over ten months.

“Barely decipherable Japanese characters scrawled upon a board in the death ship’s cabin gave a meager record of the last days of the starving crew. The writing was said to indicate that the ship drifted helplessly for seven months after the captain and crew of it despaired of repairing their stalled gasoline engine. Three months ago the starving Japanese gave up hope of living when they saw the first of their number taken by death, the scrawled and faded script in the cabin revealed.”

After a Buddhist funeral ceremony for the 12 men, their bodies were cremated and the vessel was burned.
