= Palana, Bikaner =

Village in Bikaner, Rajasthan

Palana
- Location within Rajasthan Location within India
- Coordinates: 27.843°N 73.262°E
- Elevation: 263 m (863 ft)

Population (2011 Census)
  - Total: 9,331

Languages
  - Official: Hindi, English
  - Palana madnotan: Marwari, Rajasthani
- Time zone: UTC+5:30 (IST)
- PIN: 334402
- Telephone code: 0151
- Vehicle registration: RJ-07

Palana is a village in Bikaner District, Rajasthan, India. It is located 52 km from Malasar.

== Demographics ==
As of the 2011 Indian census, Palana had a population of 9,331. Males constitute 53% of the population and females 47%. Palana has an average literacy rate of 51%: male literacy is 66%, and female literacy is 34%.
