= Pulvermacher's chain =

Battery for quack medical applications

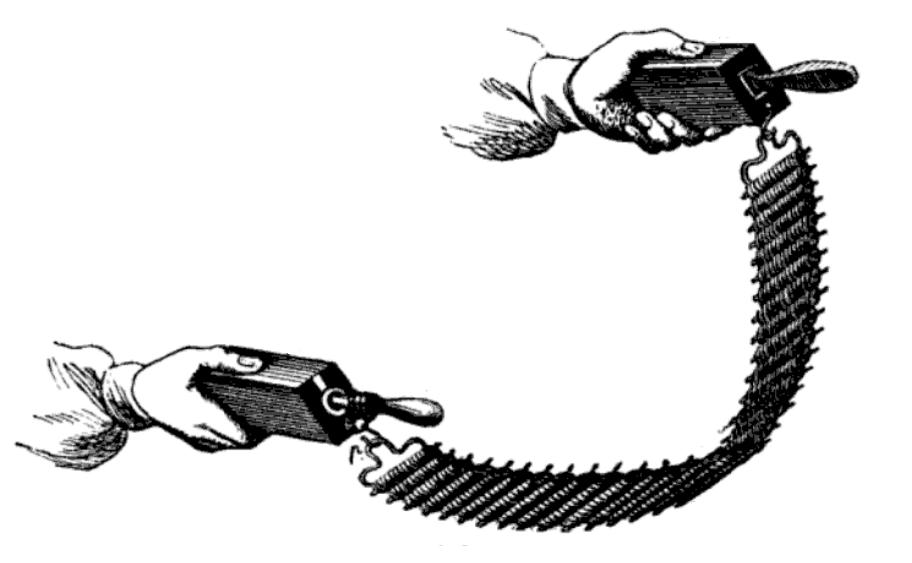
Fig. 1. Pulvermacher's chain. The handles pointing away from the holder are insulated so that the physician can safely place the device in contact with any part of the patient's body.

The Pulvermacher chain, or in full as it was sold the Pulvermacher hydro-electric chain, was a type of voltaic battery sold in the second half of the 19th century for medical applications. Its chief market was amongst the numerous quack practitioners who were taking advantage of the popularity of the relatively new treatment of electrotherapy, or "electrification" as it was then known. Its unique selling point was its construction of numerous linked cells, rendering it mechanically flexible. A variant intended to be worn wrapped on parts of the body for long periods was known as Pulvermacher's galvanic chain or electric belt.

The Pulvermacher Company attracted a great deal of antagonism from the medical community due to their use of the names of well-known physicians in their advertising without permission. The nature of their business; in selling to charlatans and promoting quack practices also made them unpopular with the medical community. Despite this, the Pulvermacher chain was widely reported as a useful source of electricity for medical and scientific purposes, even amongst the most vocal critics of the Pulvermacher Company.

== Construction ==
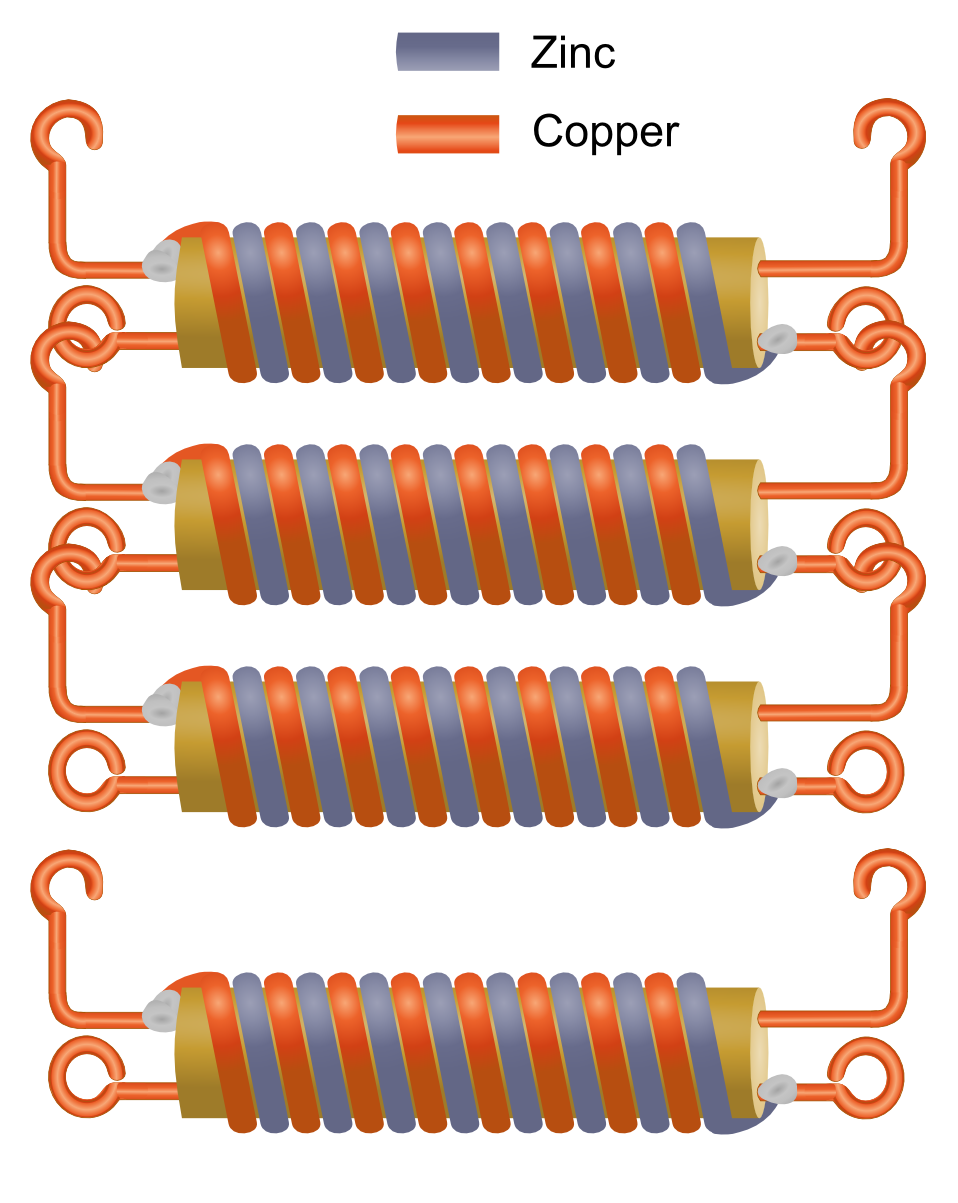
Fig. 2. Cells of the chain showing details of the method of linking them together.

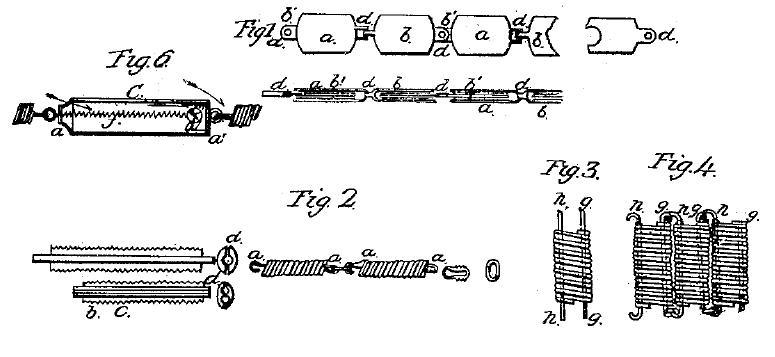
Fig. 3. Details of chain links from Pulvermacher's patent. Pulvermacher's figure 1 is a chain battery made of more conventional cells with flat plates. Figure 2 is Pulvermacher's chain joined end-to-end with the grooved dowels shown to the left. Figures 3 and 4 show respectively a link and a chain with the cells joined side-by-side. Figure 6 is Pulvermacher's interrupter link.

Electrically, the machine worked like a voltaic pile, but was constructed completely differently. The electrodes were copper for the cathode and zinc for the anode, with the electrolyte consisting of vinegar or some other weak acid, or a salt solution.

Each cell consisted of a wooden dowel with a bifilar winding of copper and zinc wires. The dowels were helically grooved like a screw thread to locate the wires precisely in position. This enabled the copper and zinc wires to be placed very close to each other without coming into electrical contact. Insulated wires could not be used as this would interfere with the operation of the electrolyte. Copper wires were inserted into the ends of the dowels to which the copper and zinc windings were soldered. These end wires were either attached to, or formed into, hooks and eyes for attaching to other cells. This arrangement is depicted in figure 2. These attachments provided the electrical connections as well as the mechanical linkages.

Each cell was connected to the next with the copper winding of one being connected to the zinc winding of the next and so on. The cells could be connected end-to-end, or for a more compact assembly side-by-side, in the manner of links in a chain. The voltage delivered by the assembly was controlled by the number of links thus incorporated and could become quite high, even though the current available was no more than from a single cell (to increase the current, the size of the cells must be increased). The shock delivered by such chains was described as "strong" for one chain of 120 links, and as "sharp" for another of 50 links.

Prior to use, the chain was soaked in vinegar so that the electrolyte was absorbed into the wooden dowels. The wood of which the dowels were made was chosen to be a very porous type so that the amount of electrolyte absorbed was maximised. The chain would continue to produce a voltage until the dowels dried out, then the chain would have to be resoaked. Typically, the chain would be charged by slowly drawing it through a bowl of vinegar as shown in figure 4.

A special link could be included in the chain which incorporated an interrupter circuit. The purpose of the interrupter is to rapidly connect and disconnect the circuit so that the normally steady current of the battery is turned into a rapidly varying current. The usual practice in the use of medical electrical batteries was to feed the output of the interrupter to an induction coil in order to increase the voltage applied to the patient by transformer action. In Pulvermacher's patent however, there is no mention of using induction coils. The Pulvermacher battery could produce large voltages merely by adding more links to the chain. However, the interrupter still had an effect in that an interrupted current produces a stronger sensation of electric shock in the patient than a steady current. A novel feature of Pulvermacher's interrupter was that it was operated by the action of a vibrating spring kept in motion by the movements of the patient without the need for any external input. Interrupters of the time typically had to be hand-cranked by the physician, although there were already some in existence using electro-mechanical automatic interrupters. Later versions of the Pulvermacher chain used clockwork driven interrupters whose rate of interruption could be adjusted so that the rate of shock to the patient could be controlled. Such a clockwork interrupter is fitted to the chain shown in figure 1. It is wound up by turning the handle at the left end.

By 1869 a variant of this chain had appeared. In this the wooden dowels were dispensed with, and instead a hollow tube of zinc or magnesium was used. The zinc tube itself formed the anode of the cell, and over this was wound the copper wire cathode, or in yet another version, rings of copper plates. The zinc tube and copper wire were kept apart by stitches of thread. Magnesium was not commonly used by battery manufacturers of the time due to its very high price (unlike today) compared to zinc. However, a cell made with magnesium in place of zinc produces around twice the voltage. More importantly for Pulvermacher, the cell would still output some voltage if the electrolyte was replaced with plain water. Pulvermacher marketed a type of chain that was designed to be worn wrapped around a limb being treated and was claimed to operate with body sweat acting as the electrolyte and no need to charge it with electrolyte from an external source. Pulvermacher also produced a smaller "pocket version" of the chain which had fewer links than the full 120-cell version.

== Isaac Lewis Pulvermacher ==
Isaac Lewis Pulvermacher was a physicist and inventor originally concerned with the electric telegraph. He first published details of his chain in August 1850 in German and in the winter of that same year came to Britain to demonstrate the machine to notable physicians. He visited London and Edinburgh on this trip. He gives his residence as Breslau, Kingdom of Prussia in his 1853 US patent. Prior to this, however, he had arrived in Britain from Vienna and all the British sources of the time describe him as "of Vienna".

== Medical opinion ==
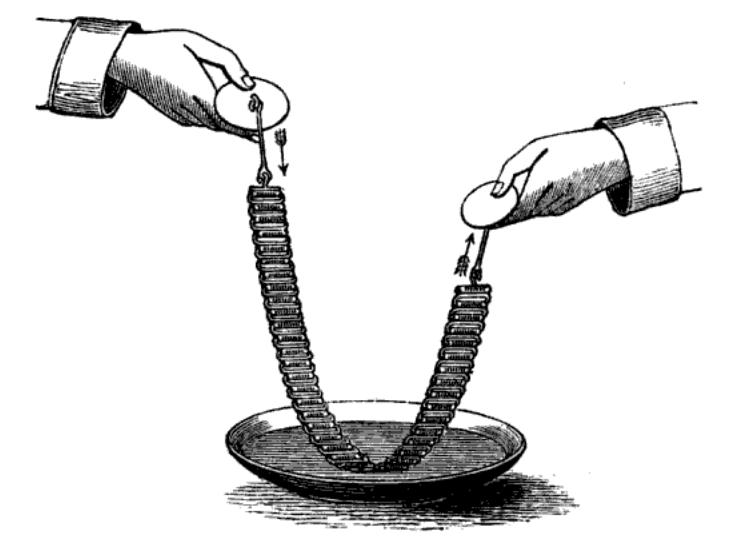
Fig. 4. Charging the chain by slowly drawing through vinegar.

At first, there was a very positive reaction to Pulvermacher. Early in 1851 Pulvermacher gave Golding Bird, a well known London physician with an interest in electrotherapy, a sample of the machine with which to experiment. Bird was impressed enough with it that he later gave a representative of the Pulvermacher Company a testimonial as a letter of introduction to physicians in Edinburgh. Bird thought that the battery would make a useful source of portable electricity and could be used for treating patients with some forms of paralysis in their homes. Contemporary equipment was not very portable, and in the case of friction machines required skilled operators to keep going. By October 1851 Bird felt that he had tested the device sufficiently to give it a glowing article in The Lancet. But even at this early stage there were signs of disquiet. Even as he wrote the favourable report in The Lancet Bird felt the need to level criticism at the Pulvermacher Company's London agent, one C. Meinig, for promoting the device as a "universal panacea" for almost any imaginable complaint in the company's advertisements. Bird was a tireless opponent of quack practitioners, and was particularly quick to criticise medically unqualified electrical treatment, as he felt this was a reason professional acceptance of his own work in electrotherapy was being held back. The quack practitioner market was the very sector that the Pulvermacher Company's unrestrained claims were aimed at. Nevertheless, Bird was gracious enough to specifically exclude Pulvermacher himself from responsibility for these "injudiciously puffed" claims.

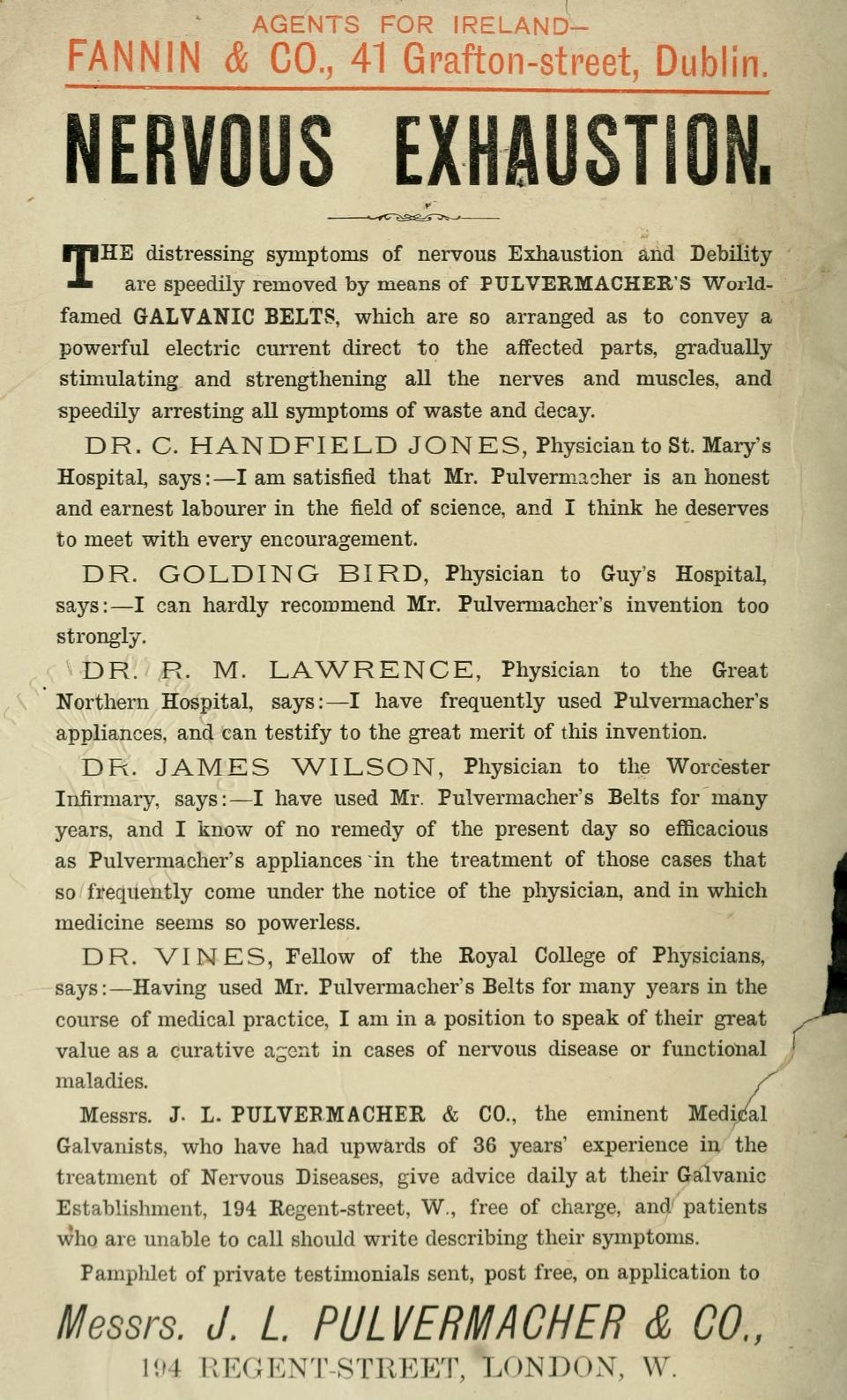
1886 advertisement in the Irish Journal of Medical Science

By April 1853 the situation had become very acrimonious. Meinig had been using extracts from the testimonial provided by Bird without permission in order to bolster the Company's, medically largely unsupported, quack advertising claims. Bird threatened a legal injunction but Meinig refused to desist and tried to imply that Bird was benefitting from the publicity. A letter writing campaign by one Dr. McIntyre against the Pulvermacher advertisements led to an exchange of letters in the Association Medical Journal. Bird made plain that he had only ever recommended the chain as a convenient source of electricity and did not support any of the claimed curative powers, most especially those that were supposed to produce instant results (a typical course of electrotherapy at the time could last several months). He criticised some of the chains being sold as delivering "too feeble" a current to be of any medical use and pointed out that the proposed procedure of wrapping the device around an affected limb would make it useless since a conductive path through the skin across each cell would prevent a useful voltage being developed at the terminals (Pulvermacher even suggests in his patent that contact with the body generates enough electricity to be effective even without electrolyte). This resulted in the Journal removing the Pulvermacher advertisements from its pages. The Association Medical Journal was quickly followed by the Medical Times and with growing pressure on The Lancet to do the same this pretty much ended professional medical support for the device, at least for the time being.

Despite this inauspicious start with the medical profession, the Pulvermacher chain continued to be described in scientific and medical journals and books as a useful tool throughout the late 1850s and 1860s, even being mentioned in the proceedings of the Royal Society. Even Bird, at the height of his dispute with the Pulvermacher company found himself able to say "the battery of Pulvermacher is an ingenious and useful source of electricity..." Although banned from much of the medical press, the Pulvermacher Company did not restrain its advertising claims or its use of notable names. The College of Dentists (of England) investigated its possible use as an anaesthetic during tooth extraction but found no benefit, with the device frequently adding to the pain. In 1869, the Pulvermacher Company again found itself the subject of discussion in the medical press when they were involved in legal proceedings. This time the company was itself the victim of quacks when its product was pirated with poor quality imitations and this was the cause of the court case. The Medical Times was prompted by this to examine the efficacy of the Pulvermacher chain ending a long period of the paper ignoring it as a worthless quack instrument. The result was a very positive review of the chain's function and the reviewer particularly praised the workmanship.

== Competition and decline ==
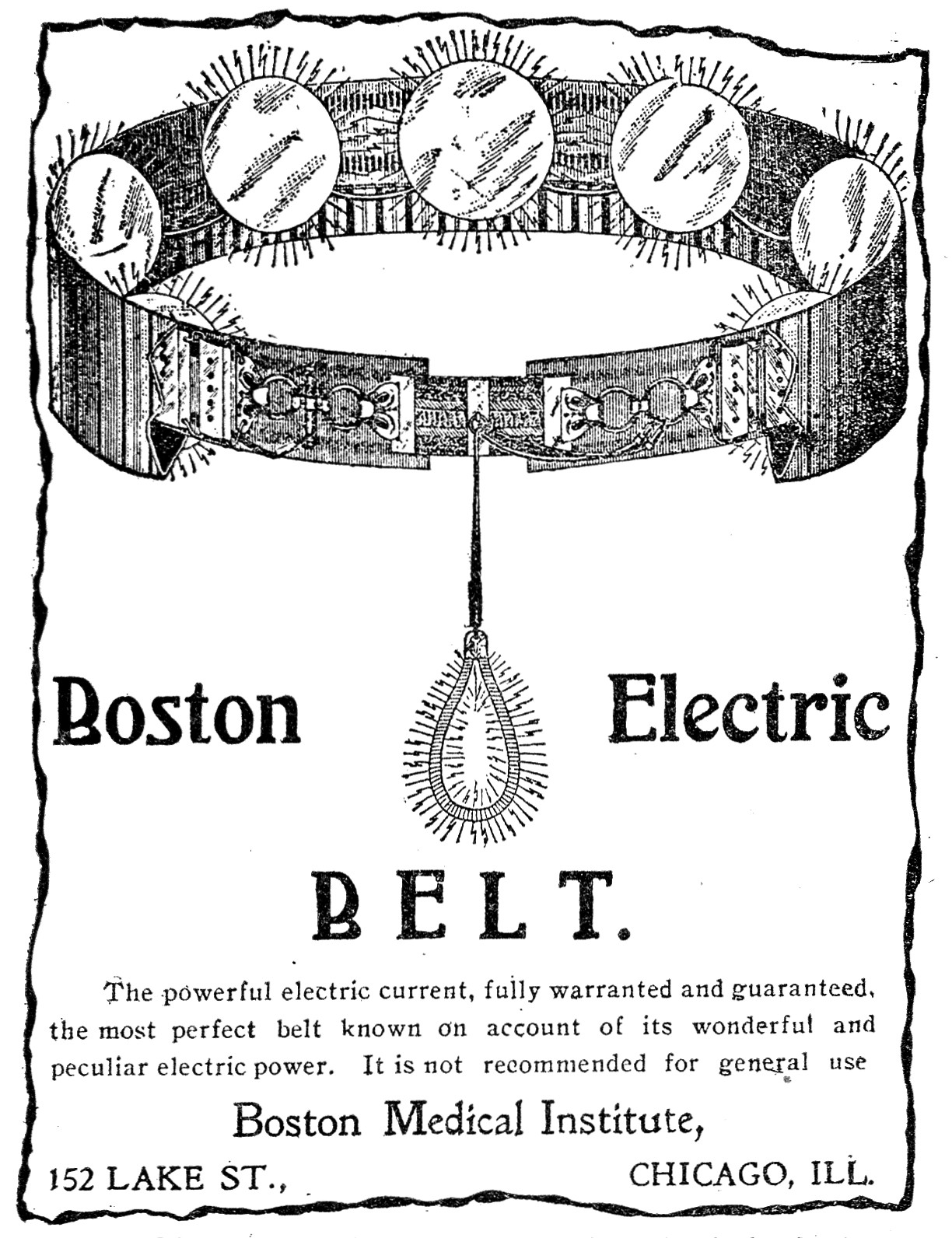
Boston Electric Belt, a competitor

Pulvermacher patented the chain battery in the US in 1853. This was soon followed by the wearable chain battery belt, or electric belt. Electric belts became enormously popular in the US, far more so than in Europe. This led to the company headquarters being moved to Cincinnati by the 1880s as the Pulvermacher Galvanic Company, but still calling themselves Pulvermacher's of London for the prestige of a European connection. Early models had to be soaked in vinegar before use as in England, but later on models that worked purely by galvanic action with body sweat were introduced. Since the device was being sold essentially as a quack cure it was only necessary to generate enough electricity that the wearer could feel it, no matter how slightly, and know that it was working.

Electric belts were made for every conceivable part of the human anatomy: limbs, abdomen, chest, neck – sometimes all worn at the same time. Pulvermacher even had a model designed to attach to the male genitals in a special sac which was claimed to cure impotence and erectile dysfunction. Pulvermacher promoted a theory that loss of "male vigour" in later life was a consequence of masturbation in early life and that a limited supply of semen, which provided the vigour, would run out before time if wasted. Pulvermacher's device was meant to address this shortcoming.

Competition was very intense for this lucrative market and the claimed benefits became ever more extravagant. Amongst Pulvermacher's many competitors in the US were the German Electric Belt Company (actually New York based), Dr Crystal's, Dr. Horn's, Addison's, Edson's, Edison's, Owen's and Heidelberg's. Edison's was founded by Thomas Edison Junior, whose father was the famous Thomas Edison. Owen's was originally New York based but expanded across the country until they were put out of business due to fraud. In Europe too, there were competitors. The Medical Battery Company of England made a popular belt. They attempted (unsuccessfully) to sue the Electrical Review when that paper accused them of quackery in 1892. The Iona Company, an Oregon-based company founded by Henry Gaylord Wilshire was still selling belts in 1926 and making large profits: $36,000 ($655,000 inflation adjusted) net from 2,445 belts in five months. By the end of the 1920s the electric belt's popularity had severely declined (but not the public's appetite for other quack electric cures) and the scientific market had long since moved on to better electrical generation technology than chain batteries.

== Popular culture ==
The Pulvermacher chain, especially in the form of one being worn on the body, was very familiar in the late 19th and early 20th century and would not have needed to be explained to an audience. For instance, there are references to it in the novel Madame Bovary when the character Homais wearing a number of Pulvermacher chains is described as "more bandaged than a Scythian".

== Bibliography ==
- Coley, N. G. (October 1969). "The collateral sciences in the work of Golding Bird (1814-1854)". Medical History. 13 (4).
- Hemat, R. A. S. (2009). Water. Urotext. ISBN 1-903737-12-5.
- Lardner, Dionysius (1856). Electricity, Magnetism, and Acoustics. London: Spottiswoode & Co.
- Moritz, Meyer (1869). Electricity in its Relations to Practical Medicine. New York: D. Appleton and Co.
- Peña, Carolyn Thomas de la (2005). The Body Electric: How Strange Machines Built the Modern American. New York and London: New York University Press. ISBN 0-8147-1983-X.
- Powell, George Denniston (1869). The Practice of Medical Electricity. Dublin: Fannin & Co.
- US 9571, Pulvermacher, Isaac Lewis, "Improvement in voltaic batteries and apparatus for medical and other purposes", issued 1 February 1853
- Schlesinger, Henry (2010). The Battery: How Portable Power Sparked a Technological Revolution. Washington: Smithsonian Books. ISBN 0-06-144293-3.
