= Cheerful Moments =

American mail-order magazine

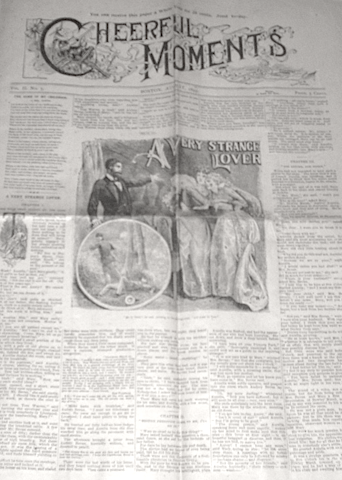
1893 issue

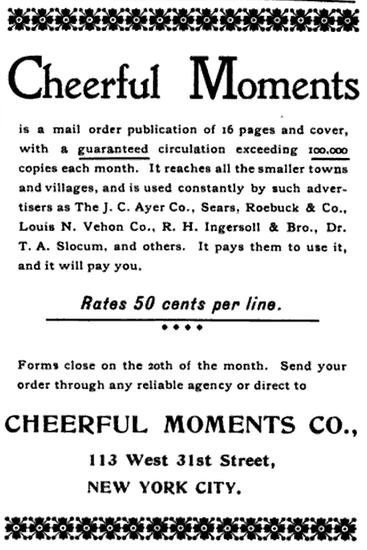
1899 publishers' advertisement

Cheerful Moments was an American monthly mail-order magazine from 1892 until 1908, primarily a vehicle for advertising and light stories of the day, and one of a number of similar publications.

The magazine was founded in Boston in 1892. It was later acquired by George W. Willis of New York, who worked in the field of mail order publications for over 25 years. It claimed an average monthly circulation that reached up to claims of 500,000 copies by 1903.

In December 1901, Advertising Experience described the most recent issue as "pretty much all advertising" where the "reading matter is simply an incidental but what there is of it is good."

A contemporary textbook on advertising listed Cheerful Moments in a list of typical mail-order magazine of the day:

The American Farm World, Cheerful Moments, Woman's World, Homefolks, Comfort, The Gentlewoman, Good Stories, the Metropolitan and Rural Home, Spare Moments, the American Nation, and the Fireside Visitor are a few of the long list of low-priced monthly publications of large circulation that are filled with stories and reading matter of general character and that reach the great rural and semiurban field.

It appears that Gaylord Wilshire took over the magazine by mid-1906, and it ceased publishing after its subscription list was absorbed into his Wilshire's magazine in March 1908.
