= Arthur J. Cramp =

British-born American medical doctor, researcher, and writer (1872–1951)

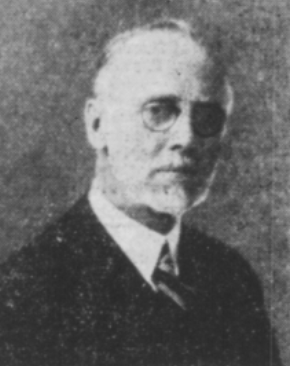
- Born: 10 September 1872; London, England
- Died: 25 November 1951 (aged 79); Hendersonville, North Carolina
- Education: Wisconsin College of Physicians and Surgeons
- Occupations: Medical Researcher and Writer
- Known for: Director of the Bureau of Investigation of the American Medical Association
- Spouse: Lillian Torrey
- Children: Torrey

Arthur Joseph Cramp (September 10, 1872 – November 25, 1951) was a medical doctor, researcher, and writer. He served as director of the American Medical Association's (AMA) Propaganda for Reform Department (later, the Bureau of Investigation and, then the Department of Investigation) from 1906 to 1936. He was a regular contributor to the Journal of the American Medical Association (JAMA). Cramp was "a bitter opponent of proprietary and medicinal abuses." His three volume series on 'Nostrums and Quackery', along with his public lectures to schools, professional groups, and civic organizations across the country, helped bring awareness to the problem of patent medicines or nostrums, by subjecting the claims (made by predominantly non-medical people) to scientific analysis. He was critical of the 1906 Pure Food and Drug Act, and advocated stronger regulation of product labeling and advertising. In an article announcing his death, the AMA called him "a pioneer in the fight against quackery and fraud in the healing arts."

== Early life and education ==
Arthur Joseph Cramp was born in London, England. His father was a commercial traveller. He received his "preliminary education" in England before moving to the United States in his late teens, around 1891.

Cramp, purportedly, decided to enter medical school after his infant daughter became ill and was treated by a quack. She subsequently died. Cramp received his training as a medical doctor from the Wisconsin College of Physicians and Surgeons at Milwaukee, where he graduated in 1906.

== Career ==
Cramp taught science at the high school level in Milwaukee, Wisconsin and at the Seminary and the Maryville, Missouri high school. He also worked at the Wisconsin Industrial School for Boys, a reformatory high school in Waukesha, Wisconsin before entering medical school. While at the Wisconsin College of Physicians and Surgeons, Cramp worked as an assistant in chemistry.

Cramp joined the American Medical Association staff in 1906 as an editorial assistant. He then became the Director for the newly-formed Propaganda for Reform Department. Cramp made it his mission to correspond with professionals and members of the public regarding medical treatments, products, and the business practices of individuals and companies involved in marketing them. His office also maintained a laboratory for testing various products. He wrote about many of these interactions and investigations in the Journal of the American Medical Association and Hygeia, a health magazine.

By 1910, Cramp's "Fake File," listing "products, firms, and names of promoters", contained over 12,000 entries. He kept a "Testimonial File" for doctors who endorsed proprietary drugs through testimonials; over 13,000 American doctors and 3,000 foreign doctors. His office became a clearing house for information regarding untested and, sometimes, dangerous practices. His department was aware of the health risks, as well as the financial losses to consumers who were duped by fake medicine vendors.

Cramp advocated truth in advertising, particularly for general consumption (patent) medicines containing "secret formulas," including alcohol. He and his office called for the standardization of medicines (ingredients and dosages) and educating the public on appropriate use. He wrote, "When the public is properly informed, so that it knows what preparations to call for in order to treat its simpler ailments, advertising of secret remedies will be entirely unnecessary." He considered the emotive nature of radio advertisements of quack medicine more harmful than newspaper advertisements. According to Cramp, unlike radio, newspapers had "developed standards of decency and censorship" when determining whether or not to run the advertisements. The Pure Food and Drug Act of 1906, followed by the 1912 Sherley Amendment, was an attempt to address these issues. However, Cramp warned that federal legislation attempting to address false advertising and interstate trafficking of products did not fully protect the public.

"No man has any moral right to so advertise as to make well persons think they are sick and sick persons thing they are very sick. Such advertising is an offense against the public health."

— Arthur J. Cramp

In 1936, Cramp retired from the Bureau due to ill health, after suffering from a heart attack in 1934. Upon hearing of his retirement, the British Medical Journal published this statement: "The quack nostrum trade is international in its activities, and the British medical profession owes a great debt to Dr. Cramp for providing it with the information necessary for combating both home-produced and imported frauds. We can only state our thanks and express the hope that he will enjoy the leisure he has earned by his many years of strenuous combat."

== Nostrums and quackery ==
In 1911, Cramp published the first of three volumes called Nostrums and Quackery, which would become "a veritable encyclopedia on the nostrum evil and quackery." The first volume contained the educational materials, case histories, and testimonials his department had been collecting.

Nostrums and Quackery, Volume II, published in 1921, was a collection of legal reports of case law involving nostrums and patent medicine reprinted from the Journal of the American Medical Association meant to educate the general public. As reviewer Joseph MacQueen stated, "The matter that appears has been prepared and written in no spirit of malice, and with no object except that of laying before the public certain facts, the knowledge of which is essential to a proper concept of community health."

Cramp's Nostrums and Quackery and Pseudo-Medicine, Volume III, foreword by George H. Simmons, Editor Emeritus of the Journal of the American Medical Association, was published in 1936. As described in The Science News-Letter, the book contained "terse, simple and factual accounts of hundreds of nostrums and the ways of pseudo-medical practitioners." This volume, more condensed than the first two volumes, indexed 1,500 "remedies." W.A. Evans, in his review, wrote "When you have read this book you will consider credulity based on fiction rather drab."

A sampling of "quack cures" which Cramp included in his books and lectures: deafness "cures" (subjecting individuals with hearing loss to airplane nose-dives), beauty "cures" (hair dyes, freckle removers, and reducing lotions containing harmful ingredients or promoted with false claims about their efficacy),{ obesity "cures" (including tapeworms, products containing dinitrophenol, arsenic, and other dangerous substances), cancer "quackery" (alternate cancer therapies), "consumption cure quackery" (elixirs from a bottle whose "alleged cures for consumption are born weekly"), and the Wilshire I-ON-A-CO (a magnetic belt purported to cure cancer, Bright's disease and paralysis, pernicious anemia to health, deafness, muteness, and St. Vitus' dance).

"The remedy for the menace of the fake consumption cure is education – and more education. People are gullible not because they lack brains, but because they lack knowledge. Iteration and reiteration of the fundamental facts regarding the prevention and cure of tuberculosis is the only way of overcoming the present toll of human life taken by the consumption quack cure."

— Arthur J. Cramp

== Memberships ==
As reported in JAMA, Cramp was a member of the following:

- Associate Fellow of the American Medical Association
- Indiana State Medical Association
- Society of Medical History of Chicago
- Institute of Medicine of Chicago
- Royal Institute of Public Health
- Chicago Ornithology Society
- Phi Rho Sigma
- Chicago Library Club

== Personal life ==
Cramp was married to Lilly Torrey of Skidmore, Missouri, daughter of L.N. Torrey. They had a daughter, Torrey, who died on January 2, 1900. The infant's death was caused by seizures related to meningitis.

== Death ==
Cramp died on November 25, 1951, in Hendersonville, North Carolina. He was 79. The cause of death was, reportedly, arteriosclerosis and uremia.

== Selected articles ==
- Modern Advertising and the Nostrum (1918)
- The Nostrum and the Public Health (1919)
- Self-Doctoring (1920)
- Patent Medicines: What is a 'Patent Medicine' and Why? (1923)
- Patent Medicines: What Protection Does the National Food and Drugs Act Give? (1923)
- Therapeutic Thaumaturgy (1924)
- I-ON-A-CO – The Magic Horse Collar? (1927)
- The Nostrum and the Public Health (1929)
- The Bureau of Investigation of the American Medical Association (1931)
- The Work of the Bureau of Investigation (1933)
- Salts and Crystals Quackery (1935)

== Books ==
- Nostrums and Quackery: Articles on the Nostrum Evil, Quackery and Allied Matters Affecting the Public Health, Volume 1 (1912)
- Nostrums and Quackery: Articles on the Nostrum Evil, Quackery and Allied Matters Affecting the Public Health, Volume 2 (1921)
- Nostrums and Quackery and Pseudo-Medicine, Volume 3 (1936)
