= Lessons of October =

Text by Leon Trotsky

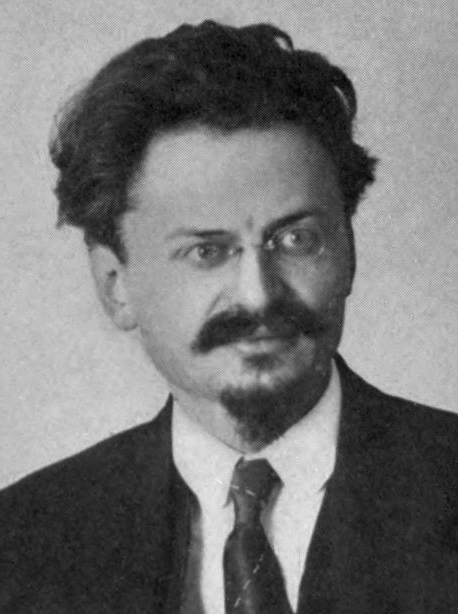
Leon Trotsky as he appeared shortly before the publication of Lessons of October.

Lessons of October (Russian: Уроки Октября) is a polemical essay of about 60 printed pages in length by Leon Trotsky, first published in Moscow in October 1924 as the preface to the third volume of his Collected Works. The essay was harshly critical of the purported revolutionary failings of Grigory Zinoviev and Lev Kamenev, two key members of the collective leadership which briefly ruled Soviet Russia in the months after the death of V. I. Lenin. Publication of the essay was used as a pretext for the Soviet leadership to isolate and attack Trotsky, whom the leadership mutually perceived as a threat to accede to supreme power.

In subsequent years Trotsky's essay was reprinted several times under its own covers by the international Trotskyist movement.

== Publication history ==
=== Background ===
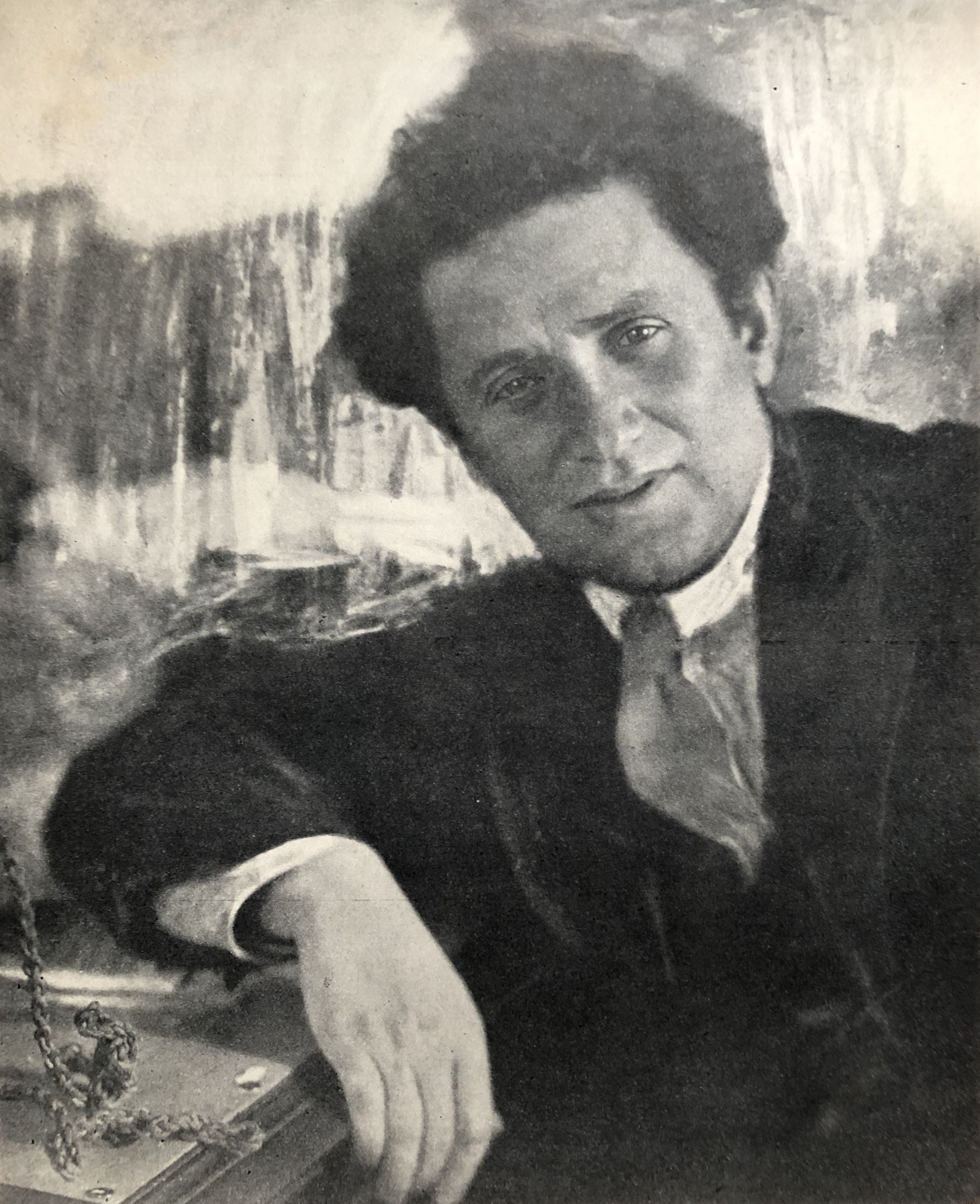
Chief of the Comintern Grigory Zinoviev (1883–1936) was regarded by many Communists of the day as the leading claimant to supreme leadership following the death of Lenin in 1924.

Following a series of strokes, which had incapacitated him for more than a year, Soviet leader V.I. Lenin died on January 21, 1924, at the age of 53. Despite his chronic illness, Lenin's premature death nevertheless came as a shock both to the people of the Soviet Union and to the small circle of individuals who collectively ruled in his stead through the governing Central Committee of the Russian Communist Party (bolsheviks) [RKP(b)] and its inner executive committee, the Politburo.

A triumvirate wielded effective power from the time of Lenin's second health breakdown in December 1922, which effectively eliminated his participation in day-to-day operational affairs. This trio included Grigory Zinoviev, a close associate of Lenin's for more than two decades who sat as the head of the Communist International; Zinoviev's co-thinker Lev Kamenev, acting chair of the formal Soviet state apparatus, the Council of People's Commissars and secretary of the Politburo; and Joseph Stalin, secretary of the Organization Bureau of the RKP(b), in charge of party affairs and the assignment of party workers to various tasks. Standing aloof from these was the orator and journalist Leon Trotsky, who had returned from North American exile to join the Bolsheviks early in 1917 to be placed in positions of trust at Lenin's right hand.

It would ultimately be Trotsky, as the flamboyant chairman of the Petrograd Soviet, who would play a leading role in the October Revolution which brought the Bolshevik Party to power; Stalin would play a lesser and more administrative part. As for Zinoviev and Kamenev, the pair stood aloof from the revolutionary uprising entirely, jointly distancing themselves from a forthcoming Bolshevik seizure of power in the pages of a Menshevik newspaper. This would prove to be a massive miscalculation that would undercut Zinoviev's and Kamenev's later efforts to achieve leadership of the Russian Communist Party and the Soviet republic.

All of these four maintained a desire and made active efforts to win for themselves the mantle of leadership. The three Old Bolsheviks — Zinoviev, Stalin, and Kamenev — were filled with personal antipathy towards the long-time outsider, Trotsky. Each of the four sought to demonstrate the righteousness of their claims not just through the crass craft of political organization for factional warfare, but also through theoretical acumen. Each began the feverish publication of new works of sociology or Marxist theory or collected their contemporary journalism in an effort to prove themselves able theoreticians. Trotsky, in an effort to prove his credentials as a theoretician, even launched a multi-volume publishing project for the release of his Sochineniia (Collected Works) involving the State Publishing House.

It would be this publishing effort amidst this highly personalized faction fight that would lead to the publication of the polemical essay "Lessons of October."

=== Publication ===
The essay "Lessons of October" first appeared as the foreword to the two part volume on 1917 that was part of Trotsky's Collected Works, published by the State Publishing House.

=== Reaction ===
On January 18, 1925, a plenary meeting of the Central Committee of the RKP(b) was called to address the so-called "Trotsky Question". Feeling isolated and discredited among the top leadership, Trotsky decided to resign his position as People's Commissar of War rather than to attempt to marshal his forces for a hopeless fight at the Central Committee plenum.

In a lengthy letter of resignation, Trotsky explicitly denied that "Lessons of October" had been published furtively or that it represented a "platform" for a formal opposition faction, as his detractors contended:

"In so far as a formal pretext for the latest discussion was found in the foreword to my book on 1917, I consider it my duty, first of all, to refute the accusation that I had published the book without the knowledge of the Central Committee. In point of fact, this book was printed during my rest cure in the Caucasus, exactly in the same way as all the other books written by me or by any members of the Central Committee or of the party. Of course, it is the business of the Central Committee to establish some form of control over party publications, and I never had cause or inclination to avoid such control.

"The foreword [on] 'The Lessons of October' contains the development of those ideas which I have expressed before and especially during the last year.... It goes without saying that in analyzing the October Revolution in connection with the German events, I never dreamed of creating a separate 'platform' or ever entertained the idea that my work would be interpreted in that sense."

Trotsky's resignation was unanimously accepted by the Central Committee at the January 18 session, which he did not attend. Efforts there by Zinoviev and Kamenev to remove Trotsky from the Politburo and to expel him from the party were turned aside, however.

The resolution passed by the Central Committee on January 18 demanded that Trotsky demonstrate "submission to party discipline, not only in words but also in deeds," to issue an unconditional renunciation of his criticisms, and threatened his removal from Communist Party leadership in the event he made "new attempts to violate, or failed to carry out" party decisions. A campaign to "enlighten" the party and the non-party population about the purported anti-Bolshevik nature of Trotskyism was announced.

== See also ==
- List of books by Leon Trotsky

== English language editions ==
Source: Louis Sinclair, Trotsky: A Bibliography. Aldershot, England: Scolar Press, 1989; vol. 2, pg. 1243.

- The Lessons of October 1917. Translation by Susan Lawrence and I. Olshan. London: Labour Publishing Co., 1925.
- Lessons of October. Translation by John G. Wright. New York: Pioneer Press, 1937.
- Lessons of October. Translation by John G. Wright. London: New Park, Sept. 1971.
- Lessons of October. Colombo, Ceylon: Young Socialist Publication, March 1974.
- "The Lessons of October," in Leon Trotsky, The Challenge of the Left Opposition (1923-25). Translation by John G. Wright. New York: Pathfinder Press, 1975; pp. 199–258.
