= Ionaco =

1920s electric belt

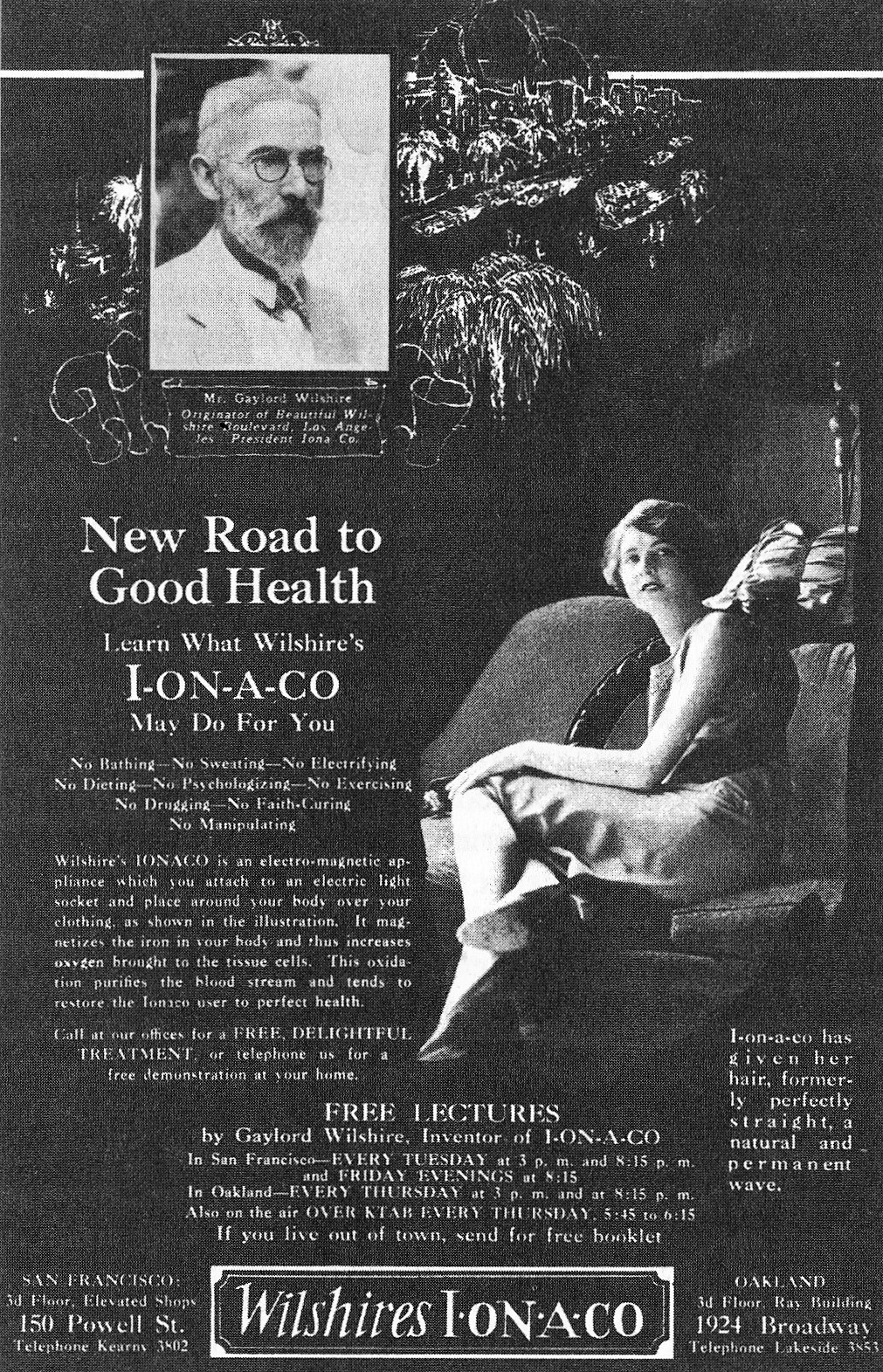
An advertisement for the Ionaco

The Ionaco (often stylized as I-on-a-co or I-ON-A-CO) was an electric belt developed by Gaylord Wilshire after his career in politics. It was advertised during the 1920s as a curing device but was dismissed by contemporary medical experts as quackery.

== Background ==
Some historians have offered different theories on Wilshire's decision to work on the Ionaco. Carolyn Thomas de la Peña wrote that it could have been to make up for Wilshire's political failures. Donald G. Davis noted that Wilshire had severe headaches which doctors in the United States and Europe failed to cure. Davis argued that Wilshire was motivated to enter the medical field to find a cure to his own condition.

At the age of 64, Wilshire turned from his work in real estate to focus on the area of public health. He explored radium-infused garments, electric heating pads, and distributed a special kind of health bread called "Ex-cell-o" before working on his electric belt. This title likely inspired the name for his belt, the "I-on-a-co". He first recorded his theory for "the radiation cure" in 1924. An early idea for this cure was a magnetic turban for head use.

== History ==
Wilshire developed the "Life Belt" for 15 years starting in 1910. He tried it on himself in 1925, and it reportedly cured his condition. He started giving the belt to his relatives and friends, who also reported positive results. About 50,000 devices were sold between 1925 and 1927.

Wilshire established the Iona Company with general offices in Los Angeles. Agencies for this company spread throughout the Pacific Coast and metropolitan areas of the United States. Sales for the Ionaco reached a peak in the fall of 1926, and the company attempted to establish agents in Europe. By 1927 the company had 23 regional offices and around 70 demonstrators.

Several health organizations started to investigate the Ionaco during this time, including the Public Health League of Washington, the Better Business Bureau of Seattle, and the Rockefeller Institute of Medical Research. On 18 November 1926 Wilshire challenged the California medical profession to investigate his device in a full-page advertisement in the Los Angeles Times. Wilshire's letter opened with "Gentlemen: Since 1925, I have been advertising my inventing, the I-ON-A-CO, in practically all the leading newspapers in California," and continued "I have made such statements as 'If you are suffering from pain— no matter what the cause— one treatment may bring complete relief, as it has in hundreds of cases.' 'Eczema relieved over-night.' 'High blood pressure- we reduce it in one treatment.' 'Neuritis relieved in 10 minutes.'... If the medical profession investigates and ascertains that I am a charlatan and the I-ON-A-CO is a fake, then it has no alternative than to denounce me. On the other hand, if the medical profession discovers that the I-ON-A-CO does produce results claimed for it, then the I-ON-A-CO should be recognized as having a definite therapeutic value." Arthur J. Cramp of the American Medical Association (AMA) responded to Wilshire's letter with an article that critically analyzed the claims regarding the Ionaco. This eventually led to a decline in device sales in the summer of 1927. The Iona Company dissolved following Wilshire's death in 1927, though sellers continued to promote the Ionaco throughout the 1930s and 1940s.

== Design ==
Wilshire's concept for his electric belt and his theory of electromagnetic health was influenced by Otto Heinrich Warburg's study of iron in the blood. According to Wilshire, the device's magnetic field was supposed to increase the body's absorption of oxygen to free the body from toxic diseases. The belt was marketed as both a health-improving device and a cure for most diseases; including cancer, diabetes, tuberculosis, arthritis, neuritis, and insomnia.

The interior had a thick coil of insulated wire that generated a weak magnetic field. It also had a smaller wire coil with a flashlight globe that would light up when placed close to the thick coil. The exterior of the belt was covered by a thick layer of leather. It was roughly 15 to 18 inches (38 to 46 cm) in diameter, and wide enough to fit over the shoulder of a grown adult. It weighed about 6.5 pounds (2.9 kg).

== Marketing ==
Advertisements for the electric belt relied on testimonials published in newspapers and aired on the radio. The AMA investigated these claims, some of which were attributed to well-known physicians, and found that many of the quotations had been falsified. Wilshire and his company marketed the electric device to those most likely to use it, including phone subscribers and power plant customers. Distributors covered certain regions to promote the device by demonstrations and door-to-door sales. In-house sales associates called demonstrators provided both paid and free treatments for potential buyers.

Each Ionaco belt cost $3.50 (equivalent to $64 in 2025) to manufacture, and each belt was sold for $65 (equivalent to $1,182 in 2025), though it could also be purchased on credit for $5 (equivalent to $91 in 2025) a month.

== Legacy ==
In 1928 Philip Ilsey, the former manager of the Iona Company in Cleveland, started marketing an Ionaco clone called the Theronoid. Similar electric belt imitations appeared during this time, and were given names such as the "Ionizer", or the "Restoro". Such imitations continued to be sold on the market even after promoters stopped marketing the Ionaco in the 1940s.

Contemporary health experts dismissed the Ionaco and its spin-offs as quackery. In 1932, the physician Morris Fishbein commented:

Gaylord Wilshire sold these devices for $55 cash or $65 on time payments, and thousands of them were sold by his methods of promotion. Shortly after the development of the device Wilshire himself died of a disease of the kidney in a New York hospital, no doubt without the benefit of his own invention. He was a remarkable charlatan.

Two Ionacos were reportedly displayed at the Los Angeles County Medical Association Library in 1985. According to the library's curator, Wilshire apparently believed in his belt, but its purported health benefits just came from people's belief in its efficacy.

== See also ==
- Pulvermacher's chain
