= Frederic Heath =

American socialist politician and journalist

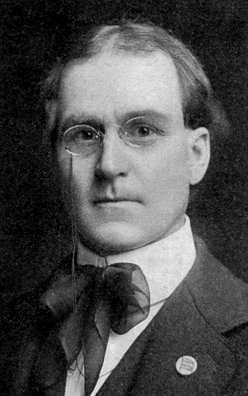
- Heath c. 1903

Member of the Milwaukee County Board of Supervisors
- In office 1910–1948

Member of the Milwaukee Board of School Directors
- In office 1909–1910

Member of the Milwaukee Common Council
- In office 1904–1906

Personal details
- Born: September 6, 1864 Milwaukee, Wisconsin, U.S.
- Died: June 12, 1954 (aged 89) Wisconsin, U.S.
- Resting place: Wauwatosa Cemetery, Wauwatosa, Wisconsin
- Party: Socialist
- Spouse: Elizabeth Brown Dorethy
- Children: 2
- Occupation: Journalist

Frederic Faries Heath (September 6, 1864 – June 12, 1954) was an American socialist politician and journalist who was a founding member of the Social Democratic Party of America in 1897 and the Socialist Party of America in 1901. He was an elected official in Wisconsin for nearly half a century.

== Biography ==
=== Early years ===
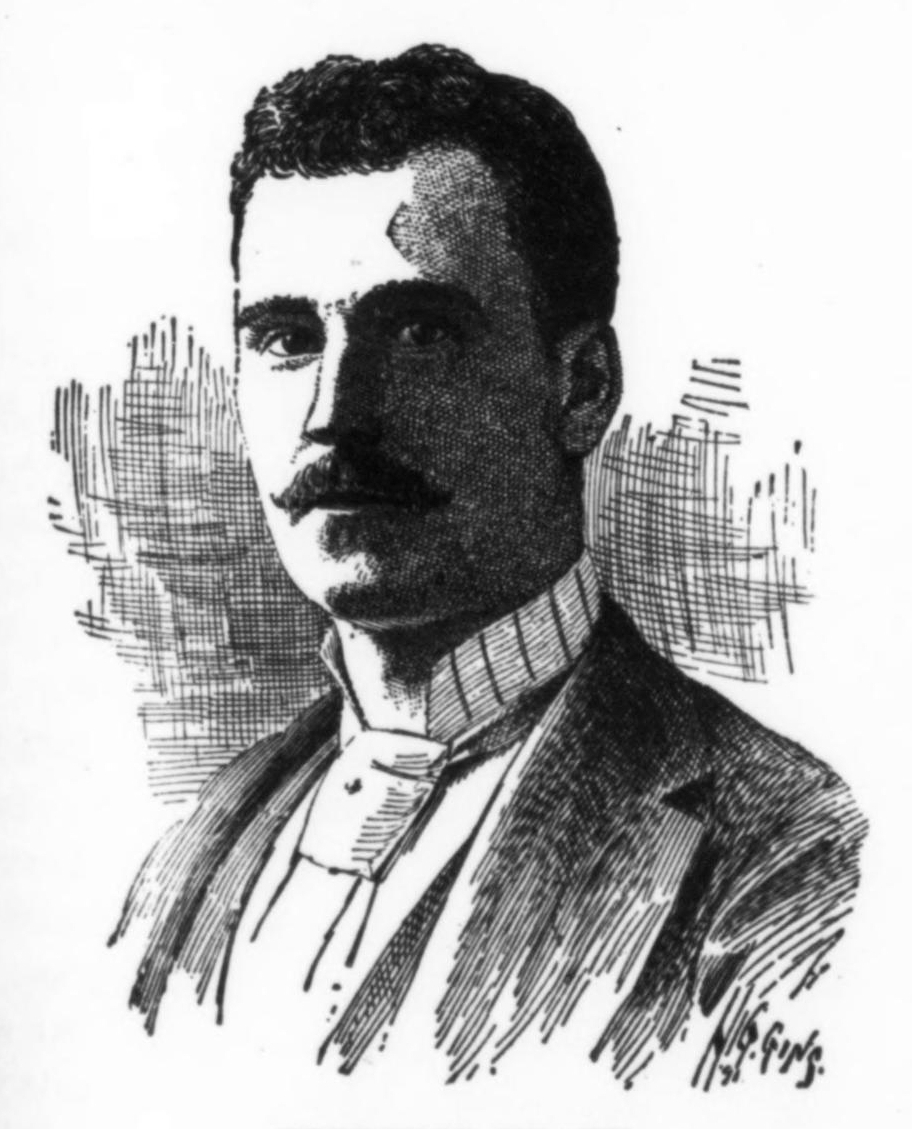
Heath as a reporter for the Milwaukee Sentinel, 1892

Frederic F. Heath was born September 6, 1864, to a Republican family in Milwaukee, Wisconsin. As a young man, Heath worked variously as a teacher, a printer, a wood engraver, and an artist for wood engravers, the latter trades rendered largely obsolete by the invention of the linotype machine and the half-tone printing process. He moved to Chicago in 1886, moving to Florida in 1887 to publish a magazine called the Florida Fruit Grower. In 1888 he returned to his native Milwaukee, where he drew portraits and wrote editorials for the Milwaukee Daily Sentinel.

=== Socialist years ===
Heath later recalled that he had been won over to socialist ideas by Looking Backward, a popular utopian novel of Edward Bellamy published in 1888:

"I capitulated to it at once, and a few years later was the author of a series of reports of the sessions of a mythical Bellamy club, in a Chicago illustrated paper, of which I myself was editor, articles which afford me amusing reading today, you may believe. By this time I had come to think myself a socialist, yet kept on religiously voting for 'protection' of American industry."

Heath indicated that he was brought into the actual socialist movement through three influences: Julius Wayland and his newspaper The Coming Nation, forerunner to the Appeal to Reason; stray copies of literature produced by the Socialist Labor Party of America; and a direct acquaintance with Victor L. Berger, a former teacher who had become the editor of the German-language socialist daily newspaper in Milwaukee. Heath later wrote:

"The Milwaukee Socialist movement at that time was a large one, wholly outside the SLP (which was regarded as too narrow and stagnating), and was composed of German-Americans. The word got abroad among them that a Yankee had turned Socialist, and they began to see the beginning of the end! The great desire among the German Socialists in the country at that time was to have Socialism become native to the soil; for they saw that there could be no progress otherwise. To have the ice broken locally, therefore, by means of a real descendant of Pilgrim New England, was no everyday matter — so I learned later."

Heath was a cartoonist who contributed his work to the socialist press.

After being introduced to a regular meeting of German-American socialists by Berger as the "first Yankee Socialist in Milwaukee," the gathering conducted the remainder of its proceedings in English. Heath would remain close to Berger for the rest of Berger's life, crediting Berger with having played a great influence in mellowing the "fanaticism" of a "terribly academic" young convert to the socialist cause.

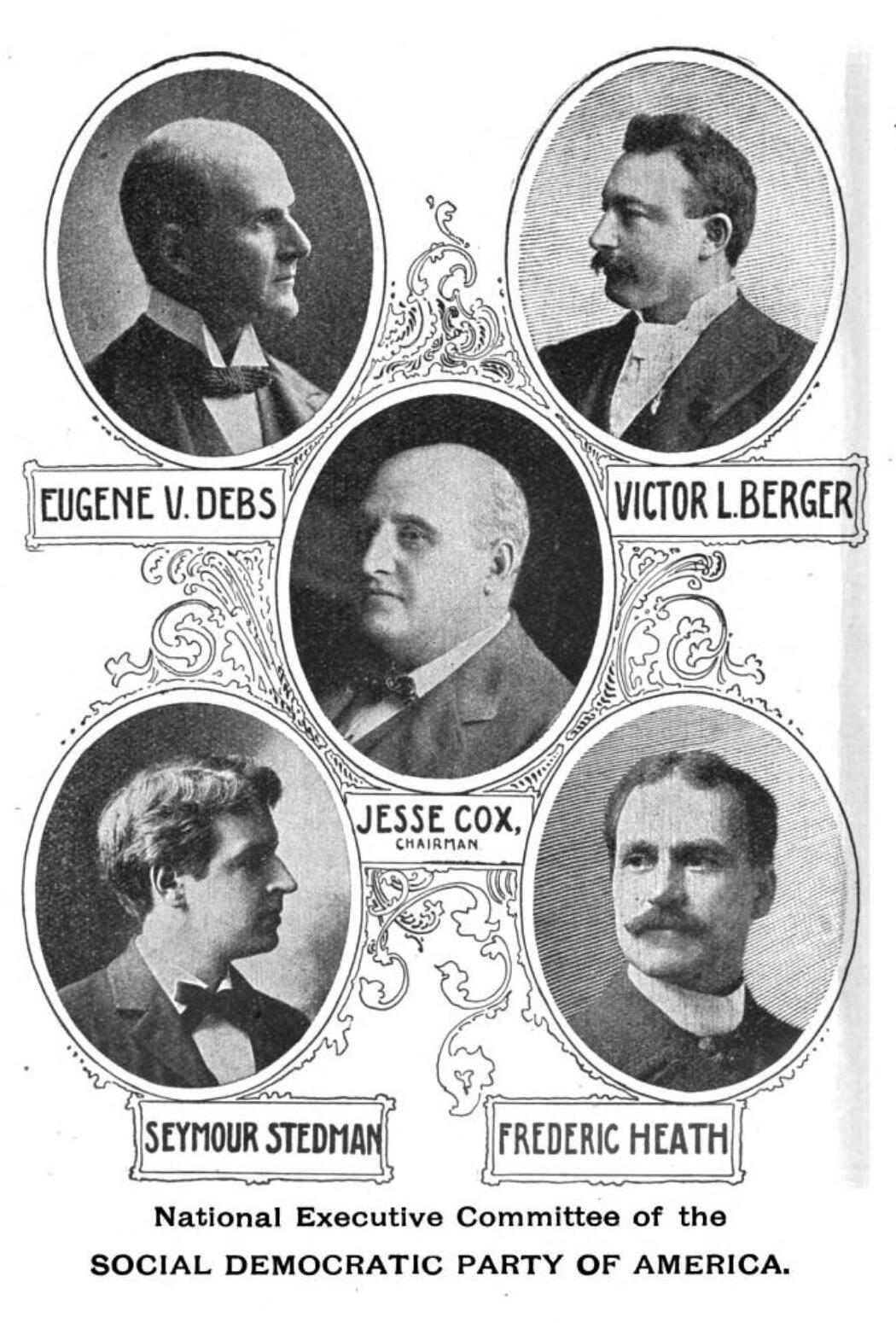
Members of the National Executive Committee of the SDP, 1900

Along with Berger and Eugene V. Debs, Heath helped to establish the Social Democracy of America in 1897, an organization which became the Social Democratic Party of America (SDP) the following year, by way of a split of Berger's minority "political action" wing from the majority, who favored the establishment of a socialist colony. Heath was the chairman of the meeting of seceders at which the new party was formed. Heath was elected a member of the National Executive Board of this new political party at its founding, a position that he continued to hold until the party dissolved itself in 1901 by merging with dissidents from the Socialist Labor Party headed by Morris Hillquit and Henry Slobodin to establish the Socialist Party of America. Heath played an active role in negotiating this unity as an official representative of the SDP during the previous year.

Cover motiff of the paperback edition of Heath's Social Democracy Red Book.

In 1900, Heath became one of the first historians of the Marxist movement in America when he authored a thin volume called Socialism in America (better known as Social Democracy Red Book). He wrote for (and later edited) the weekly newspaper of the SDP, the Social Democratic Herald, as well as producing material for other papers under various pen names. The Social Democratic Herald was moved to Milwaukee in August 1901, with Heath taking over as editor, and was published continually there as a weekly until the launch of Victor Berger's daily, the Milwaukee Leader in December 1911.

During the early 1920s, Heath was named editor of the Socialist Party's short-lived weekly newspaper based in Milwaukee, The New Day.

Heath was a member of the International Typographical Union and a founder and director of the Milwaukee Ethical Society.

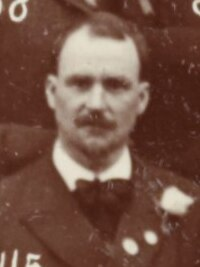
Heath at the first Socialist Party of America convention in Chicago, 1904

From 1904 to 1906, Heath served as a Milwaukee alderman. He was sat on the Milwaukee Board of School Directors from 1909–1910 and was a County Supervisor from 1910 to 1948.

Heath remained an active member of the Socialist Party throughout the greater part of the 1930s, attending the tumultuous 1937 party convention as a delegate from Wisconsin. Heath found the experience amidst highly ideological factional warriors to be deeply disconcerting, later writing that "leering, victorious Communists" had made a "complete capture of the movement" — an achievement "made possible by the arch-betrayer, Norman Thomas."

=== Death and legacy ===
Frederic F. Heath died in 1954.

== Works ==
- The Social Democracy Red Book. Progressive Thought no. 10. Terre Haute, IN: Debs Publishing Co., 1900.
- "How I Became a Socialist," The Comrade, April 1903.
- "Indiana Governor Incites Legion Lawlessness Toward Debs!" The New Day, vol. 4, no. 4, whole no. 86 (Jan. 28, 1922), pp. 25, 28.
- "'Let Them Come; I Fear No Man,' Debs Tells Indiana Governor," The New Day, vol. 4, no. 5, whole no. 87 (Feb. 4, 1922), pp. 37–38.
- "Exclusive Story of SP Convention Shows Collapse," The New Leader [New York], vol. 20, no. 14 (April 3, 1937), pp. 1–2.
