= Morris Fishbein =

American physician (1889–1976)

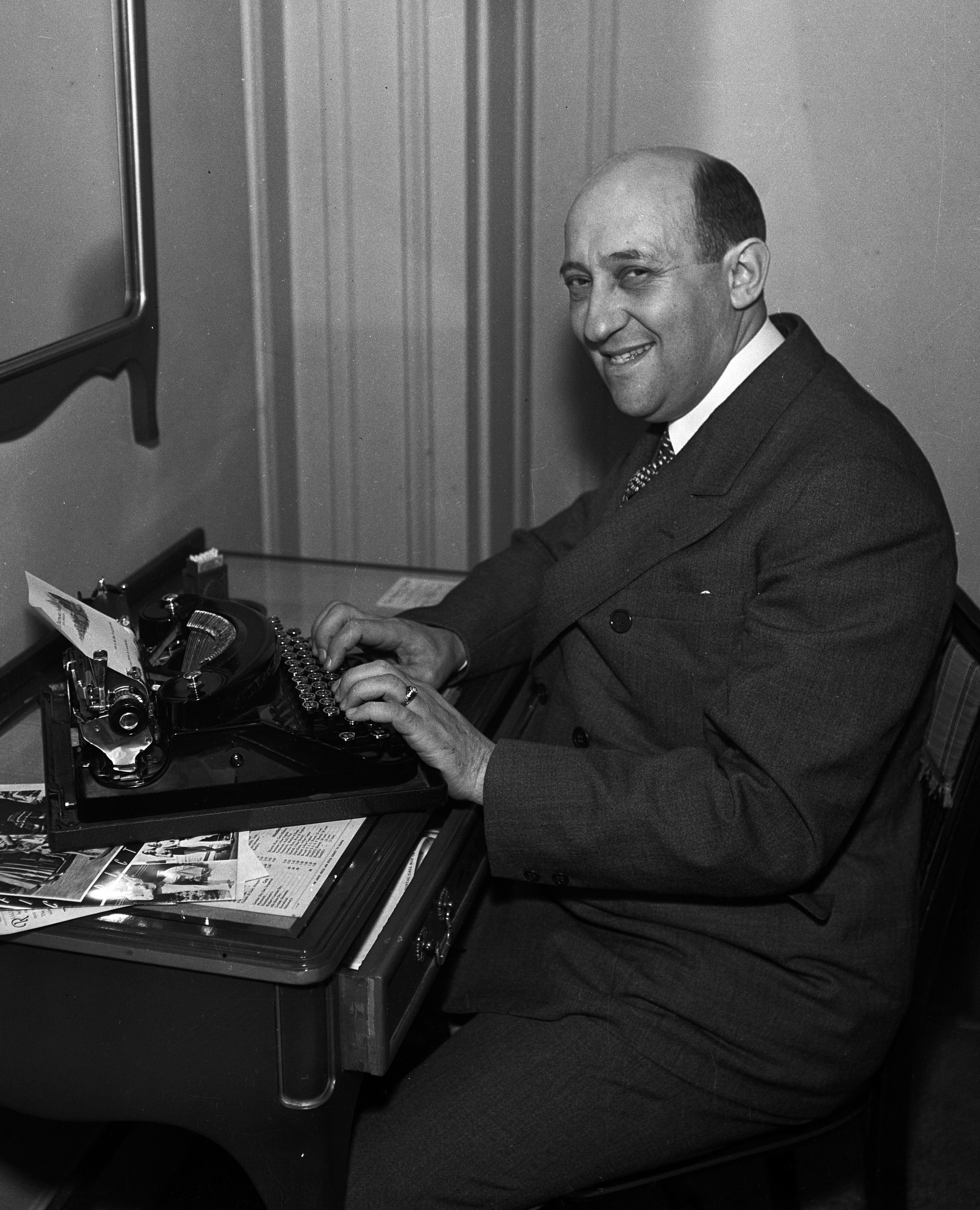
- Fishbein in 1935
- Born: July 22, 1889; St. Louis, Missouri
- Died: September 27, 1976 (aged 87); Chicago, Illinois
- Occupation: physician
- Employer: Journal of the American Medical Association
- Title: Editor
- Term: 1924-1950
- Spouse: Anna Mantel Fishbein

Morris Fishbein (July 22, 1889 – September 27, 1976) was an American physician and editor of The Journal of the American Medical Association (JAMA) from 1924 to 1950.

Ira Rutkow's Seeking the Cure: A History of Medicine in America provides a brief overview of Fishbein's influence on American medicine during the Interwar period.

Fishbein is vilified in the chiropractic community due to his principal role in founding and propagating the campaign to suppress and end chiropractic as a profession due to its basis in pseudoscientific practices.

== Biography ==
He was born in St. Louis, Missouri, on July 22, 1889, son of an immigrant Jewish peddler who moved his family to Indianapolis. He studied at Rush Medical College. Fishbein served for 18 months as a resident physician at the Durand Hospital for Infectious Diseases.

He joined George H. Simmons, editor of The Journal of the American Medical Association (JAMA), as an assistant and advanced to the editorship in 1924, a position he maintained until 1950. He was on the cover of Time on June 21, 1937. In 1938, along with the AMA, he was indicted for violating the Sherman Anti-Trust Act. The AMA was convicted and fined $2,500 but Fishbein was acquitted.

In 1961 he became the founding editor of Medical World News, a magazine for doctors. In 1970 he endowed the Morris Fishbein Center for the study of the history of science and medicine at the University of Chicago. Its first activity was a lecture series taking place in May of that year. Allen G. Debus served as director of the center from 1971 to 1977. Fishbein also endowed a chair at the university for the same subject, a chair taken up by Debus in 1978. The 7th floor in Shoreland Hall at the University of Chicago was known as Fishbein House.

He died on September 27, 1976, in Chicago, Illinois. He was survived by two daughters, Barbara Fishbein Friedell and Marjorie Clavey, and his son, Justin M. Fishbein.

== Quacks ==
He was also notable due to his affinity for exposing quacks, notably the goat-gland surgeon John R. Brinkley, and campaigning for regulation of medical devices. His book Fads and Quackery in Healing debunks homeopathy, osteopathy, chiropractic, Christian Science, radionics and other dubious medical practices.

In 1938, Fishbein authored a two-part article "Modern Medical Charlatans" in the journal Hygeia which criticized the quackery of Brinkley. Brinkley sued Fishbein for libel but lost the case. The jury found that Brinkley "should be considered a charlatan and a quack in the ordinary, well-understood meaning of those words." Fishbein responded that "the decision is a great victory for honest scientific medicine, for the standards of education and conduct established by the American Medical Association."

Fishbein was also critical of the activities of Mary Baker Eddy, whom he considered a fraud and plagiarist.

== Selected publications ==
- The Medical Follies (1925)
- The New Medical Follies (1927)
- Shattering Health Superstitions (1930)
- Fads and Quackery in Healing (1932)
- Frontiers of Medicine (1933)
- Your Diet and Your Health (1937)
- A History of the American Medical Association 1847 to 1947 (1947)
- Medical Writing: The Technic and the Art (1957)
- Morris Fishbein, M.D.: An Autobiography (1969)
- The Handy Home Medical Adviser (1974)

== See also ==
- Arthur J. Cramp
