= Social Democratic Party of America =

1898–1901 political party in United States

- Founded: June 11, 1898; 128 years ago
- Dissolved: July 28, 1901; 125 years ago
- Preceded by: Social Democracy of America
- Succeeded by: Socialist Party of America
- Ideology: Democratic socialism Social democracy
- Political position: Left-wing

The Social Democratic Party of America (SDP) was a short-lived political party in the United States established in 1898.

The group was formed out of elements of the Social Democracy of America (SDA) and was a predecessor to the Socialist Party of America which was established in 1901.

== Organizational history ==
=== Forerunners ===
Following the defeat of the 1894 American Railway Union (ARU) strike, the former populist Eugene V. Debs exhaustively read socialist literature provided to him by Milwaukee publisher Victor L. Berger and other independent socialists. Debs converted to the socialist cause, believing in the aftermath of the suppression of the ARU strike by federal troops that trade union action alone was insufficient to bring about the liberation of the working class.

In this same summer, smarting from a failed effort at establishing a socialist community near Tennessee City, Tennessee, publisher Julius Wayland established in Kansas City a new socialist weekly newspaper, Appeal to Reason, eventually moving the operation for financial reasons to a small town in southeastern Kansas called Girard. This paper was a major success, quickly gaining a paid subscribership of 80,000 and invigorating the socialist movement. A new colonization project was conceived through this paper, the Brotherhood of the Cooperative Commonwealth, which aimed to seed an undecided western state with socialist colonies and to electorally take over the government of that state, thus establishing a foothold for socialism in America. Debs was named the head of this project and the planets were thus aligned for the formation of a new national political organization. A convention of the remnant of the American Railway Union was called for June 15, 1897, in Chicago.

=== Formation ===
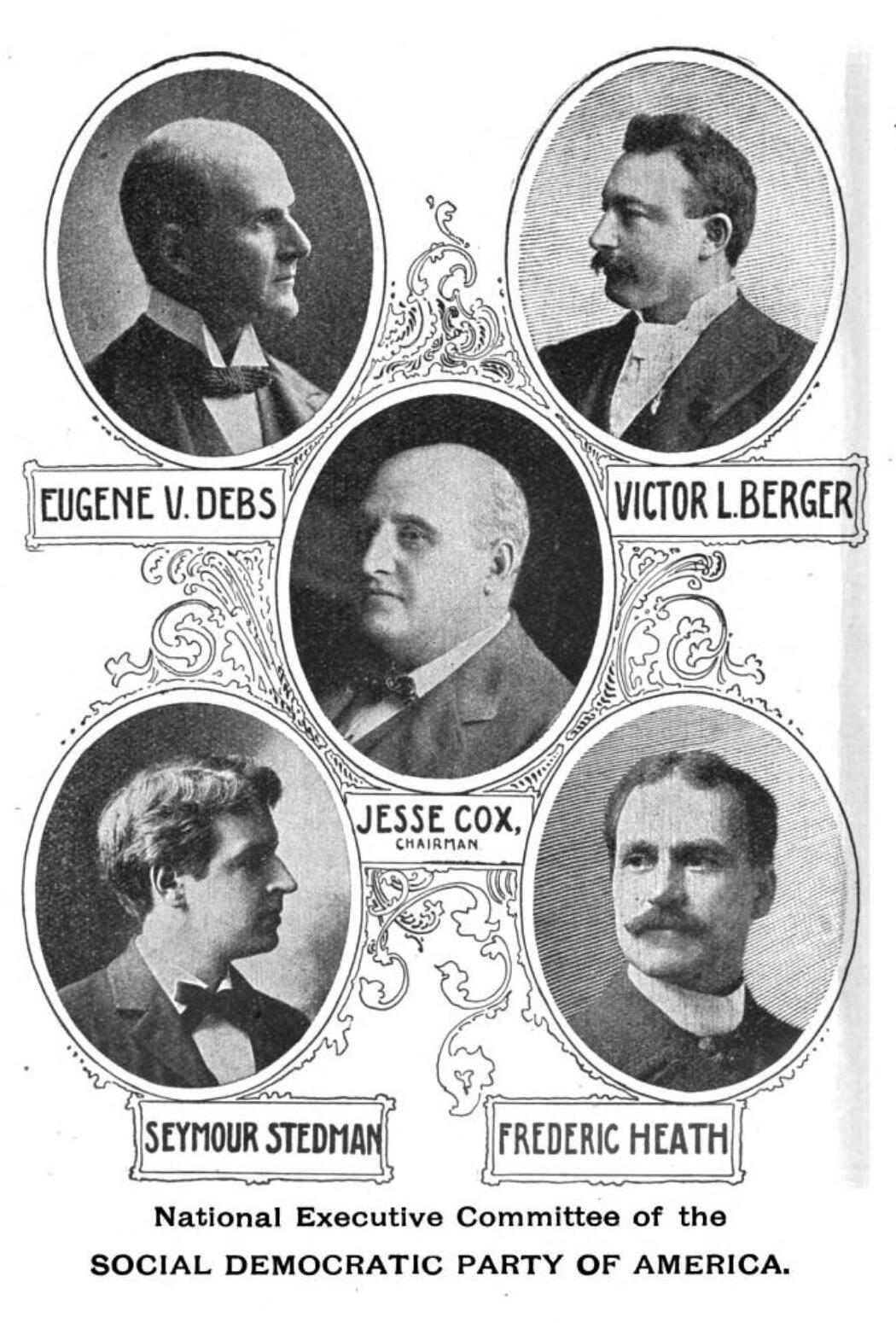
Members of the National Executive Committee of the SDP, 1900

The convention which gave birth to the new organization actually began as a final conclave of the ARU, which opened Tuesday morning June 15, 1897, in Handel Hall, Chicago. Director William E. Burns called the meeting to order and A.B. Adair of the Typographical Union presided. President of the ARU Eugene V. Debs delivered an address to the assembled delegates. The first three days of the convention were occupied with hearing reports of officers and of committees and closing up the affairs of the ARU.

On Friday, June 18, the organization formally changed its name to the Social Democracy of America and adopted a Declaration of Principles. The convention was then thrown open to delegates representing other organizations. Those represented included the Socialist Labor Party, the Socialist Trade and Labor Alliance, the Scandinavian Cooperative League, the Metal Polishers and Buffers' Union, the United Brotherhood of Carpenters and Joiners, the Chicago Labor Union Exchange and an assortment of other organizations.

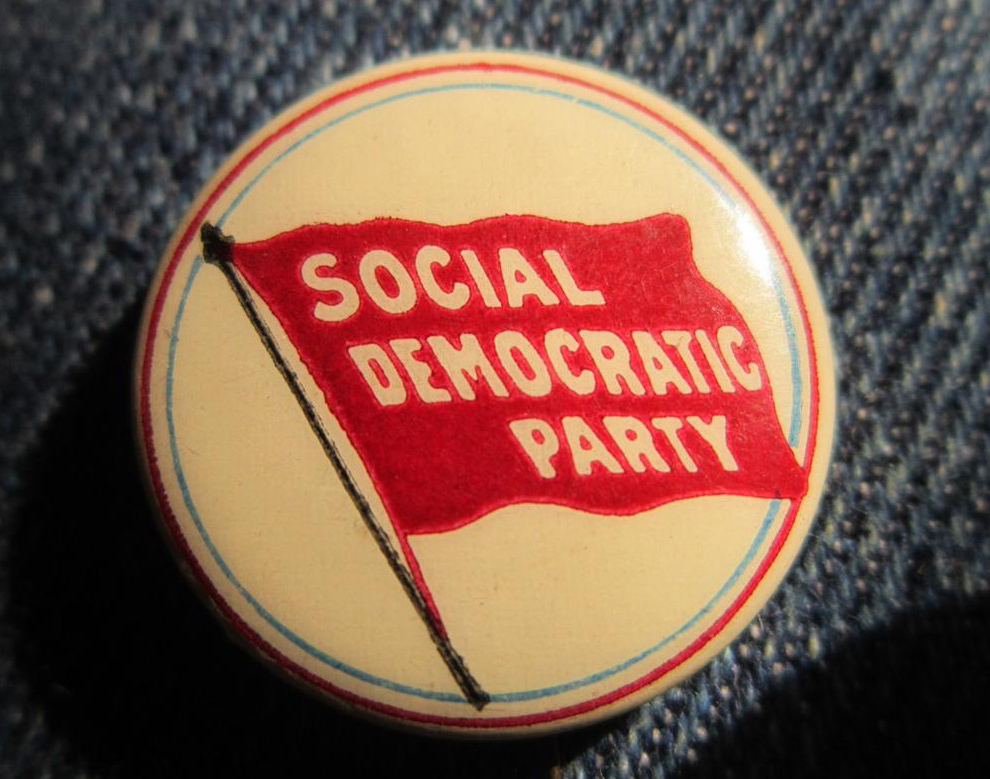
Pinback button issued by the Social Democratic Party of America c. 1900

The Social Democracy of America initially did not have an official head—its executive powers were vested in an executive board, with a chairman (Eugene V. Debs) merely presiding over the activities of that body. The unit of organization of the Social Democracy was the local branch of at least five members. On the first Tuesday in April, each of these local branches was to elect a single representative to the state union, the state-level governing body. On the first Tuesday in May, all the state unions were to assemble and elect one representative each to the National Council, which was in turn to meet on the first Tuesday in May and elect a five-member Executive Board, which was to hold office for a term of one year. An initiation fee of 25 cents was set and monthly dues pegged at 15 cents per month. Office of the organization was established at 504 Trude Building, Corner of Randolph and Wabash Aves., Chicago.

The Social Democracy of America proved to be a short lived and disparate group of Marxists, trade unionists (especially veterans of the ARU), Owenite socialists, populists and unaffiliated radicals. The party initially sought to establish socialist cooperative colonies. In August 1897, a three-member Colonization Committee was established, consisting of Col. Richard J. Hinton (Washington, D.C.), Wilfred P. Borland (Bay City, Michigan) and Cyrus Field Willard (Chicago). This trio explored the possibility of establishing a colony to seed the future Cooperative Commonwealth in the Cumberland plateau of Tennessee. As an associated side-project seems to have made a concrete proposal to the city of Nashville to construct 75 miles of railroad for the city—a project which would put to work the blacklisted and unemployed former members of the ARU and Social Democracy and help to build the notion of social ownership of productive capital in a single moment, it was hoped.

Cover motif of the paperback edition of Frederic Heath's Social Democracy Red Book

In addition to the "colonizationists", who favored concentration of their efforts on building a model economic unit and gaining the achievement of socialism through the power of example there emerged a "political action wing", which sought to achieve socialism through political organization and use of the electoral process, starting with concentration on a single state.

The colonization scheme failed to materialize by the time of the second convention of the SDA, held in Chicago from June 7–11, 1898, and attended by some 70 delegates. Frederic Heath, the first historian of the movement, recounted the gathering in a 1900 book:

Chairman Debs presided. Outwardly the meeting presented the picture of a pleasing and harmonious gathering, creditable to the Socialist movement. Under the surface, however, there was a hostility that meant almost certain rupture. The presence of such well-known Anarchists as Mrs. Lucy Parsons, wife of one of the victims of the outrageous Haymarket trial, Emma Goldman, common-law wife of Berkman, who shot Manager Frick at the time of the Homestead strike, and others, all enlisted under the colonization wing, the members of which were now using the phrases of the Anarchists at sneering at political action, showed that a parting of the ways must come. It rapidly developed that the colonization forces had organized to get control of the convention and had even gone to the length of organizing local 'branches on paper' within three days before the convention, in order to increase its list of delegates and make its control a certainty. These branches had been organized by William Burns and the other members of the national board, with the exception of Messrs. Debs and Keliher.

In his speech to the convention delivered June 8, Debs outlined his ideas on the goal of the Social Democracy and the tactics which the organization had best follow:

The mission of Social Democracy is to awaken the producer to a consciousness that he is a Socialist and to give him courage by changing his conditions. I have not changed in regard to our procedure. Give me 10,000 men, aye, 1,000 in a western state, with access to the sources of production, and we will change the economic conditions and we will convince the people of that state, win their hearts and their intelligence. We will lay hold upon the reins of government, and plant the flag of Socialism on the state house.

The Colonization Committee delivered a lengthy report, detailing the proposed purchase of a Colorado gold mine and the establishment of a colony around that operation. This imaginative (or hallucinatory) plan fanned the sentiments of the party's political actionists (who called themselves the "antis"), who found themselves more anxious than ever to disentangle themselves from what they perceived as an unsavory stock-selling scheme. A caucus was held of the "anti" faction on the third evening of the convention at which the group determined to fight the colonization program without compromise.

During the fourth day of the proceedings on Friday, June 10, things turned increasingly bitter when James Hogan of Utah delivered a two-hour report as vice chairman of the national executive board and treasurer, during the course of which he directly attacked Secretary Sylvester Keliher (a political actionist), alleging incompetence or dishonesty. The day was absorbed by a bitter debate over the program of the organization, with the main object of division a minority report put forward by John F. Lloyd on behalf of the colonizationists (disparagingly called the "goldbrick" faction by the "antis"). The arguments went on all day Friday June 10, finishing at 2:30 am with a vote in which the colonization minority plank was carried by a vote of 53 to 37. The meeting was adjourned and many delegates straggled off to bed, the anti-colonization faction already having decided to depart the organization and to establish a political party of their own in the aftermath of defeat on the colonization issue. The "anti" faction gathered in Parlor A of the hotel across the street where most of them were staying and in hushed tones continued their discussion until 4 am.

June 11, 1898 marked the conclusion of the convention of the Social Democracy of America as well as the day that 33 delegates bolted to hold a meeting establishing themselves as the Social Democratic Party of America.

J.M. Moore, the pastor of the African Methodist Episcopal Church in West Pratt, Alabama, was the only publicly known black member of the SDP.

=== Chicago Social Democratic Party ===
The Chicago SDP made use of the same clasped-hands-over-a-globe logo that was later appropriated by the Socialist Party of America.

The political action wing of the Social Democracy bolted the final day of the June 1898 Convention of the Social Democracy of America and instead held their own gathering at Hull House on South Halsted Street in Chicago. Since the gathering was held by a bolting faction of a convention formally called by the Social Democracy of America, subsequent party histories do not regard this first organizational meeting as a formal Convention—although the party organ established at the same time, the Social Democratic Herald, did consider it as such.

The fledgling group issued its organizational platform in the form of a Statement of Principles on June 11, 1898. In this document, the group categorized socialism as "the collective ownership of the means of production for the common good and welfare" and called upon "the wage-workers and all those in sympathy with their historical mission to realize a higher civilization" to sever ties with existing conservative capitalist and reformist political parties and to instead work for "the establishment of a system of cooperative production and distribution".

The split of the Social Democracy in America into a colonization organization on the one hand and the electorally-oriented Social Democratic Party of America on the other demoralized many American socialists. According to founding member Frederic Heath, "the split ... disheartened many Socialists, so that the party grew very slowly. It was not until fully a year after [the split] that real headway began to be made, outside of a few party strongholds like Massachusetts, Milwaukee, and St. Louis".

A political-action faction led by Victor Berger left the party convention and founded the Social Democratic Party as an explicitly socialist alternative to the mainstream parties. Later that year, the Social Democratic Party managed early success when two members of the party were elected to the Massachusetts General Court.

The colonizationists had taken the Social Democracy of Americans periodical (Social Democrat) so the Social Democratic Party started a new national publication (Social Democratic Herald) during the negotiations for the unity of the Socialist Party of America, when it was decided that the party would not publish an official national publication so the newspaper was sold to the Milwaukee Social Democrats led by Victor Berger.

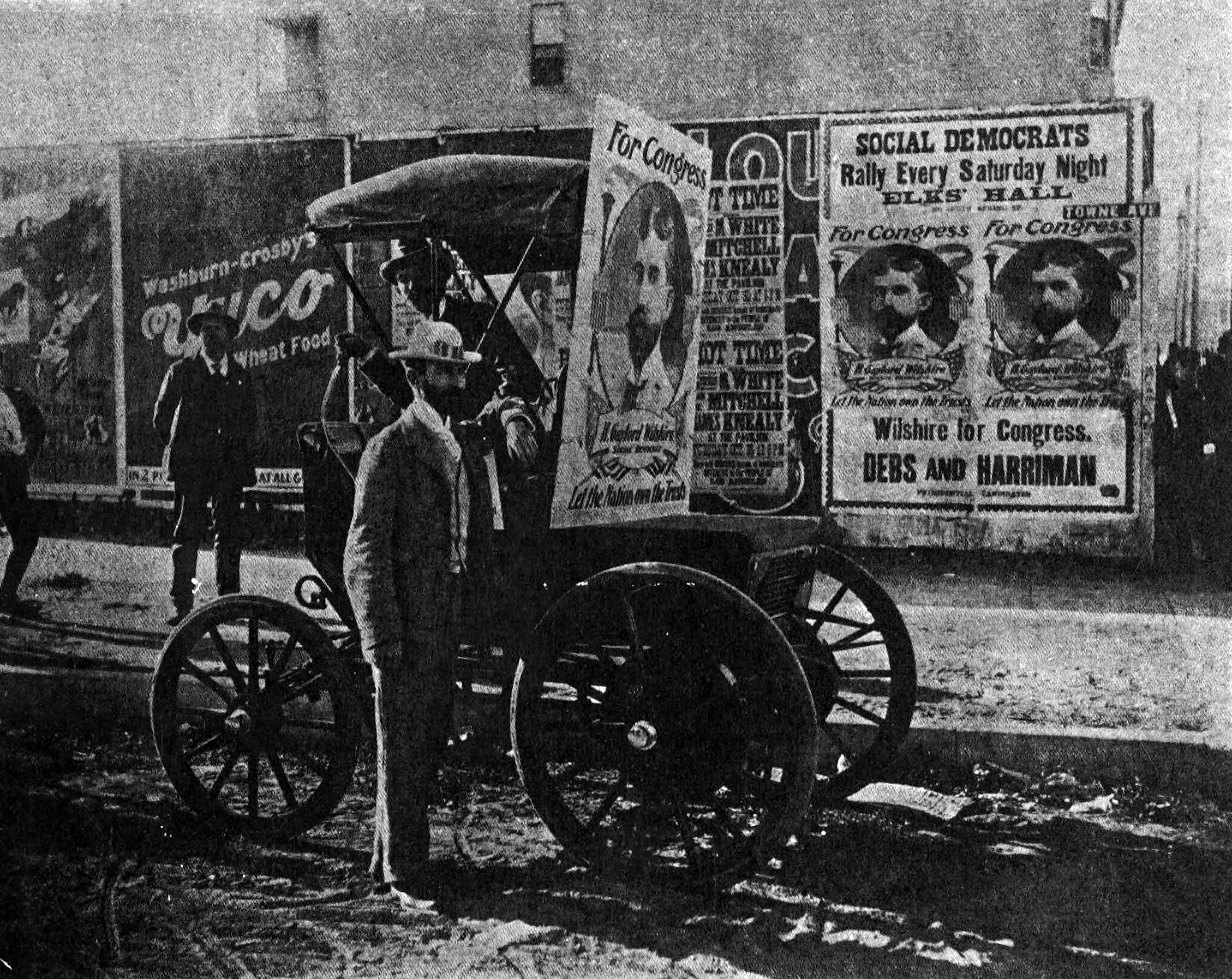
Gaylord Wilshire, Los Angeles publisher, during his 1900 congressional campaign on the Social Democratic ticket

Membership data on the organization is scarce. In his official report to the 1900 convention of the party, National Secretary-Treasurer Theodore Debs indicated that as of March 1, 1900, the dues-paying membership of the party was 4,536, participating in 226 active local branches. Of these, the younger Debs brother indicated that 985 members and 53 branches had been established during the previous 60 days, implying a significantly lower membership for the years 1898 and 1899. In the 1900 presidential election, Debs stood as the party's presidential candidate and received some 87,000 votes. This was considerably more than the established Socialist Labor Party.

=== Springfield Social Democratic Party ===
In addition to the Chicago-based Social Democratic Party of America mentioned above, there was a second Social Democratic Party of America based in Springfield, Massachusetts. In the second half of the 1890s, the Socialist Labor Party of America was showing signs of growth in size and influence. Divisions arose within the organization over the group's relationship to the American Federation of Labor and the party's internal regime.

The organization was deeply split between two hostile groups. On one side was a so-called "administration faction", represented by the party's national officials, such as Henry Kuhn, Henry Vogt and Lucien Sanial; and the editors and staffs of the official party publications, The People (English) and Vorwärts (German). This Regular faction included most prominently Daniel DeLeon, editor of The People and the single most influential individual inside the party. Against their continued reign stood an opposition faction, centered on the independently owned German-language socialist daily, the Newyorker Volkszeitung, the editor of which was Alexander Jonas.

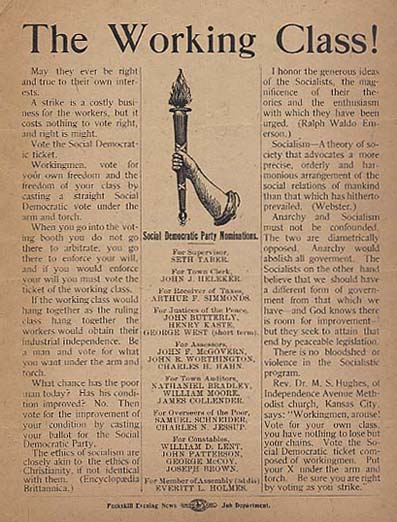
1900 leaflet of the Peekskill SDP which used an arm-and-torch logo reminiscent of the arm-and-hammer used by the Socialist Labor Party of America

The latter group was particularly hostile to the trade union policy adopted at the 1896 Convention, believing it to have alienated erstwhile allies in the existing labor movement and thus marginalized the party. It also resented the rigid party discipline practiced by the National Executive Committee, which included the expulsions of dissidents and the suspension of entire sections. This festering split erupted in open conflict in July 1899 over the election of a new General Committee (akin to a City Committee) of Section New York, a group to which the 1896 party convention purportedly delegated the power to elect the committee for the national organization. This new committee was to in turn have the power of selecting editors of the party's printed organs. Section New York, narrowly controlled by the dissident faction, elected such a General Committee, which met for the first time on July 8, 1899.

This gathering quickly dissolved in acrimony and a second meeting was hastily scheduled to be held two nights later by the dissident faction. This second session, elected Henry Slobodin as national secretary and named a new editor of The People, to replace DeLeon, to whom the dissidents felt personal enmity.

This action of the dissident general committee was not recognized by the sitting National Executive Committee, the meeting held to be illegally constitute and the committee and the official press continued to conduct their regular operations. The dissidents declared themselves the rightful owners of the Socialist Labor Party's name, logo and press and established themselves as such. Two parallel organizations, each designating itself the Socialist Labor Party and issuing a publication called The People, thus emerged in 1899, naming competing full slates of candidates for the elections of 1899. The matter was taken to the "capitalist" courts. The dissidents were derisively referred to in polemics as the "Kangaroos" by the Regulars—the analogy being drawn between the dissidents' free-and-loose interpretation of party legality in the calling and conduct of their reorganizational meetings and the "Kangaroo courts" of the wild west.

The dissident faction was bolstered by the support of allies in Chicago, centered on an English language newspaper called The Workers' Call, edited by A.M. Simons. This group initially attempted to circumvent the New York committee of the party by declaring itself the official center of the organization in light of the interparty emergency that erupted in the Summer of 1899 as a result of the rupture of Section New York. In response, Section Chicago was suspended by the New York committee. Dissident Section Chicago moved in fairly short order towards unity the largely German New York party right oppositionists.

An Emergency National Convention was called by the pro-AFL/anti-DeLeon "Kangaroo" dissidents. This gathering was held in Rochester, New York, attended by 59 delegates and proclaimed itself as the official 10th National Convention of the Socialist Labor Party. Henry L. Slobodin was formally elected executive secretary of the Rochester organization, which tentatively continued to call itself the Socialist Labor Party and to issue its own English language newspaper under the name of The People. The convention repudiated the Socialist Trade and Labor Alliance, the hated "dual union" umbrella organization established by the regular party in 1896 in opposition to the AFL, instead proclaiming its support for the struggles of all trade unions without regard to affiliation. A new platform was adopted and revised by-laws approved. The gathering also enacted a resolution calling for unity with the Social Democratic Party and named a Unity Committee, headed by Morris Hillquit, to attend the forthcoming convention of the party and to there make a unity appeal.

When the New York courts ruled decisively in favor of the claim of DeLeon, Kuhn and the Regulars in the matter of the ownership of the name logo and publication of the Socialist Labor Party against the claim of the dissidents, the Rochester group changed the name of their organization to Social Democratic Party of America, anticipating a rapid merger with Berger, Debs and the Midwestern organization of the same name. The Eastern group established party headquarters in Springfield, Massachusetts and became known as the Springfield SDP in distinction to the Chicago SDP.

According to the report of National Secretary William Butscher made to the July 1901 convention that established the Socialist Party of America, the Springfield SDP had a paid membership of 5,310 in the continental United States, with another 1,080 members in Puerto Rico, for a total of 6,390 as of January 1, 1901. A membership of 7,328 in 147 locals was reported by Butscher for the first six months of 1901, with another 82 locals failing to report.

== Notable members ==
- Leonard D. Abbott
- Joseph Barondess
- Victor L. Berger
- Barney Berlyn
- Ella Reeve Bloor
- William Butscher
- James F. Carey
- John C. Chase
- Jesse Cox
- Eugene V. Debs
- A. S. Edwards
- W. E. Farmer
- Margaret Haile
- Job Harriman
- Max S. Hayes
- Frederic Heath
- Isaac Hourwich
- G. A. Hoehn
- Anna Ingerman
- Philip Krantz
- Antoinette Konikow
- Algernon Lee
- Frederic O. MacCartney
- William D. Mahoney
- William Mailly
- Mary Harris Jones
- George A. Nelson
- Max Pine
- L. W. Rogers
- Louis M. Scates
- Henry Slobodin
- Seymour Stedman
- Hermon F. Titus
- Gaylord Wilshire
- Morris Winchevsky
- John M. Work

== Works cited ==
- Heath, Frederic (January 1900). "A Brief History of Socialism in America". Social Democracy Red Book. Terre Haute: Debs Publishing Co.
- Foner, Philip (1977). American Socialism and Black Americans: From The Age of Jackson to World War II. Greenwood Publishing Group. ISBN 0837195454.
