= Louis M. Scates =

American labor activist and politician

Louis M. Scates was one of the first socialists elected to a state legislature in the United States, winning election in 1899.

Louis M. Scates (c. 1863–1954) was an American labor activist and politician from Massachusetts. Scates, a shoeworker and street car operator, was a member of the Social Democratic Party of America when he was elected in 1899. He served a single term in the Massachusetts House of Representatives alongside fellow SDP member James F. Carey.

== Biography ==
Scates was defeated in his November 1899 bid for re-election by 317 votes when Democrats and Republicans fused their efforts behind the candidacy of Republican Carleton M. How.

After his electoral defeat, Scates would later serve on the staff of the radical Boot and Shoe Workers' Union.

Scates was expelled from the Socialist Party in 1907 for voting against continuation of the use of referendum ballots for the election of officials of the Boot & Shoe Workers’ Union, deemed a violation of socialist principles.

Louis M. Scates died in August 1954 at Haverhill, Massachusetts. He was 91 years old at the time of his death.

== See also ==
- James F. Carey
- Frederic O. MacCartney
