= Antoinette Konikow =

American physician and political activist

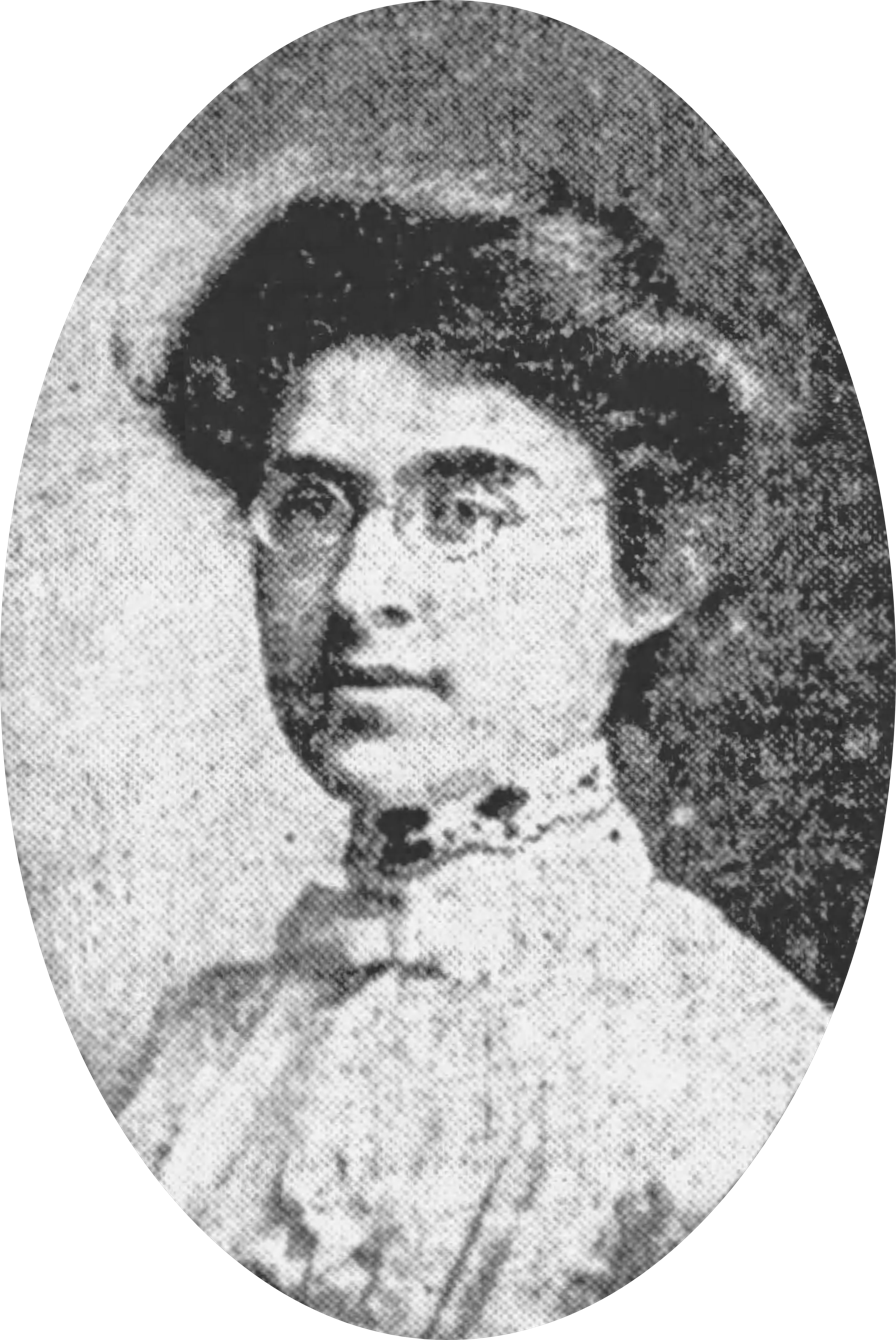
- Born: November 11, 1869; Orenburg, Orenburg Governorate, Russian Empire
- Died: July 2, 1946 (aged 76); Boston, Massachusetts, U.S.
- Notable work: Voluntary Motherhood
- Political party: Socialist Labor (1893–1897); Social Democracy (1897–1898); Social Democratic (1898–1901); Socialist (1901–1919); Communist (1919–1928); Communist League (1928–1934); Socialist Workers (1938–1946)
- Other political affiliations: Workers (1921–1928)
- Movement: Trotskyism, Birth control movement

Antoinette F. Buchholz Konikow (November 1869 – 2 July 1946) was an American physician, Marxist, and radical political activist. Konikow is best remembered as one of the pioneers of the American birth control movement and as a founding member of the Communist Party of America, forerunner of the Communist Party, USA. Expelled from the Communist Party as a supporter of Leon Trotsky in the fall of 1928, Konikow went on to become a founder of the Communist League of America, the main Trotskyist organization in the United States. Konikow's 1923 book, Voluntary Motherhood, is regarded as a seminal work in the history of 20th-century American feminism.

== Biography ==
=== Early years ===
Antoinette Federika Buchholz was born to Lutheran parents in 1869, in Orenburg in the Russian Empire. She was the daughter of Theodor Buchholz and Rosa Kuhner Buchholz. She had an older brother who was also a physician, Dr. Wilhelm Buchholz. She attended secondary school in Odessa in Ukraine before immigrating to Zurich, Switzerland to attend the university there. In 1891 in Zurich, she married a fellow student, Moses J. Konikow (Konikov), a Belarusian Jew from Vitebsk.

While in Switzerland, Konikow joined the Emancipation of Labor group headed by Georgii Plekhanov.

The Konikows subsequently came to America on 8 May 1893. Antoinette attended Tufts University, near Boston, from which she graduated with honors in 1902 with a medical degree. The couple had two children, Edith Rose Konikow (b. 1904) and William Morris Konikow (b. 1906) before divorcing in 1908.

She remained a practicing medical doctor in Boston up through the 1930s. As part of her work she organized lectures for women on birth control and suffered arrest for displaying contraceptives.

=== Political career ===
Antoinette Konikow was politically active from an early age, joining the Socialist Labor Party of America (SLP) in 1893 and writing and speaking on the organization's behalf. She was a delegate to the organization's 1896 National Convention at which it determined to establish the dual union to the American Federation of Labor, the Socialist Trade and Labor Alliance.

Konikow also worked closely with the Boston Workman's Circle (Yiddish: אַרבעטער־רינג, Arbeter Ring), a socialist Jewish social aid organization. In order to participate in the organization, Konikow learned Yiddish, one of five languages which she learned in her lifetime.

She left the SLP in 1897 over what she believed to be the narrow and dogmatic policies of the organization. Instead, Konikow cast her lot with the Social Democracy of America headed by Eugene V. Debs and Victor L. Berger, going so far as to sign a petition to the Massachusetts SLP convention inviting it to merge with the fledgling Chicago group. For her trouble the May 1898 Massachusetts State Convention of the SLP saw fit to formally expel Konikow from the organization.

Konikow followed Debs and Berger in an 1898 split which established the Social Democratic Party of America and in 1901 became a founding member the Socialist Party of America (SPA) when that organization was created through a merger of the Social Democratic Party and an Eastern organization by the same name composed of former SLP dissidents.

Konikow was a delegate to the SPA's 1908 National Convention, and was later instrumental in the establishment of several Socialist Sunday Schools, institutions designed to train working class children in socialist principles and ethics as an alternative to religious instruction.

When the Socialist Party split at its 1919 Emergency National Convention, Konikow cast her lot with the Communist Party of America (CPA), in which the radical foreign language federations of the old SP played a large role. Konikow participated as a delegate to the founding convention of the CPA in Chicago in September 1919.

Cover of Konikow's landmark 1923 birth control pamphlet, Voluntary Motherhood — signed "by a woman physician" for legal reasons.

Konikow was also active in the Communist Party's "aboveground" activities in this period, serving as chair of the New England Division of the National Defense Committee, a party organization dedicated to raising funds to pay for its legal defense needs.

Konikow was a delegate to the second convention of the Workers Party of America, successor to the underground Communist Party of America, held in New York City from December 24 to 26, 1922.

In 1924, Konikow stood as the Workers Party's candidate for U.S. Senate from Massachusetts.

Konikow was also deeply committed to the cause of birth control, a taboo topic in this era. She was a member of the Society of Sanitary and Moral Prophylaxis, one of the leading birth control organizations of the day. In the mid-1920s, she and her son-in-law, Joseph Vanzler (a.k.a. John G. Wright), jointly developed an inexpensive spermicidal jelly, the formula of which she shared with officials in the Soviet Union when she visited there as a birth control specialist in 1926.

While in the USSR, Konikow was won over to the political ideas of Leon Trotsky, then embroiled in a bitter factional dispute with the leadership of the Russian Communist Party headed by Joseph Stalin and Nikolai Bukharin. From 1927, Konikow was open in her support with the program of the United Opposition of Trotsky with Grigorii Zinoviev and Lev Kamenev in the USSR. This did not lead to her immediate removal from the party, however, only to the loss of her position as an instructor in the local party training school.

Konikow was expelled from the Communist Party headed by Executive Secretary Jay Lovestone in November 1928 as a Trotskyist. Upon her expulsion, she formed a tiny group in Boston calling itself the Independent Communist League. This group later merged with the Communist League of America headed by James P. Cannon, Martin Abern, and Max Shachtman at the time of its formation later that same year. She remained active in the Trotskyist movement until her death, contributing frequently to the party press on women's issues.

At the convention establishing the Socialist Workers Party in January 1938, Konikow was named an honorary member of its governing National Committee.

=== Death and legacy ===
Antoinette Konikow died of a heart attack in Boston in July 1946.

Konikow's 1923 book, Voluntary Motherhood, is regarded as a seminal work in the history of 20th century American feminism.

== Works ==
- Voluntary Motherhood: A Study of the Physiology and Hygiene of Prevention of Conception. Boston: Buchholz Publishing Co., 1923. Revised: 2nd edition 1926, 3rd edition 1928, 4th edition 1933, and 5th edition 1938. This link gives access to 4 of the five revisions of this pamphlet and to her main Marxists Internet Archive page.
- Physicians' Manual of Birth Control. New York: Buchholz Publishing Co., 1931.
