= George H. Simmons =

American physician

George Henry Simmons (January 2, 1852 – September 1, 1937) was an English-born American physician, editor-in-chief of the Journal of the American Medical Association (JAMA) and general secretary of the American Medical Association (AMA). He edited JAMA from 1899 to 1924.

== Biography ==
Simmons, it was claimed by his colleague, Dr. Harvey Cushing in 1924, was born in Moreton-in-Marsh, then moved to Lincoln, Nebraska, when he was 18. After studying at the University of Nebraska, Simmons graduated from Hahnemann Medical College. Hahnemann was a homeopathic program at the time. Simmons later rejected homeopathy. He subsequently graduated from Rush Medical College. He was secretary of the state medical society in Nebraska in the late 1890s.

Practicing medicine in Lincoln until 1899, Simmons came to Chicago when he was elected editor-in-chief of JAMA that year. The Chicago Tribune reported that several respected physicians – including Chicago physician Bayard Holmes – had been considered candidates for the position, but many of them were unwilling to work for the journal on a full-time basis. During Simmons' 25-year term as editor-in-chief and general secretary, the number of JAMA subscribers increased from 1,000 to 80,000.

Simmons supported the creation of AMA specialty journals, including the Archives of Dermatology and Syphilology (now JAMA Dermatology) and the American Journal of Diseases of Children (now JAMA Pediatrics). He also created a special council to review drug advertising in JAMA. The council rejected advertisements when it felt like the benefits of a product had not been adequately proven. The AMA underwent reorganization during Simmons' tenure, and he took on the dual role of JAMA editor and AMA general secretary.

Dermatologist William A. Pusey recalled Simmons as "the leading spirit" of the AMA. Pusey commented on Simmons' unique personality, writing, "He was a noble character... a man whom his intimates learned to love. He was not gruff or irritable, but he was not easy to know. He did not carry his feelings on his sleeve, but he had deep affection and admiration."

Simmons remained the AMA general secretary until 1911, and he retained significant influence within the AMA after that. He served as editor of JAMA until 1924, when he tendered his resignation and was appointed editor and general manager emeritus by the journal's trustees. Upon his retirement, a banquet was held in his honor, and the speakers included William James Mayo and Harvey Cushing. Morris Fishbein, who was Simmons' editorial assistant at JAMA, became his successor.

Media offices
Preceded by Truman W. Miller	Editor-in-chief of JAMA; 1899–1924	Succeeded by Morris Fishbein
