= Consumer health laws =

Consumer Health Laws are laws that ensure that health products are safe and effective and that health professionals are competent; that government agencies enforce the laws and keep the public informed; professional, voluntary, and business organizations that serve as consumer advocates, monitor government agencies that issue safety regulations, and provide trustworthy information about health products and services; education of the consumer to permit freedom of choice based on an understanding of scientific data rather than misleading information; action by individuals to register complaints when they have been deceived, misled, overcharged, or victimized by frauds.

== United States ==
- Pure Food and Drug Act (1906) – Also known as the Wiley Act, It was passed in response to public concern about food and drug safety. Administered by the Bureau of Chemistry, it required that food be pure and wholesome and drug ingredients to be listed and prohibited interstate commerce in food, drinks, and drugs that did not meet these requirements.
- Sherley Amendment to the Food and Drug Act (1912) – Enacted to overcome the ruling in the 1911 United States v. Johnson, where the Supreme Court prohibited labeling medicines with false therapeutic claims intended to defraud the purchaser.
- Federal Food, Drug, and Cosmetic Act (1938) – Replaced the 1906 Pure Food and Drugs Act with new and stronger provisions including:
  - Extending control to cosmetics and therapeutic devices.
  - Requiring new drugs to be shown safe before marketing-starting a new system of drug regulation.
  - Eliminating the Sherley Amendment requirement to prove intent to defraud in drug misbranding cases.
  - Providing that safe tolerances be set for unavoidable poisonous substances.
  - Authorizing standards of identity, quality, and fill-of-container for foods.
  - Authorizing factory inspections.
  - Adding the remedy of court injunctions to the previous penalties of seizures and prosecutions.
- Public Health Service Act (1944) – Safety, purity, and potency of biologic products such as vaccines, sera, and blood for interstate sale. Safety of pasteurized milk and shellfish, along with the sanitation of food, water, food services, and facilities on trains, airplanes, and buses.
- Durham-Humphrey Amendment (1951) – Drugs cannot be safely used without medical supervision,
  - Must be labeled and dispensed only by prescription of a licensed health practitioner,
  - The distinction between over-the-counter and prescription drugs was made.
- Food Additives Amendment (1958) – Prohibited used of food additives until the manufacturer established their safety. The Delaney proviso prohibits the approval of any food additives shown to induce cancer in humans or animals.
- Color Additive Amendments (1960) – FDA regulation for the safe use of color additives in foods, drugs, and cosmetics. Required manufacturers to make necessary scientific investigations to establish safety. The Delaney proviso prohibits the approval of any color additive shown to induce cancer in humans or animals.
- Federal Hazardous Substances Labeling Act (1960) – Required labels to display warnings regarding household products with hazardous chemicals.
- Kefauver-Harris Drug Amendment (1962) – Was passed to ensure drug efficacy and greater drug safety. Drug manufacturers are required to prove to the FDA the effectiveness of their products before marketing them.
- Drug Abuse Control Amendments (1965) – Control the manufacture and distribution of depressants, stimulants, and hallucinogens. Required wholesalers and jobbers of these drugs to register annually with the FDA. Gave FDA authorization to seize illegal supplies, serve warrants, arrest violators, and require all legal handlers of controlled drugs to keep records of their supplies and sales.
- Fair Packaging and Labeling Act (1966) – Provided additional support for the FDA to ensure that food, drugs, medical devices, and cosmetics were honestly and informatively labeled.
- Radiation Control for Health and Safety Act (1968) – Protected the public from unnecessary exposure to radiation from electronic products such as televisions, microwaves, and x-ray machines.
- Poison Prevention Act (1970) – Required special packaging to protect children from accidentally ingesting toxic substances.
- Medical Device Amendments (1976) – Supplemented the FD&C Act of 1938. Permitted action only if a defect in a product was discovered after the product was in use.
- Proxmire Amendment (1976) – Prohibited the FDA from limiting the potency of ingredients of vitamin and mineral products that are not inherently dangerous.
- Infant Formula Act (1980) – Required strict controls to ensure the nutritional content and safety of commercial baby foods.
- Orphan Drug Act (1983) – Facilitated the development of new drugs for more than 5000 rare diseases affecting as many as 20 million Americans.
- Drug Price Competition and Patent Term Restoration Act (1984) – Allows the FDA to approve generic versions of previously approved new drugs without requiring their sponsors to duplicate the costly human tests required for the original drugs.
- Prescription Drug Marketing Act (1988) – Allows selling, buying, trading, or offering to sell, buy, or trade prescription drug samples.
- Safe Medical Devices Act (1990) – FDA power to Obtain earlier knowledge of serious device problems and order recalls to quickly remove defective products from the market.
- Nutrition Labeling and Education Act (1990) – Provided for:
  - Mandatory labeling on most food products,
  - Standardization of portion sizes,
  - More appropriate disclosure of fat and cholesterol contents,
  - Determination of whether disease-prevention claims can be made for various nutrients,
  - Voluntary guidelines to retailers for nutrition information of raw fruits, vegetables, and fish.
- Dietary Supplement Health and Education Act (DSHEA) (1994) – Broadened the term “dietary supplements” to include herbs and many other substances that lack nutritional value,
  - Shifted the burden of proof of safety of the FDA,
  - Set standards for the distribution of their-party literature,
  - Allows statements of “nutritional support” under certain circumstances,
  - Specified the ingredient and nutritional label information,
  - Required goods manufacturing practices,
  - Established the NIH Office of Dietary Supplements of oversee research and provide advice to other federal agencies.
- Food Quality Protection Act (1996) – Replaced the Delaney Clause with a more flexible requirement that additives be safe.
- Food and Drug Administration Modernization Act of 1997 (1997) – Extended regulations intended to:
  - Accelerate review of new drugs and devices. Increase patient access to experimental drugs and devices.
  - Permit pharmacists to compound certain categories of drug products not commercially available.
