= Joseph Vanzler =

Jewish-American socialist, activist and translator

- Born: 29 October 1901; Samarqand, Turkestan Krai, Russian Empire
- Died: 21 June 1956 (aged 54); New York City, New York, United States
- Alma mater: Harvard College
- Occupation: Translator
- Spouses: Edith Rose Konikow; Doris Vanzler
- Children: 2
- Relatives: Antoinette Konikow (mother-in-law)
- Writing career
- Pen name: John G. Wright
- Genre: Translation
- Subject: Works of Trotsky
- Movement: Trotskyism
- Political party: SWP
- Other political affiliations: CLA(O)

Joseph "Usick" Vanzler (November 29, 1901 – June 21, 1956), best known by the pseudonym John G. Wright, was a Jewish-American socialist, activist and translator. Vanzler is best known as the translator of a number of the important works of Leon Trotsky — materials which helped to establish to expand the influence of the Trotskyist movement in the English-speaking world.

== Biography ==
=== Early years ===
Joseph Vanzler, known to all who knew him by the nickname "Usick," was born in 1901 in Samarkand, then part of the Russian Empire and today part of Uzbekistan. An ethnic Jew, Joseph was the son of a glasscutter (who had his own shop at Dzhamskaya Str., 19).

Vanzler was permitted to attend Russian-language school, institutions which strictly limited Jewish enrollment as part of a policy of official antisemitism under the Tsarist regime. In school, Vanzler studied a variety of languages, including Russian, Latin, Greek, and French. He developed a proficiency for language study which served him throughout his life as a multi-lingual translator.

Following World War I, Vanzler and his mother emigrated to the United States, settling in Boston, Massachusetts. Vanzler attended Harvard University (then Harvard College), where he studied Chemistry for an extensive period. Although he left without a degree, Vanzler developed a formula for spermicidal jelly for use as a birth control measure and he became engaged in its manufacture and sale.

In the 1920s Vanzler married Edith Rose Konikow, the daughter of birth control activist Dr. Antoinette Konikow, a Boston physician and founding member of the Communist Party of America. Under the influence of his wife and mother-in-law, Vanzler was initiated into the world of radical politics.

=== Political career ===
Vanzler joined the Communist League of America, the main American Trotskyist political organization of the day, in 1933. He began using the pseudonym "John G. Wright" at this time and began to produce a vast array of translations from Russian and French to English on behalf of the political movement to which he gave his allegiance.

Vanzler was a founding member of the Socialist Workers Party in 1938. He was a member of its governing National Committee from 1938 until his death in 1956.

Vanzler was a prolific writer for the Trotskyist press, contributing several hundred articles to its weekly newspaper, The Militant, and to its monthly theoretical magazine, The New International (later Fourth International).

=== Death and legacy ===
Joseph Vanzler died of a heart attack on June 21, 1956, in New York City. He was 55 years old at the time of his death.

Vanzler was survived by his first wife, Edith Konikow Vanzler, and their son, Tyl, and by his second wife, Doris Vanzler, and their son who was born in 1952.

== Works ==
=== Writings ===
- The Truth About Kronstadt. New York: Socialist Workers Party National Educational Department, n.d. [c. 1938].
- Outline History of Russian Bolshevism. With Joe Hansen. New York: Educational Department, Socialist Workers Party, 1940.

=== Translations ===
- Leon Trotsky, The Kirov Assassination. New York: Pioneer Publishers, 1935.
- Leon Trotsky, The Third International After Lenin. New York: Pioneer Publishers, 1936.
- Leon Trotsky, Whither France? New York: Pioneer Publishers, 1936.
- Leon Trotsky, Lessons of October. New York: Pioneer Publishers, 1937.
- Leon Trotsky, The Stalin School of Falsification. New York: Pioneer Publishers, 1937.
- Leon Trotsky, The First Five Years of the Communist International. In two volumes. New York: Pioneer Publishers, 1945.
