= Gaylord Wilshire =

American land developer, publisher, and socialist (1861–1927)

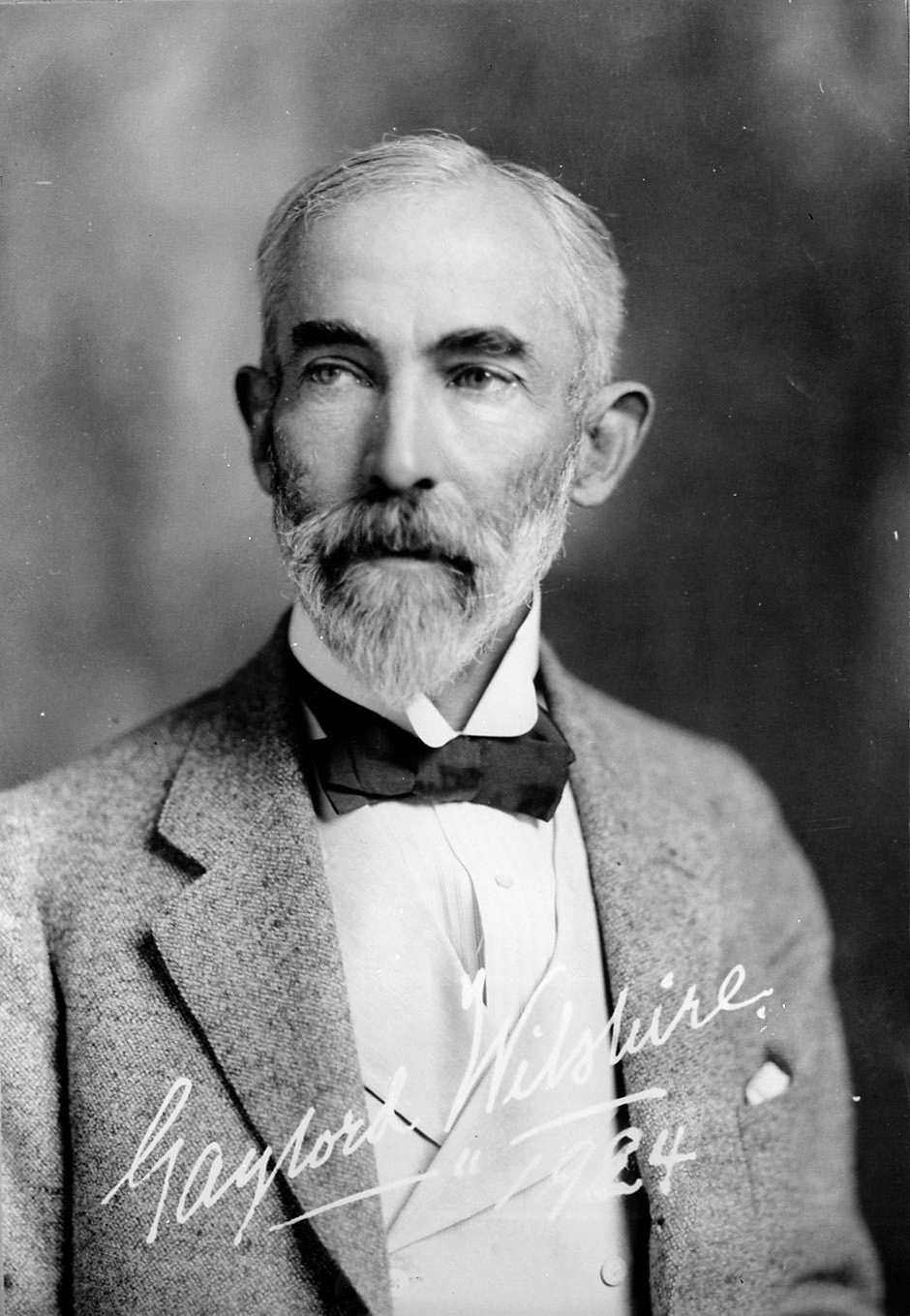
Wilshire in 1924

Henry Gaylord Wilshire (June 7, 1861 – September 7, 1927), known to his contemporaries by his middle name of "Gaylord", was an American land developer, publisher, and outspoken socialist. He ran at various times as a candidate for several leftist parties, albeit never elected. He is the namesake of Los Angeles' Wilshire Boulevard and an early resident of the city of Fullerton in Orange County.

== Biography ==
Wilshire c. 1901

Henry Gaylord Wilshire was born June 7, 1861, in Cincinnati, Ohio. He moved to Los Angeles, California in 1884.

Wilshire turned to populist politics in the early 1890s, writing from London in the fall of 1892 to the Anaheim Journal to advocate the nationalization of America's railways as a means of reining in the "chief grabbers" Jay Gould and Cornelius Vanderbilt.

He was author of the 1890 book Why workingmen should be social democrats, The Problem of the Trust (1900), and Socialism Inevitable (1907).

In 1895 he began developing 35 acres (140,000 m^{2}) stretching westward from Westlake Park for an elite residential subdivision. He donated a strip of land to the city of Los Angeles for a boulevard through what was then a barley field, on the conditions that it would be named for him and that railroad lines and commercial or industrial trucking would be banned.

In 1890, he stood as the Nationalist Party candidate for Congress in California's 6th congressional district in the Fullerton area. He was the first congressional candidate in the U.S. for what was a socialist party. He received more than a thousand votes but was not elected.

He ran as the Socialist Labor Party candidate for Attorney General in 1891 and was nominated to run for the British Parliament in 1894 (but had to return to the U.S. prior to the election).

Beside his political work, Wilshire also involved himself in the search for cheap energy. He was the author of the 1899 book Liquid air - perpetual motion at last - Tripler's surplusage explained, in which he explained a way to use the heat of sunlight to pressurize water and create heat and horsepower.

In 1900, Wilshire launched the first of his publishing ventures in Los Angeles, a magazine called The Challenge. At least 40 issues of the publication were produced between December 1900 and October 1901. The name of this publication was subsequently changed to Wilshire's Monthly Magazine in 1901, before being shortened to Wilshire's Magazine (1902) and Wilshire's (1904), with publication variously in New York and Toronto. (He lived in Toronto circa 1902.)

First a small-format magazine, later a tabloid newspaper, Wilshire's continued in production until February 1915.

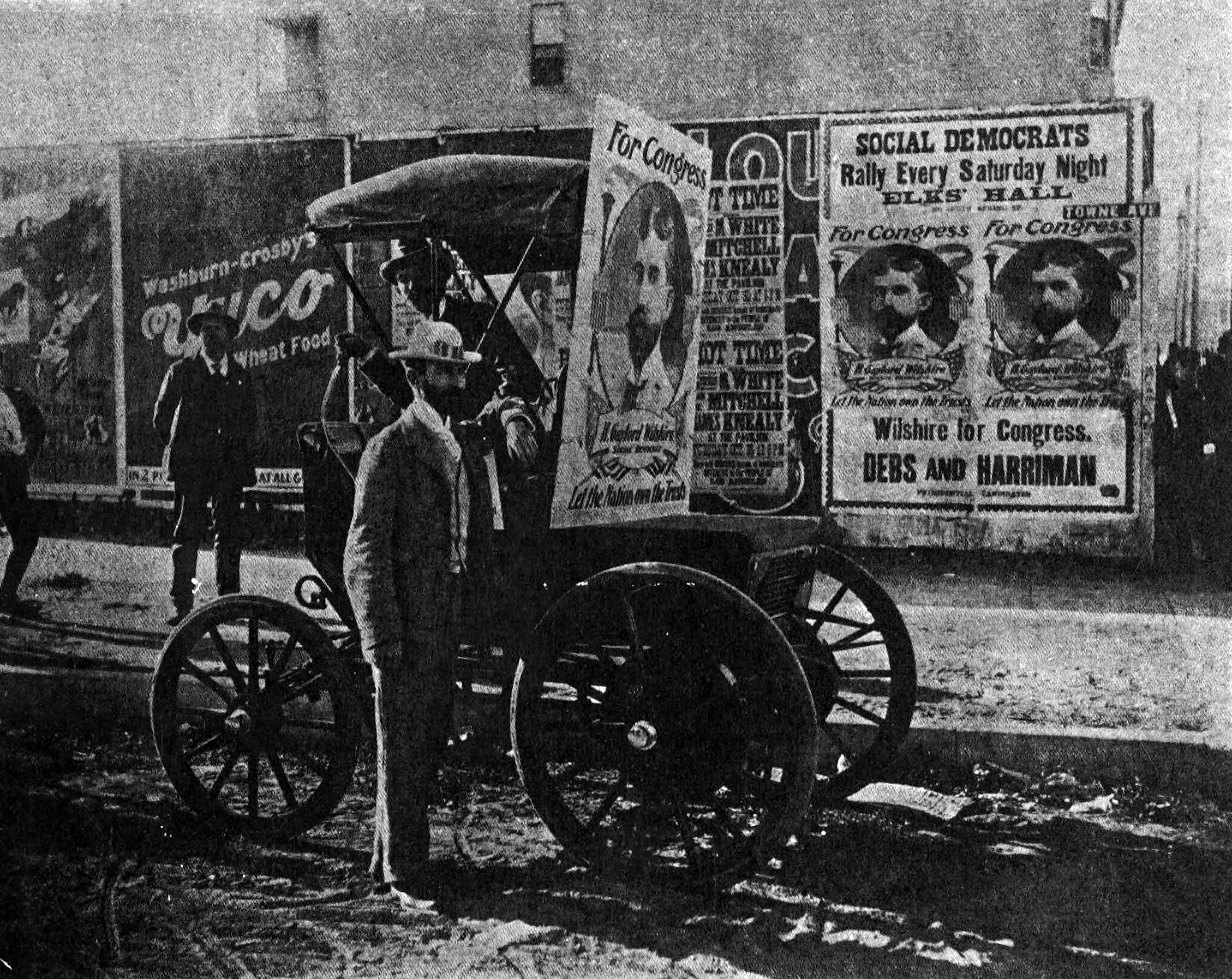
Wilshire during his 1900 congressional campaign

He ran for Congress in California's 6th district again in 1900, this time on the ticket of the Social Democratic Party of America. That year he was author of The Problem of the Trust (1900).

In 1900, Wilshire was arrested for speaking in a public park in Los Angeles. A judge dismissed the charges, but the incident caused Wilshire to leave Los Angeles for New York.

When his magazine was banned in the U.S., he moved to Canada and mailed his newspaper into the U.S. from that outside location. He is said to have run for the Canadian Parliament in 1902.

He moved to New York City and ran to be a New York Congressman in 1904. In 1909 he was president of the Beaver National Bank of New York City.

== Later life ==
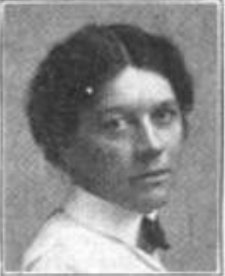
Wilshire's wife Mary c. 1909

Wilshire eventually returned to Los Angeles and made his connection with the now famous boulevard that bore his name. He had no direct involvement with its gradual expansion in the years while he was absent from the region.

In 1909 Wilshire was a candidate for the Los Angeles city council as a member of the Socialist Party slate. The Socialist Party was backed at that time by Los Angeles unions.

Wilshire and Dr. John R. Haynes fought for Direct Legislation to be included in L.A.'s new city charter. With their success, the way was open to address the corruption that had been rampant.

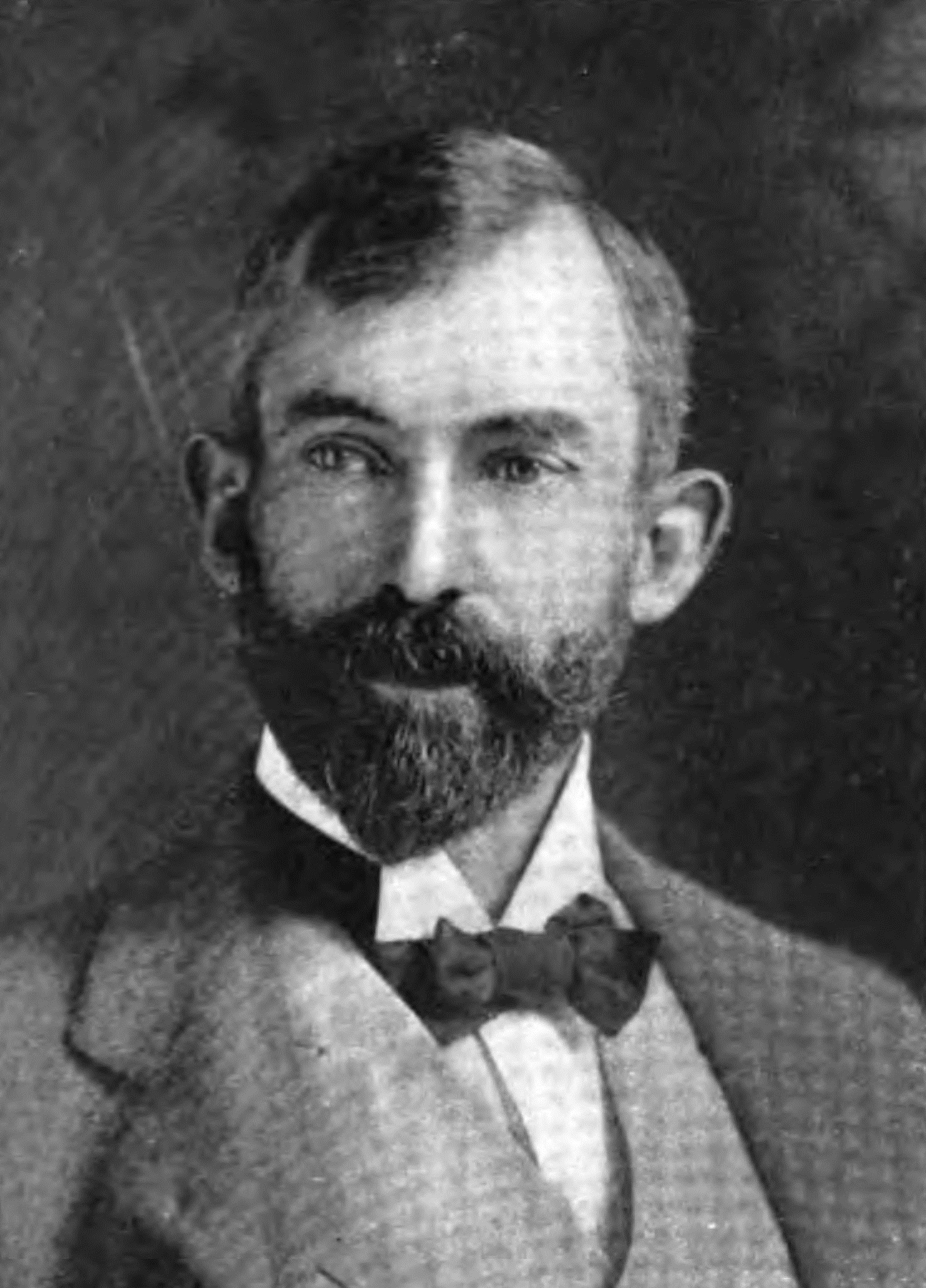
Wilshire c. 1907

By about 1911 Wilshire expressed doubts about electoral politics, and in his writing, shifted to revolutionary syndicalism and advocacy of the general strike. He was author of Syndicalism: What It Is (1912). He was also the editor of the Syndicalist League's magazine The Syndicalist in April and May 1912 when the editor, Guy Bowman, was imprisoned, and was editor again in 1913.

During World War I Wilshire worked with Emma Goldman in the Free Speech League in New York. He was author of the 1918 book Autocracy vs. democracy: Both failures.

Wilshire was also interested in the health industry. In 1925, he started marketing the Ionaco, an electric belt that could purportedly improve health. The belt gained popularity from its marketing, but was dismissed by medical health experts as quackery.

== Death and legacy ==
Gaylord Wilshire died destitute on September 7, 1927 in New York.

Wilshire Drive in Phoenix, Arizona, was named after him, as is Wilshire Avenue in Fullerton, California (where he first ran for Congress in 1890, the first congressional candidate in America from what became a socialist-oriented party).

== See also ==
- Wilshire Boulevard

== Works ==
=== Books and pamphlets ===
- Why American Workingmen Should Be Socialists. 1891. —Four page leaflet.
- Free Trade vs. Protection. New York: Socialist League of America, 1892.
- The Poor Farmer and Why He is Poor. Fullerton, CA: Nationalist Publication Co., n.d. [c. 1899].
- Liquid Air: Perpetual Motion at Last: Tripler's Surplusage Explained. Los Angeles, n.p., 1899.
- The Problem of the Trust. Los Angeles: [Gaylord Wilshire], 1900.
- The Trust Problem. Los Angeles: Social Democratic Party, 1900.
- Imperialism. Los Angeles: Los Angeles Branch of the Social Democratic Party, 1900.
- A Business-like City Charter. Los Angeles: Allied Printing, 1900.
- Trusts and Imperialism. Chicago: Charles H. Kerr & Co., 1901.
- Imperative Mandate, Initiative and Referendum: Adopted in the Late Proposed New Charter for Los Angeles. Los Angeles: Gaylord Wilshire, 1901.
- Debate on Socialism, Wilshire-Seligman: A Verbatim Report of the Greatest Debate in the History of Socialism in the United States, Which Took Place in Cooper Union, January 16, 1903, New York City. With E.R.A. Seligman. New York: Wilshire's Magazine, 1903.
- Ten Cents a Year. New York: Wilshire Book Co., 1905.
- Wilshire-Carver Debate on Socialism: Gaylord Wilshire vs. Thomas Nixon Carver: Held January 15, 1906, at Hartford, Conn. Before the "Get Together Club." New York: Wilshire Book Co., 1906.
- Socialism: A Religion. New York: Wilshire Book Co., 1906.
- Wilshire Editorials. New York: Wilshire Book Co., 1906.
- Socialism Inevitable (Wilshire Editorials). New York: Wilshire Book Co., 1907.
- Socialism: The Mallock-Wilshire Argument. New York: Wilshire Book Co., n.d. [c. 1907].
- The Significance of the Trusts. New York : Wilshire Book Co., n.d. [c. 1900s].
- Hop Lee and the Pelican. New York : Wilshire Book Co., n.d. [c. 1900s].
- Why a Workingman Should Be a Socialist. Chicago: Charles H. Kerr & Co., n.d. [c. 1912].
- Syndicalism: What It Is. London: 20th Century Press, 1912.
- I-ON-A-CO: The Short Road to Health. Los Angeles: [Gaylord Wilshire], n.d. [c. 1926].

=== Magazines ===
- Wilshire's Magazine Archive at marxists.org. Retrieved April 21, 2026.
