= French religious protectorate in China =

1840s-1920s French-asserted Catholic protectorate

From approximately the 1840s through the 1920s (historical framings vary), France asserted a religious protectorate over the Catholic Church in China. It used the privileges it had extracted from the Qing dynasty in the unequal treaties following the Opium Wars to obtain privileges and benefits for Catholic missionaries operating in China. With these privileges, France established a role in providing Catholic missionaries with access to China's interior, providing French extraterritoriality over missionaries, and providing a mechanism through which foreign missionaries could seek French judicial intervention on behalf of Chinese Catholics, to the exclusion of Chinese legal authorities. France used its religious protectorate as a means to assert its diplomatic interests and standing.

France's religious protectorate in China also created tensions with the Holy See. France blocked attempts by several Popes to establish bilateral relations with China. In 1919, Pope Pius XI issued the encyclical Maximum Illud which supported the increased localisation of the Catholic Church in China. Some missionary societies ignored the encyclical and in 1922, Pius XI sent Celso Benigno Luigi Costantini to China as an apostolic delegate to implement it. One historical view deems Constantini's arrival in China as the end of the French religious protectorate.

== Background ==
=== Patronage and the Propaganda Fide ===
Beginning in the 1450s, Catholic missions were administered through patronage rights (jus patronatus). Following the Treaty of Tordesillas in 1494, Pope Julius II granted Asia to Portugal's patronage (padroado). Portugal therefore obtained administrative authority over Catholic missions in China, including (1) the ability to appoint bishops and missionaries and build churches and (2) the responsibility to fund and protect missions. Portugal became engaged in a series of geopolitical struggles, including its incorporation into the Hapsburg Spain and its wars. Portugal was unable to effectively implement its patronage in east Asia.

As a result, in 1622, Pope Gregory XV founded the Sacred Congregation for the Propagation of the Faith (Propaganda Fide). The Propaganda Fide asserted the law of commissions (jus commisionis). The Propaganda Fide thus had the right to appoint apostolic vicars to function as the bishops of dioceses not yet established. Because of the simultaneous existence of the Propaganda Fide's rights and the patronage system, parts of China had church officials appointed under each power structure. European countries competed for Catholic influence in China and the religion did not expand far into China. During the late Ming and early Qing periods, Chinese Catholics began developing their own institutions without major foreign interference.

=== The Opium Wars and Unequal Treaties ===
Following the British Empire's defeat of China in the First Opium War (1839–1841), China was required to permit foreign missionaries. The unequal treaties gave European powers jurisdiction over missions and some authority over Chinese Christians. France required China to sign the Treaty of Huangpu in 1844. The foreign extraterritoriality created through the unequal treaties expanded throughout the 1840s and 1850s and allowed for the increased penetration of missionaries into China.

== History ==
France asserted itself as the protector of the Catholic Church in China from the 1840s to 1920s (an alternative view dates it until the 1940s). It sought to fill Portugal's largely defunct patronage role. Lacking significant commercial ties to China, France focused on its religious role as a major aspect of its diplomacy with China. The protectorate provided a mechanism for France to expand its influence in China and gain prestige relative to the other European powers. France also obtained intelligence benefits, as missionaries were expected to relay useful information to French authorities. France became a secular state in 1905 but continued to use French missionaries as agents of its empire.

=== Establishment ===
The French protectorate in China began as a foreign policy goal of the French civil government through its foreign minister to China in the 1840s, Marie Melchior Joseph Théodose de Lagrené. A Catholic, de Lagrené viewed the negotiation of the Treaty of Huangpu as an opportunity to improve the prestige of France and the Catholic Church through religious policy. He asked his Qing government counterpart, Qiying, to persuade the Daoguang Emperor to provide religious toleration for Catholics as a demonstration of goodwill for France. Hoping that doing so would create division between the French imperialists and the Protestant British imperialists, the Daoguang Emperor agreed.

The Treaty of Huangpu institutionalised benefits for French Catholics, including the ability to operate and establish religious institutions in the treaty ports, decriminalisation of Catholicism throughout China, and providing that any missionaries discovered by Chinese authorities outside the treaty ports should be escorted to a French consulate. De Lagrené negotiated an edict the Daoguang Emperor issued in 1846 which reaffirmed the free exercise of Catholic religious practice, mandated punishment for Chinese officials who persecuted Catholics, and restored to local Catholics all church property seized since the Kangxi Emperor's ban on Christianity in the early 18th century. The result in the subsequent decades was that magistrates dealing with Catholics in China were required to negotiate with French officials and address both domestic law and treaty law.

France obtained further privileges through the Sino-French Beijing Convention of 1860, which followed the Qing government's loss in the Second Opium War. Christian missionaries had the ability to travel anywhere in China's interior and buy property in China's interior.

=== Functions ===
The French religious protectorate in China operated through two key functions: (1) it gave foreign missionaries access to China's interior, and (2) it defended Catholics in Chinese court proceedings.

Missionaries entering China's interior needed passports, and because France had the most extensive of the relevant treaty rights, its passports were particularly sought after. Non-French missionaries obtained these passports as notre compatriote, and France sought to monopolise this control over the travel of Catholic missionaries in China. After a rival attempt by Italy to increase its passport authority, France responded by granting French citizenship to all missionaries carrying the French-issued passports.

Over time, the religious protectorate's primary function developed into handling court cases and legal disputes on behalf of Catholics in China. If a passport-holding missionary became involved in a legal conflict in China's interior, they could not be held accountable by Chinese magistrates, but rather had to be brought to the closest French civil official. Chinese Catholics could not directly seek intervention from French civil officials, but could bring their issues to missionaries who could then seek French intervention on their behalf. French officials would extract indemnities from the Qing government for losses incurred by missionaries and Chinese Catholics during local conflicts and rebellions.

The ability to intervene in court cases made the Catholic Church a new source of power in local Chinese society. It obtained support from people living at the margins of Chinese society and groups seeking allies in local conflicts. Chinese who converted to Catholicism to obtain protection were sometimes called rice Christians, litigation Christians, or feud Christians.

As a result of the religious protectorate, it became typical for Catholic churches and missions in China to fly the French flag.

=== Diplomatic tensions with the Holy-See ===
By framing itself as the protector of Catholics in China, France created a sustained diplomatic dispute with the Holy See about who had authority over Chinese Catholics. France blocked attempts by Leo XIII to establish bilateral relations between the Holy See and China, threatening the Holy See that it would withdraw its own ambassador to the Holy See and apply punitive measures against the Catholic Church in France. According to Leo XIII, the failure to establish relations with China was "the greatest sorrow of [his] pontificate." France also blocked attempts by Pius X and Benedict XV, contending that the Holy See had no sovereign territory and no right to independent action in international affairs.

In 1917–1918, France blocked another of the Holy See's efforts to establish diplomatic relations with the Republic of China. Although China's Beiyang government and the Holy See had reached a tentative agreement, France gathered support from the other World War I allied powers to pressure China to abandon these efforts (contending that because the proposed apostolic nuncio was German, the effort was a Germany-Holy See plot). As a result of the French maneuvers, Vatican interests in China were represented by an Apostolic Delegate (which does not have formal diplomatic status) until the 1940s.

=== Ending of the French religious protectorate ===
Chinese Catholics sought the intervention of the Holy See, contending that the magisterium should settle disputes between Chinese Catholics and foreign Catholics in China.

Responding to complaints about foreign interference in China, Benedict XV issued the encyclical Maximum Illud (1919). The encyclical supported efforts to make the Catholic Church in China more indigenous and with a Chinese hierarchy, telling missionaries that they must not prioritize national origin over their religious mission. Some of the missionary societies operating in China ignored the encyclical.

In 1922, Pius XI sent Celso Benigno Luigi Costantini to China as an apostolic delegate tasked with implementing Maximum Illud. To avoid interference from European powers, the move was not announced until after Constantini had left for China. In China, Constantini sought to distinguish the Catholic Church from the civil Western powers, establishing the apostolic delegation's headquarters at a distance from the Western legations. According to one historical view, Constantini's arrival in China is viewed as the end of the French religious protectorate.

In 1926, the first six Chinese Bishops of modern times were consecrated in Rome. This marked a further decline in the Holy See's tacit permission for France to handle ecclesiastical matters in China.

Alternative historical framings date the end of the French religious protectorate with the Second Sino-Japanese War or the founding of the People's Republic of China.

== See also ==
- History of religion in China
- Christianity in China
- History of foreign relations of China
- Foreign relations of the Holy See
- History of French foreign relations
- Western Imperialism in Asia
