= Louis Laneau =

Most Reverend Louis Laneau
- Vicar Apostolic of Siam
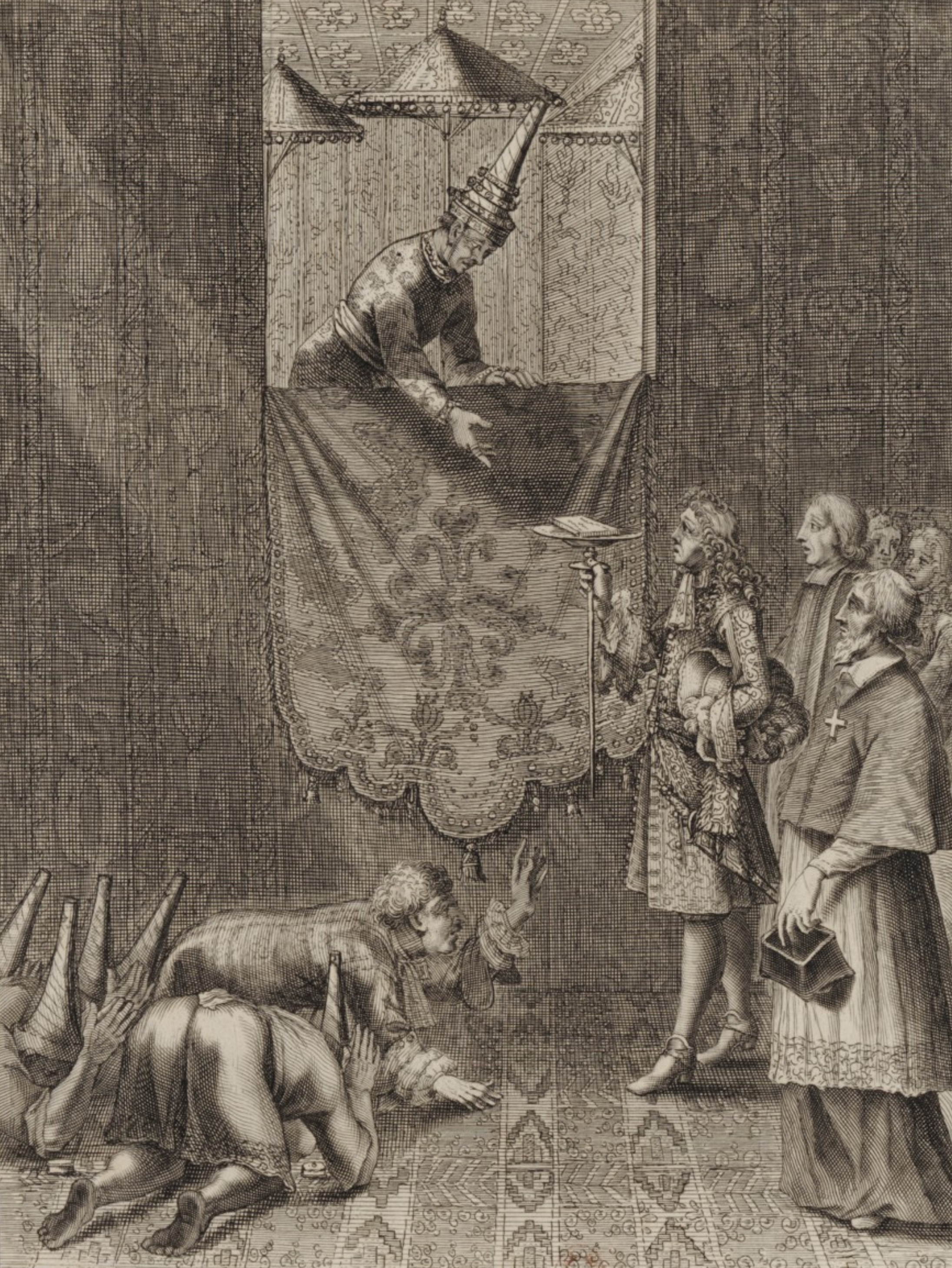
- Louis Laneau (on the right, forefront) was closely involved in the contacts with king Narai. Here, Chevalier de Chaumont presents a letter from Louis XIV to King Narai.
- Church: Catholic Church
- Diocese: Vicar Apostolic of Siam
- Predecessor: None
- Successor: Louis Champion de Cicé

Orders
- Consecration: 25 March 1674 by Pierre Lambert de la Motte

Personal details
- Born: 31 May 1637 Mondoubleau, France
- Died: March 16, 1696 (aged 58) Ayutthaya

Louis Laneau (31 May 1637 in Mondoubleau – 16 March 1696 in Ayutthaya) was a French bishop of the 17th century who was active as a missionary in the kingdom of Siam (modern Thailand). He was a member of the Paris Foreign Missions Society. He was initially nominated as the replacement of Msgr Ignace Cotolendi in charge of Nankin.

== Biography ==
Laneau was born in Mondoubleau, France. After studies, he was ordained a priest in La Société des Missions Etrangères. On 4 July 1669, Laneau was appointed Vicar Apostolic of Siam and Titular Bishop of Metellopolis. On 25 March 1674, he was consecrated bishop by Pierre Lambert de la Motte, Vicar Apostolic of Cochin with Bishop François Pallu, Vicar Apostolic of Fo-Kien, serving as co-consecrator. As Vicar Apostolic of Siam, he was head of the French Roman Catholic mission in Indochina, with its headquarters at Ayutthaya. Laneau became bishop of Ayutthaya in 1674.

Monseigneur Laneau worked at propagating the Christian faith and also took care of Annamite Christians and Japanese Christian communities in Siam. The Siamese king Narai warmly welcomed these missionaries, providing them with land for a church, a mission house, and a seminary (St Joseph's colony). He wanted to reduce Dutch and Portuguese influence in the area. Laneau had a key role in convincing the Siamese King to send an embassy to France.

During the 1688 Siamese revolution, Laneau and his missionaries were taken hostage by the Siamese, as guarantors for the execution of the retreat agreement negotiated between the French and the Siamese. As the French failed to respect several elements of the agreement, Laneau and his missionaries were imprisoned by the resentful Siamese.

Laneau was not freed from the Siamese jails until April 1691. He died in Ayutthaya on 16 March 1696.

== Works ==
- Rencontre avec un sage bouddhiste (English: "Encounter with a Buddhist sage").

A dialogue between a Christian missionary and a Buddhist sage, with a representation of the Christian doctrine with the words and concepts of Buddhism. The book was initially written in Siamese.

- La Déification des Justes (Latin: "de Deification iustorum", English: "The deification of the Just"). A book written during his captivity after the revolution.

== See also ==
- Roman Catholic Archdiocese of Bangkok
- France-Thailand relations

== Notes ==
Catholic Church titles
Preceded by Ignace Cotolendi	Titular Bishop of Metellopolis; 1669–1696	Succeeded by Angelo Vigliotti
Preceded by	Vicar Apostolic of Siam; 1669–1696	Succeeded by Louis Champion de Cicé
