= Apostolic Vicariate of Kiang-nan =

The Roman Catholic Apostolic Vicariate of Kiang-nan (Latin: Vicariatus Apostolicus Nanchinensis) was a missionary jurisdiction in mainland China, comprising the two imperial provinces of Jiangsu and Anhui, often referred to as Jiangnan (Wade-Giles: Kiang-nan). In 2026, the area is part of the Archdiocese of Nanjing and the Archbishop is Francis Savio Lu Xinping.

== History ==
The rest of this article is based on text from the 1913 Catholic Encyclopedia.

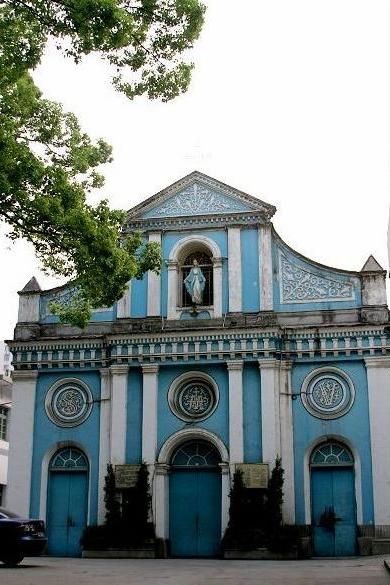
Immaculate Conception Cathedral of Hangzhou

Jiangnan's alluvial lands make the region, especially Jiangsu, one of the richest and most populous countries of China. The number of inhabitants of both provinces exceeded 60,000,000. The Jesuit priest Matteo Ricci was its first missionary, introducing the Catholic religion into this country at the end of the 16th century. He found a powerful aid in the person of the Kangxi Emperor's minister, the academician Xu Guangqi, whom he met first at Guangdong and later at Beijing. Baptized in 1603 at Nanjing, Paul Xu returned to Shanghai, his native place, and there converted many Chinese to Catholicism. In 1607 he took Lazzaro Cattaneo with him from Beijing; Cattaneo built a residence and a chapel still to be seen at Shanghai. Returning to Beijing, he first followed the Jesuit priests in their disgrace, was restored to favor in 1628, and died there in 1633. In 1641 his remains were transferred to Xujiahui, where they still rest, and the principal establishment of the new mission is in the vicinity his tomb. The Jesuits Francesco Brancati and Geronimo de Gravina were at this period building the churches of Sun-kiang, Suzhou and Chongming; Sambriani, those of Nanjing, Yangzhou and Huai'an. The mission of Jiangnan enjoyed peace from 1644 to 1661, but the missionaries were too few for the work.

In 1660 the Vicariate Apostolic of Jiangnan was created and confided to Bishop Ignace Cotolendi of the Paris Society of Foreign Missions. During the persecutions from 1664 to 1671, twenty Jesuits were exiled to Macau. Ferdinand Verbiest in Beijing obtained their release in 1671. After the death of the Kangxi Emperor, the Yongzheng Emperor exiled all the missionaries of the provinces; a few, however, succeeded in hiding themselves, and, helped by twelve or fifteen Chinese priests, attended to the wants of the Christians. In 1690 Alexander VIII created the Diocese of Nanjing, placing it under the jurisdiction of the (Portuguese Indian) Archbishop of Goa and with authority over the provinces of Jiangnan and Henan. The first bishop of Nanjing was Allessandro Ciceri of Milan, a Jesuit, consecrated at Macau on 2 February 1696. His last successor was Gaietano Pires-Pireira, a Portuguese Lazarist (d. at Beijing, 1846). After 18336 the Diocese of Nanjing was governed by Apostolic administrators until 1856, when the episcopal see was abandoned.

In 1736 the imperial state commenced a persecution which lasted a whole century. Tristan of Athemis was the first priest arrested. The superior of the mission, Anthony Joseph Henriquez, was pursued and surrendered on 21 December 1747. Both missionaries were strangled in Suzhou 17 September 1748. The process of their beatification was lengthy.

Three Jesuit missionaries followed in Jiangnan: Ignatius Perez, Martin Correa and Godefroy of Lambeckhoven, named Bishop of Nan-king on 15 May 1752, and consecrated at Macau on 22 July 1756. He remained thirty years at Jiangnan with two Chinese Jesuit priests, Mark Kwan and John Yau. It is related that in 1784, Godefroy entered Suzhou as a chair-dealer to ordain some new priests. He died on 22 May 1787, but not before proclaiming, as bishop, the dissolution of his own Society. Before his death he obtained the favor of re-entering the Society yet surviving in Russia.

For the next fifty years only, Chinese priests conducted the Jiangnan mission. In 1830, two Portuguese Lazarists, Maranda and Henriquez, arrived in Jiangnan. From 1835 to 1840, Ferdinand Faivre and Peter Lavaissière made temporary sojourns in the mission. In reality, from 1787 to the return of the Jesuits in 1840, Jiangnan was governed by native priests.

In 1833 Gaietano Peres-Pereira was made Bishop of Jiangnan, and resided at Beijing, relegating his powers to Henriquez, a Lazarist like himself residing at Macau. On 1 October 1838, Peres, last Bishop of Nan-king, conferred the powers of vicar-general to Louis de Besi, named in 1841 Vicar-Apostolic of Shandong and administrator of the diocese of Nanjing and consecrated titular Bishop of Canopus. He arrived at Jiangnan in 1842, and obtained some French Jesuits from Propaganda Fide, and from Roothan, then General of the Society of Jesus. Gotteland, Benjamin Brueye and François left Europe on 28 April 1840.

In 1842 a treaty between England and China resulted in the opening of five Chinese ports, among them Shanghai. Five new priests and one brother left France for China in 1842. They made the voyage with Marie Melchior Joseph Théodore de Lagrené, ambassador of France to Beijing, who in 1844 obtained permission in the Treaty of Whampoa for the preaching of the Catholic religion in China. Bishop de Besi appointed Brueye to found the seminary, which was opened on 3 February 1843, with twenty-three students. In 1853 it was established at Song-kia-tu. In 1849 all the Christian settlements were confided to the French Jesuits; they contained four thousand seven hundred and fifty Christians. The rebels invaded in 1853 a great part of the province and remained there eleven years. The Jesuits established themselves in 1847 at Zi-ka-wei, near the tomb of Paul Xu, at which period of the orphanages of the mission were commenced. An asylum for girls was a founded in 1855 near Wang-tan. In 1853 the Taiping rebels took possession of Nanjing, then of Shanghai, but abandoned the latter in 1854.

Bishop de Besi left for Rome in 1847, leaving the government of the mission to his coadjutor, Bishop Maresca. In 1849 the latter was named administrator of the Diocese of Nanjing, but returned to Europe, owing to ill health, on 8 April 1855. On 13 November of the same year he died at Naples. The Diocese of Nanjing was then suppressed, and the Vicariate Apostolic of Kiang-nan entrusted to the French Jesuits. Pierre André Borgniet became administrator Apostolic in 1856. During the eight years of his administrator ship the rebels laid waste all the Christian missions of Jiangnan except that of Shanghai.

Then followed the wars of the French and English against China, beginning in 1857. A treaty was signed in 1858, but the war was renewed in 1860, at the end of which entrance into China was obtained. In 1859 the rebels held only Nanjing, but suddenly became stronger. Massa was arrested by them but made his escape; his brother Louis, however, was killed by defending the orphanage of Tsai-kia-wan. The orphan asylum was pillaged and burned, and many Christians were massacred. A few Christian natives of Manila were able to defend Tung-kia-tu and Za-ka-wei. In 1862 Admirals Hope and Protet opened a campaign, but the latter was killed at Nan-kiau. Major Gordon, who commanded some four to five thousand men, gained some advantage, but was dismissed in 1866 by the Chinese. At the end of the same year the rebels were driven out of every place they had held. The missions, however, suffered much in the meantime. Vuillaume was killed on 4 March 1862; between 1856 and 1864 twenty-four missionaries died, and before the close of 1865 six or seven were victims of typhus.

Bishop Borgniet died of cholera on 31 July 1862. Hippolyte Adrien Languillat, Bishop of Sergiopolis and Vicar Apostolic of Zhili since September 1856, was named Vicar Apostolic of Jiangnan on 2 February 1865, and at once undertook to restore the ruins occasioned by the rebels. He went in Rome in 1867 and brought back with him religious Helpers of the Souls in Purgatory and some Carmelites. He founded the observatory about the same period, and took part in the First Vatican Council in 1870, but in 1874 a stroke of apoplexy almost disabled him for any active service.

Carrére suffered much at Nanjing. Driven out of this city by Li Hongzhang, he was recalled by the consul of France from Shanghai; he died on 17 August 1868. A hospital for aged men was established at Shanghai in 1867, and the St. Francis Xavier School was opened. A severe persecution broke out in 1876. In March some residences were pillaged, and a catechist massacred. On 13 July a Chinese priest was massacred with some of his students and a boy from the school. The chapel was set afire, and the bodies of the victims were consumed. The girls of the school and their teachers were taken into captivity. Everywhere the property of the Christians wee pillaged, and their chapels burned. Bishop Languillat died during this persecution, at Zi-ka-wei, on 29 November 1878.

Bishop Valentine Garnier, already chosen coadjutor, was named his successor; he was fifty-four years old, and governed the mission nineteen years. The fathers succeeded in establishing themselves finally in the centre of Ngan-hwei. In 1882, Bishop Garnier sent missionaries to Suzhou, the most northern prefecture of the province of Jiangsu. The fathers bought a house in the city, and then commenced their difficulties, which lasted fourteen years. On 5 February 1889, the European concession of Jinjiang was attacked by the Chinese, the consulate of the United States was pillaged and burned, but the church and residence of the mission was spared. On 2 May 1891, some of the rabble besieged the orphanage of the mission, but soldiers rescued the orphans. On 12 May 1891, Wuhu and then Anjing were attacked, but the presence of a French vessel saved them. However, five or six chapels were pillaged and burned in the interior of the province. Tranquility was restored, thanks to the presence of Armand Besnard. Bishop Garnier died on 14 July 1898. Bishop Simon was named Vicar Apostolic in January 1899, and consecrated on 25 June; he died on 25 Aug. of the same year at Wuhu. At the end of 1900, Bishop Paris, superior of the mission, was named Vicar Apostolic and titular Bishop of Silandus.

== See also ==
- Roman Catholic Archdiocese of Nanking
