= Francis Savio Lu Xinping =

Bishop of Nanjing

His Excellency, The Most Reverend Francis Savio Lu Xinping
- Archbishop of Nanjing
- Church: Cathedral of the Immaculate Conception
- Archdiocese: Nanjing
- Province: Jiangsu
- Installed: 2000
- Predecessor: Paul Yu Pin

Orders
- Ordination: 1989 by Matthew Yu Chengcai
- Consecration: 2000

Personal details
- Born: 1963 (age 62–63) Haimen Country, Jiangsu, China
- Denomination: Roman Catholic
- Coat of arms

Chinese name
- Simplified Chinese: 陆新平
- Traditional Chinese: 陸新平
Transcriptions
Standard Mandarin
- Hanyu Pinyin: Lù Xīnpíng

Francis Savio Lu Xinping (Chinese: 陆新平; born 1963) is a Chinese Catholic prelate who has served as Archbishop of Nanjing since 2000.

== Biography ==
Xinping was born in Haimen Country, Jiangsu, in 1963. He was educated at the Sheshan Seminar at Shanghai, and was ordained a priest in 1989 by Haima's government-approved Bishop Matthew Yu Chengcai (1917–2006).

He was one of the five priests made bishops at Nantang Church in Beijing on 6 January 2000, without a papal mandate. The chief consultant was Bishop Joseph Liu Yuanren. Xinping became Archbishop of Nanjing on 20 April 2005, succeeding Yuanren. In 2007, he contacted the Holy See to ask for forgiveness and was recognized by Pope Benedict XVI in 2008.

Xinping was elected a member of the 11th National Committee of the Chinese People's Political Consultative Conference.

Catholic Church titles
Previous: Joseph Liu Yuanren	Archbishop of the Roman Catholic Archdiocese of Nanjing; 2000	Incumbent
