= National Seminary of Catholic Church in China =

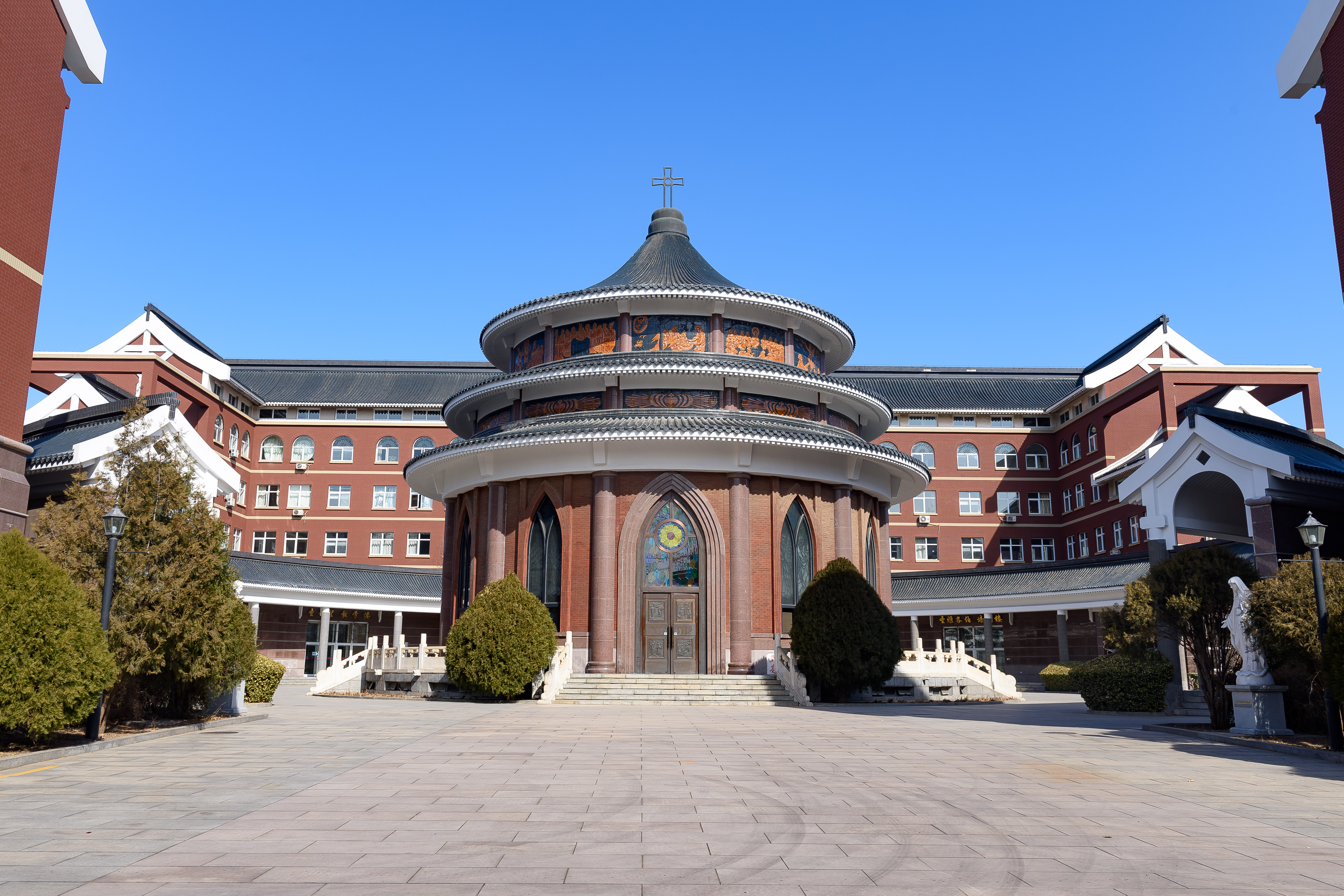
- Motto: 祈祷、勤奋、牺牲、奉献
- Motto in English: Prayer, diligence, sacrifice, dedication
- Type: Public
- Established: 1983
- Religious affiliation: Chinese Catholic Patriotic Association (Roman Catholic Church)
- President: Joseph Ma Yinglin
- Location: Daxing District, Beijing, China
- Website: www.nsccc.cn

Chinese name
- Simplified Chinese: 中国天主教神哲学院
- Traditional Chinese: 中國天主教神哲學院
Transcriptions
Standard Mandarin
- Hanyu Pinyin: Zhōngguó Tiānzhǔjiào Shénzhé Xuéyuàn

The National Seminary of Catholic Church in China (Chinese: 中国天主教神哲学院), or NSCCC, is a Catholic university in Daxing District of Beijing, capital of China.

== History ==
The NSCCC officially opened on September 24, 1983.

== List of presidents ==
No.	English name	Chinese title	Term of office	Notes
1	Anthony Tu Shihua	涂世华	1983–1991	
2	Zong Huaide	宗怀德	1991–1997	
3	Joseph Liu Yuanren	刘元仁	1998–2005	
4	Chen Shujie	陈书杰	2005–2011	
5	Joseph Ma Yinglin	马英林	2011–present	
