= Joseph Liu Yuanren =

Bishop of Nanjing

His Excellency, The Most Reverend Joseph Liu Yuanren
- Vice-President of Chinese Patriotic Catholic Association
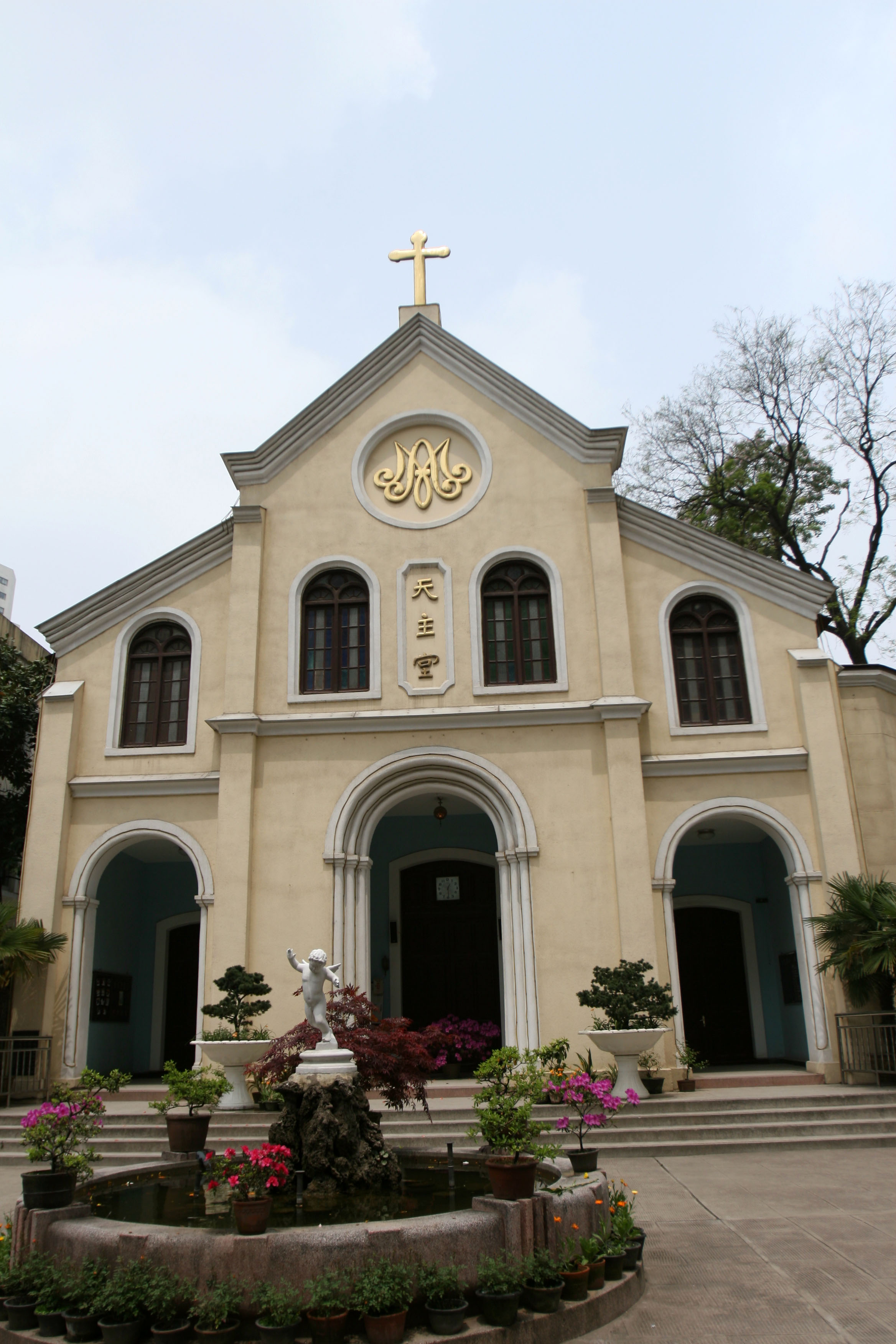
- ShiGuLu Roman Catholic Church in Nanjing
- Native name: 刘元仁
- Archdiocese: Nanjing
- Installed: 1998
- Term ended: 2005

Orders
- Ordination: 1953

Personal details
- Born: March 16, 1923 Qidong, Jiangsu, China
- Died: April 20, 2005 (aged 82) Beijing, China
- Denomination: Roman Catholic
- Education: Haimen Catholic College of Literature

Chinese name
- Traditional Chinese: 劉元仁
- Simplified Chinese: 刘元仁
Transcriptions
Standard Mandarin
- Hanyu Pinyin: Liú Yuánrén

Joseph Liu Yuanren (Chinese: 刘元仁; 16 March 1923 – 20 April 2005) was a Chinese Catholic prelate who served as Archbishop of Nanking from 1998 to 2005. He also served as vice-president of Chinese Patriotic Catholic Association from 1998 until his death in 2005.

He was a member of the Standing Committee of the Chinese People's Political Consultative Conference.

== Biography ==
Liu was born in Qidong, Jiangsu, on March 16, 1923, to a Catholic family. His six generations of ancestors were Catholics. After graduating from the Xilei Middle School, he was accepted to the Haimen Catholic College of Literature. He became a priest on June 3, 1953, in Xuhui District of Shanghai.

Liu taught at his alma mater between 1953 and 1958. In 1982 he was a pastor of the Cathedral of the Immaculate Conception, Nanjing, Jiangsu. In May 1992 he was appointed as vice-president of the National Seminary of the Chinese Catholic Church.

In December 1993, Lui was named Archbishop of Nanjing without consent of the pope and was excommunicated latae sententiae. In 1998 he was elected president of the Bishops Conference of the Catholic Church in China, president of the National Seminary of the Chinese Catholic Church and vice-president of Chinese Patriotic Catholic Association. In 2004 he was elected vice-president of the China Religious Peace Commission.

He died on April 20, 2005.

== See also ==
- Roman Catholic Archdiocese of Nanking

Catholic Church titles
Previous: Zong Huaide	Director of the National Administrative Commission of the Chinese Catholic Church; 1998-2005	Next: Michael Fu Tieshan
Previous: Zong Huaide	President of the National Seminary of Catholic Church in China; 1998-2005	Next: Chen Shujie
