= Joseph Zong Huaide (Shandong) =

Chinese Roman Catholic bishop

- President of the Catholic Patriotic Association
- Native name: 宗怀德
- Province: Shandong
- Installed: 22 May 1980
- Term ended: 17 January 1998
- Predecessor: Ignatius Pi Shushi
- Successor: Michael Fu Tieshan

Orders
- Ordination: 1943

Personal details
- Born: May 12, 1917 Huantai County, Shandong, China
- Died: June 27, 1997 (aged 80) Beijing, China
- Buried: Zhangjiadian Catholic Church
- Denomination: Roman Catholic
- Education: Yaohan Theology and Philosophy; Fu Jen Catholic University

Chinese name
- Traditional Chinese: 宗懷德
- Simplified Chinese: 宗怀德
Transcriptions
Standard Mandarin
- Hanyu Pinyin: Zōng Huáidé

Zong Huaide (Chinese: 宗怀德; 12 May 1917 – 27 June 1997) was a Chinese Roman Catholic Bishop of Roman Catholic Diocese of Shandong, China. In the final years of his life, he achieved high offices in the church and CCP-supported Catholic organizations.

He was a member of the 5th and 6th National Committee of the Chinese People's Political Consultative Conference and a member of the 7th and 8th Standing Committee of the Chinese People's Political Consultative Conference.

== Biography ==
Zong was born in Huantai County, Shandong, on May 12, 1917, to a Catholic family. He had six young brothers and sisters. After graduating from the Yaohan Theology and Philosophy (Chinese: 耀汉神哲学院) in Jinan, he was consecrated as priest in Zhoucun District of Zibo City.

During the Second Sino-Japanese War, he propagated Counter-Japanese and National Salvation throughout Shandong province. In 1948 he was accepted to the Fu Jen Catholic University. Zong was ordained bishop in 1958. On August 24, 1966, at the beginning of the Cultural Revolution, the Red Guards had attacked the Catholic Church, volumes of scriptures, historical documents, and other works of art were either removed, damaged or destroyed in the massive socialist movement. Zong was forced to take part in reeducation through labour. In June 1970, after the Sino-Soviet border conflict, he was sent to home to raise hogs or pigs. On October 1, 1978, Zong was transferred to Jinan as a member of the Shandong Provincial Committee of the Chinese People's Political Consultative Conference. In 1980 he was elected president of the Catholic Patriotic Association, deputy director of the National Administrative Commission of the Chinese Catholic Church and vice-president of the Bishops Conference of the Catholic Church in China (BCCCC).

Before his death, Zong wrote to the Pope to repent and was forgiven by the Pope. On June 27, 1997, he died in Beijing, aged 80. He was buried in Zhangjiadian Catholic Church, Zibo, Shandong.

Catholic Church titles
| Previous: Ignatius Pi Shushi | President of the Catholic Patriotic Association; 1980-1998 | Next: Michael Fu Tieshan |
| Previous: Louis Zhang Jiashu | Director of the National Administrative Commission of the Chinese Catholic Church; 1988-1997 | Next: Joseph Liu Yuanren |
| Previous: Anthony Tu Shihua | President of the National Seminary of Catholic Church in China; 1991-1997 | Next: Joseph Liu Yuanren |
