= Archdiocese of Nanjing =

Roman Catholic archdiocese in China

Archdiocese of Nanjing Archidioecesis Nanchinensis 天主教南京总教区
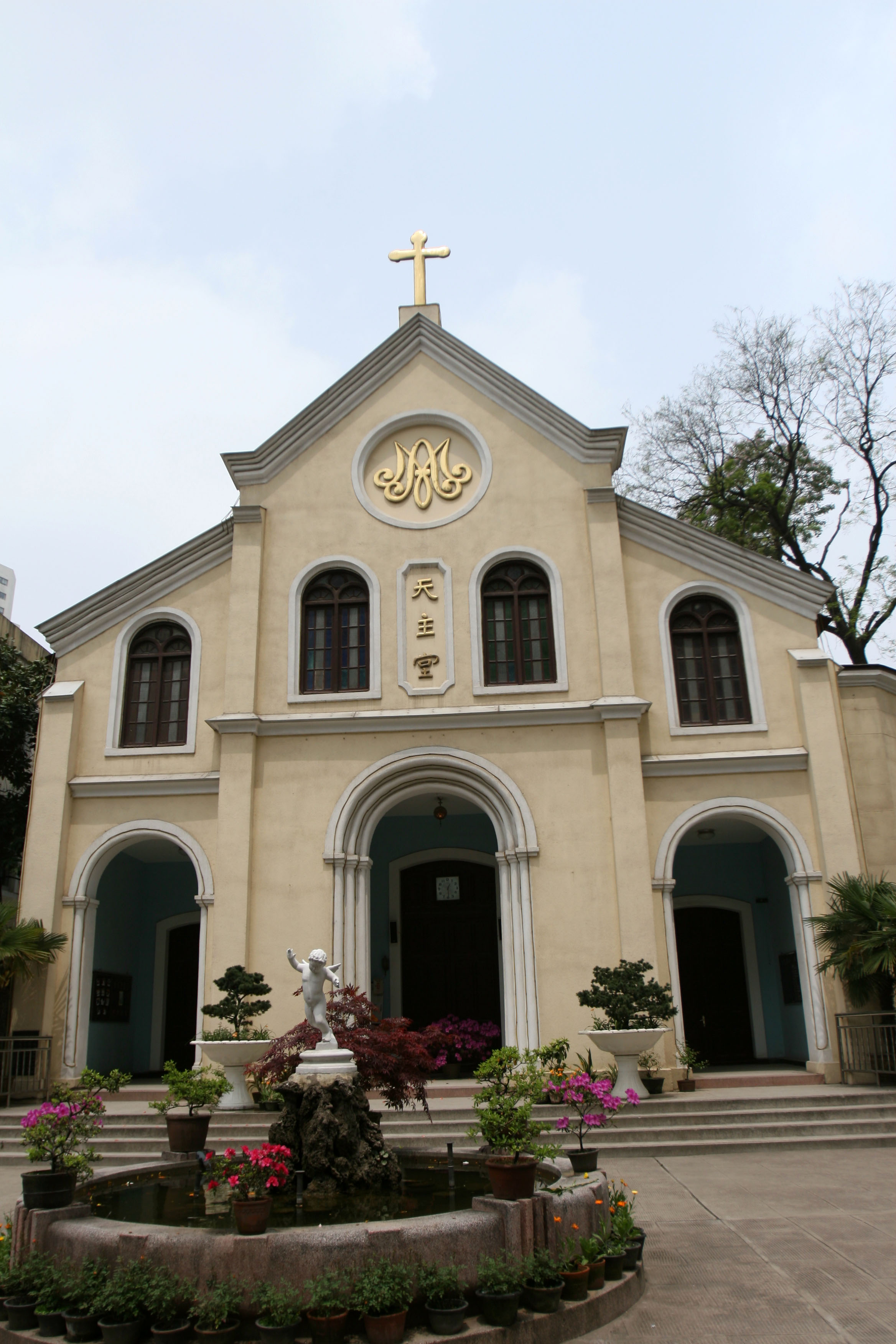
- Cathedral of the Immaculate Conception, Nanjing

Location
- Country: China
- Ecclesiastical province: Nanjing
- Coordinates: 32.044751°N 118.778343°E

Statistics
- Population: Total; Catholics: (as of 1949); 6,000,000; 32,536 (0.5%)

Information
- Rite: Latin Rite
- Cathedral: Cathedral of the Immaculate Conception in Nanjing

Current leadership
- Pope: Leo XIV
- Metropolitan Archbishop: Francis Savio Lu Xinping

The Roman Catholic Archdiocese of Nanjing/Nanking (Latin: Archidioecesis Nanchinensis) is a Roman Catholic diocese of the Catholic Church in China.

== History ==
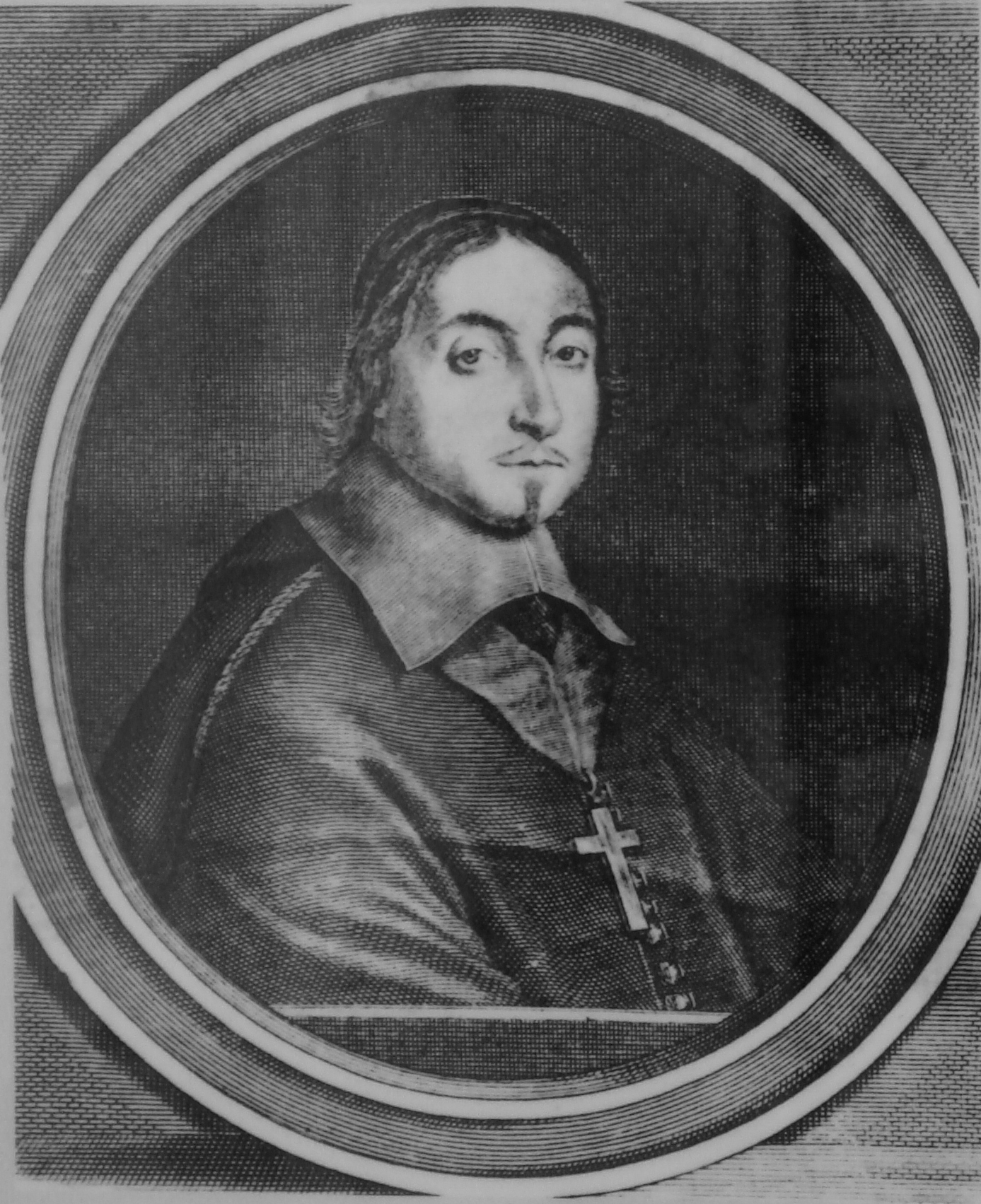
Mgr Ignace Cotolendi (1630-1662) was the first appointed bishop of the Roman Catholic Archdiocese of Nanjing.

It was erected as the Apostolic Vicariate of Nanjing in 1659 by Pope Alexander VII, and promoted to a diocese by Pope Alexander VIII on April 10, 1690. On 15 October 1696, its territory was reduced by Pope Innocent XII to two provinces: Jiangnan (the present day provinces of Anhui, Jiangsu, and Shanghai) and Ho-nan (Henan province). The diocese was demoted to the Apostolic Vicariate of Kiangnan on January 21, 1856 by Pope Pius IX, and its name was later changed to the Apostolic Vicariate of Kiangsu on August 8, 1921 and to the Vicariate Apostolic of Nanjing on May 1, 1922. Pope Pius XII elevated it on April 11, 1946 to the rank of a metropolitan archdiocese, with the suffragan sees of Haimen, Shanghai, Suzhou, and Xuzhou.

The archdiocese's motherchurch and thus seat of its archbishop is the Cathedral of the Immaculate Conception also known as the Shigu Road church. There were a number of years without a bishop after the death of Paul Cardinal Yü Pin on August 16, 1978, because of the irregular relations between the Communist government and the Holy See. On January 6, 2000, Francis Savio Lu Xinping was ordained the new bishop of Nanjing along with four others in an illicit ceremony in Beijing's South Cathedral. Since then he has been reconciled to the Holy See.

== List of Ordinaries of Nanjing ==
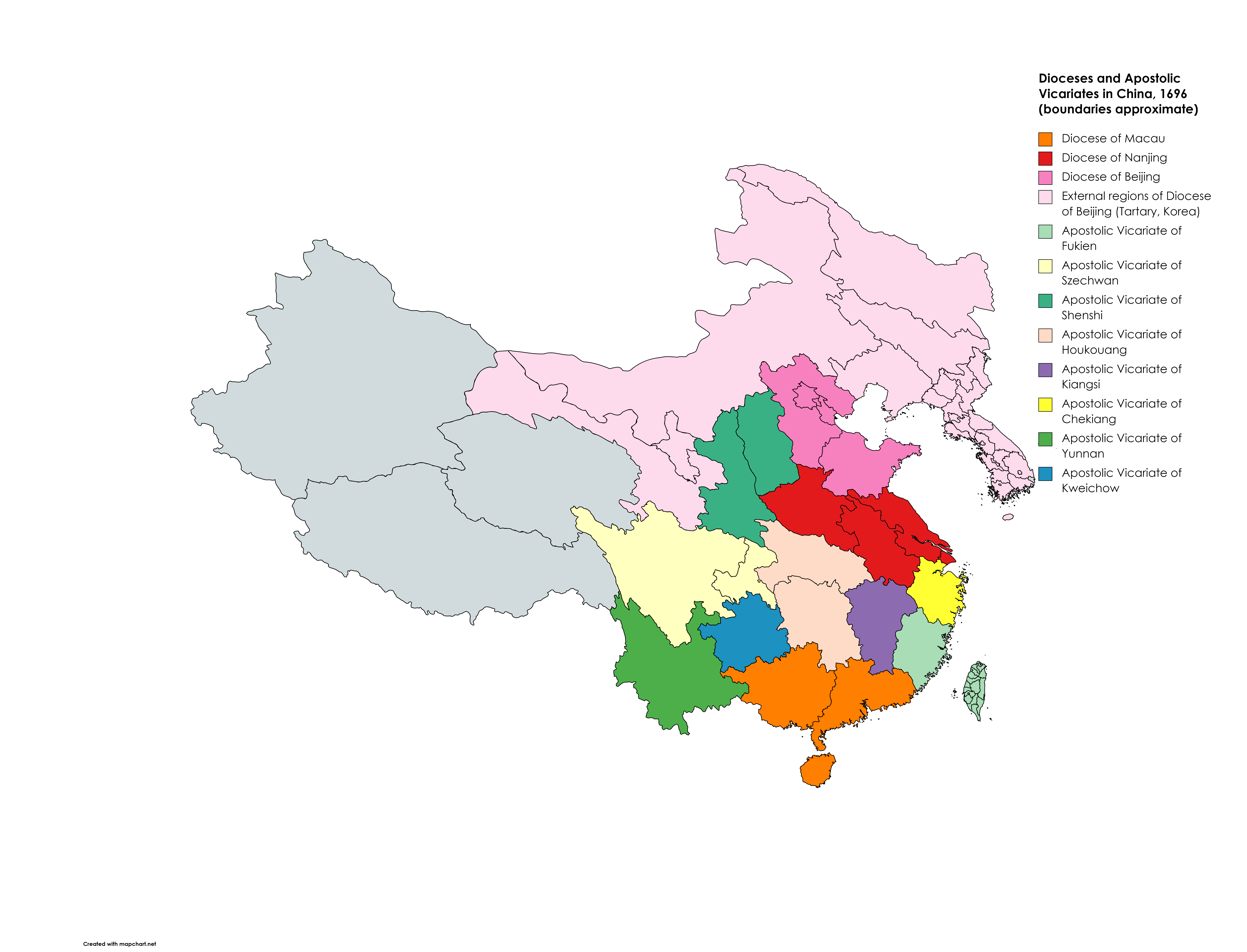
Dioceses and Apostolic Vicariates of China in 1696

=== Vicar Apostolic of Nanjing ===
- Ignace Cotolendi (1660–1662)

sede vacante

- Gregory Luo Wen-zao, O.P. (1674–1690)

=== Bishop of Nanjing ===
- Gregory Luo Wen-zao, O.P. (1690–1691), also known as Gregory Lopez in the Philippines
  - Father Giovanni Francesco Nicolai, O.F.M. (Administrator, 1691–1694), nominated by Wen-zao as his successor on May 29, 1688 under authority granted by the Holy See, served as administrator upon Wen-zao's death, not consecrated until 1700 as Vicar Apostolic of Houkouang
  - Father Francisco Spinola, S.J. (Coadjutator, 1690–1694), appointed 1690 but did not take effect as he died in 1694 before reaching China, never consecrated
- Alessandro Ciceri, S.J. (1694–1703)
- Antonio de Silva, S.J. (1707–1726)
- António Paes Godinho, S.J. (1718–1721)
- Emmanuel de Jesus-Maria-Joseph, O.F.M. (1721–1739)
- Francesco de Santa Rosa de Viterbo, O.F.M. Ref. (1742–1750)
- Gottfried Xaver von Laimbeckhoven, S.J. (1752–1787)
- Alexandre de Gouvea (Gouveia), T.O.R. (1787–1804)
- Cayetano Pires Pireira, C.M. (1804–1838)

=== Vicar Apostolic of Kiangnan ===
- André-Pierre Borgniet, S.J. (1859–1862)
- Adrien-Hippolyte Languillat, SJ (1864–1878)
- Valentin Garnier, S.J. (1879–1898)
- Jean-Baptiste Simon, S.J. (1899)
- Próspero París, S.J. (1900–1931)

=== Vicar Apostolic of Kiangsu ===
- Próspero París, S.J. (1900–1931)

=== Vicar Apostolic of Nanjing ===
- Próspero París, S.J. (1900–1931)
- Auguste Haouisée, S.J. (1931–1933)
- Paul Yü Pin (1936–1946)

=== Archdiocese of Nanjing ===
- Paul Yü Pin (1946–1978)
- John Li Wei-guang (15 Nov 1959 - 1966)
- Joseph Qian Hui-min (24 Jul 1981 - 20 May 1993)
- Joseph Liu Yuanren (7 Dec 1993 - 20 Apr 2005)
- Francis Xavier Lu Xinping (2000–present)

== See also ==
- Cathedral of the Immaculate Conception in Nanjing
- Christianity in China
- Roman Catholicism in China
- Chinese Patriotic Catholic Association
- List of Catholic cathedrals in China
- List of Roman Catholic dioceses in China
- List of Roman Catholic dioceses (structured view)-Episcopal Conference of China
