= Anthony Liu Bainian =

Chinese Catholic leader (born 1934)

Liu Bainian
- Chinese: 刘柏年
- Born: 1934 (age 91–92)
- Other name: Anthony Liu

Appointments

Executive Member of the CPPCC
- Incumbent
- Assumed office 2008
- Chairman: Jia Qinglin

Vice Chairman of the Catholic Patriotic Association
- In office September 1992 – 2010
- Chairman: Zong Huaide; Fu Tieshan

Liu Bainian, or Anthony Liu, is the honorary chairman of the state-run Catholic Patriotic Association (CPA) and the Bishops Conference of the Catholic Church in China (BCCCC), the body which oversees the selection and ordination of bishops in China.

Born in Shandong Province, Liu was named secretary-general of the CPA in 1980, and subsequently served as vice president of the organization, which operates under the control of the State Administration for Religious Affairs. Liu has stated his belief that the government of the People's Republic of China should appoint its own bishops, without recognizing the authority of the Holy See.
