= Ignatius Pi Shushi =

Chinese Catholic bishop and founding president of Catholic Patriotic Association

- President of the Catholic Patriotic Association
- Native name: 皮漱石
- Province: Liaoning
- Installed: 2 August 1957
- Term ended: died 16 May 1978
- Predecessor: New position
- Successor: Joseph Zong Huaide

Orders
- Ordination: 1928

Personal details
- Born: February 1, 1897 Liaoyang County, Liaoning, Qing dynasty
- Died: May 16, 1978 (aged 81) Beijing, People's Republic of China
- Buried: Tieling Catholic Cemetery
- Denomination: Roman Catholic

Chinese name
- Chinese: 皮漱石
Transcriptions
Standard Mandarin
- Hanyu Pinyin: Pí Shùshí

Ignatius Pi Shushi (Chinese: 皮漱石; 1 February 1897 – 16 May 1978) was a Chinese Catholic Bishop of the Diocese of Liaoning, China. He was one of the founding fathers and the first president of the Catholic Patriotic Association, the top CCP-supported Catholic institution in China.

He was a member of the 3rd and 4th National Committee of the Chinese People's Political Consultative Conference.

== Biography ==
Pi was born Pi Jinxu (Chinese: 皮金旭) in Shaling Village of Liaoyang County, Fengtian Province, on February 1, 1897, to a Catholic family. He was being christened in 1906. From 1909 to 1927 he studied theology at Shenyang Monastery. He was ordained a priest in 1927. He became a priest of Dalian Catholic Church in 1942. On July 26, 1949 he was appointed archbishop of the Roman Catholic Archdiocese of Shenyang by Pope Pius XII, becoming the fourth Chinese archbishop from China, after Thomas Tien Ken-sin, Paul Yü Pin, and Joseph Zhou Jishi. On October 11 of that same year, he was ordained by Antonio Riberi.

After the establishment of the Communist State in October 1951, he was put in prison was released in 1955. In July 1957 he was elected president of the newly founded Chinese Patriotic Catholic Association. During the Cultural Revolution, he suffered political persecution. He died in Beijing on May 16, 1978, aged 81. He was buried in the Babaoshan Revolutionary Cemetery. In 2005 his ashes were buried in the Tieling Catholic Cemetery.

Catholic Church titles
Previous: New position	President of the Catholic Patriotic Association; 1957-1980	Next: Joseph Zong Huaide
