= Brancati =

Brancati is a surname. Notable people with the surname include:

- Chiara Brancati (born 1981), Italian water polo player
- Francesco Brancati (1607–1671), Italian Jesuit missionary
- Francesco Lorenzo Brancati di Lauria (1612–1693), Italian cardinal
- Paula Brancati (born 1989), Canadian actress
- Vitaliano Brancati (1907–1954), Italian writer
