= Pulcherianopolis =

Pulcherianopolis or Poulcherianoupolis (Ancient Greek: Πουλχεριανούπολις) may refer to:

- Pulcherianopolis (Epirus), ancient town of Epirus Nova, now in Albania
- Pulcherianopolis (Phrygia), ancient town of Phrygia Pacatiana, now in Albania
