= Gesù Divin Lavoratore =

Church of Jesus the Divine Worker
- Iesu Divini Opificis (in Latin)
- Chiesa Parrocchiale di Gesù Divino Lavoratore (in Italian)
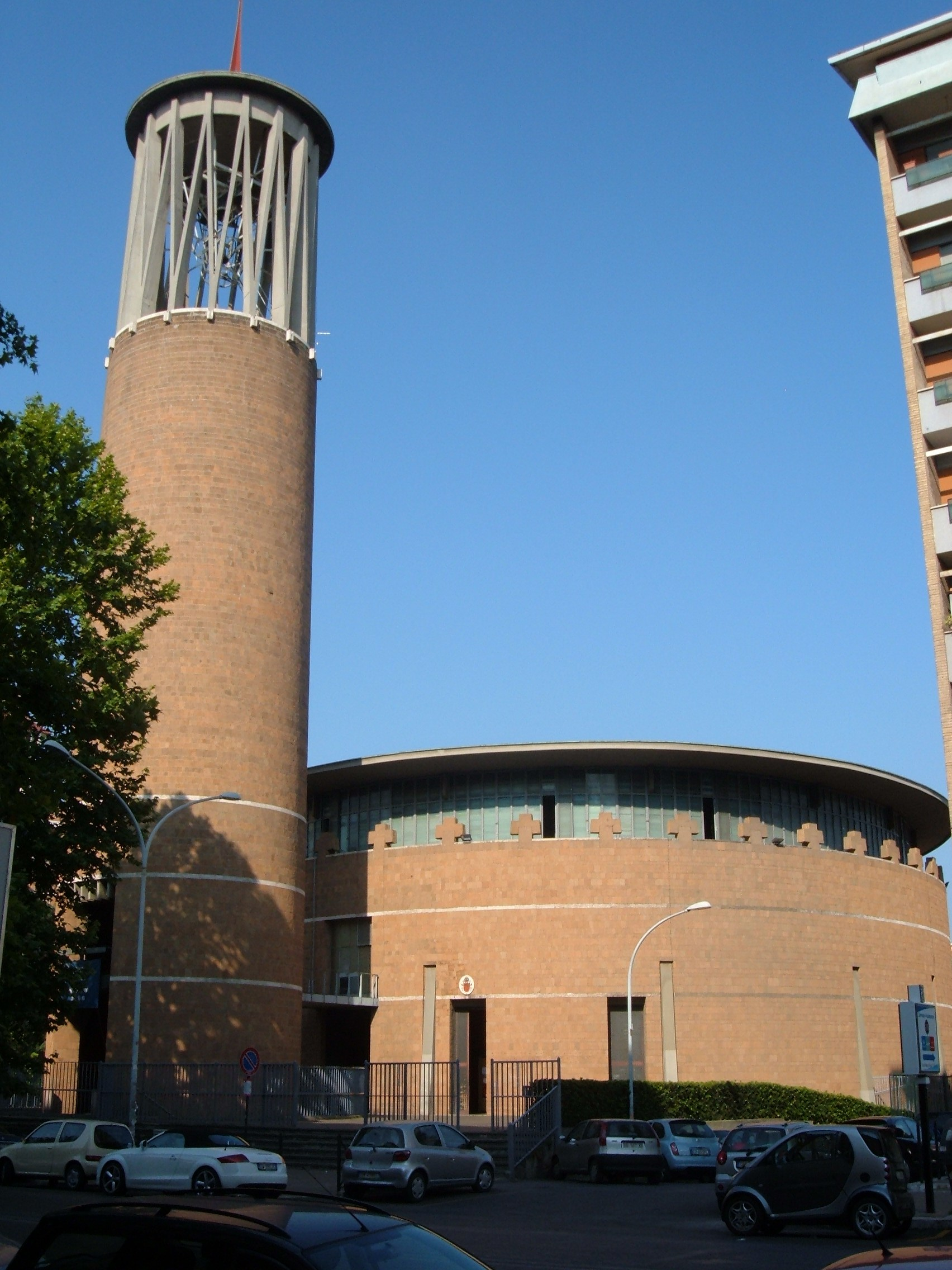
- Facade
- Click on the map for a fullscreen view
- 41°52′07″N 12°27′59″E
- Location: Via Oderisi da Gubbio 16, Rome
- Country: Italy
- Denomination: Roman Catholic
- Tradition: Roman Rite
- Website: Official website

History
- Status: Titular church
- Dedication: Jesus (as the Divine Worker)
- Consecrated: 1960

Architecture
- Architect: Raffaello Fagnoni
- Architectural type: Church
- Groundbreaking: 1955
- Completed: 1960

Administration
- District: Lazio
- Province: Rome

The Church of Jesus the Divine Worker (Gesù Divin Lavoratore) is a titular church in Rome, in the Portuense district, on Via Oderisi da Gubbio.

== History ==
The first stone of the building, designed by architect Raffaello Fagnoni, was laid on 24 March 1955; on 15 May 1960, it was consecrated by Cardinal Clemente Micara. The dedication to Jesus worker was commissioned by the popes themselves as a sign of the Church's presence in the world of work. The church is a home parish, established on March 12,1955, with the decree "Paterna solicitude"; in 1969 Paul VI awarded her the title of cardinal of "Jesus Divine Worker". Christoph Schönborn, OP has been the incumbent cardinal protector since 1998.

== Description ==
It is circular in shape and is characterized by the high bell tower, also in a cylindrical shape. Outside it is red brick. Inside is the chancel floor, a crucifix over a background of multicolored tiles as well as a ceiling of reinforced concrete beams.

== Cardinal Priest ==
Pope Paul VI established it as a titular church on 30 April 1969.

- Paul Yü Pin 30 April 1969 appointed-16 August 1978 died
- Joseph Louis Bernardin 2 February 1983 appointed-14 November 1996 died
- Christoph Schönborn, OP 21 February 1998 appointed-present
