= Matthew Yu Chengcai =

Chinese Catholic bishop (b. 1917)

His Excellency, The Most Reverend Matthew Yu Chengcai
- Bishop of Haimen
- Native name: 郁成才
- Diocese: Haimen
- Successor: Joseph Shen Bin

Orders
- Ordination: 1959

Personal details
- Born: August 27, 1917 Chongming District, Shanghai, China
- Died: March 18, 2006 (aged 88) Nantong, Jiangsu, China
- Denomination: Roman Catholic
- Education: Fu Jen Catholic University

Chinese name
- Chinese: 郁成才
Transcriptions
Standard Mandarin
- Hanyu Pinyin: Yù Chéngcái

Matthew Yu Chengcai (Chinese: 郁成才; 27 August 1917 - 18 March 2006) was a Chinese Catholic who served as Bishop of Haimen beginning in 1959 over objections from the Holy See.

He was a member of the 8th, 9th, and 10th National Committees of the Chinese People's Political Consultative Conference.

== Biography ==
Yu was born in Chongming District of Shanghai, on August 27, 1917, to a Catholic family. After high school, he entered the Sacred Heart Cathedral in Haimen and then studied theology at the Xuhui Catholic Church. He was ordained a priest in 1946. In August 1946 he was accepted to the Fu Jen Catholic University in Beijing, after university in 1950, he was assigned to the Xilei High School (Chinese: 天主教锡类中学) as its president. In August 1954 he worked in the Diocese of Haimen.

In November 1959 he was made Bishop of Haimen without the consent of the pope and was excommunicated latae sententiae. He was among several Chinese priests who became bishops without a papal mandate in the People's Republic of China between 1958 and 1962. Later, after the Cultural Revolution, the Holy See legitimized a number of the illegitimate bishops who were still alive, but Bishop Yu was not among them.

He died of illness on March 18, 2006.

== See also ==
- Christianity in Jiangsu
