= Yeşiloba, Bekilli =

Village in Turkey

Yeşiloba
- Neighbourhood
- Location in Turkey Yeşiloba (Turkey Aegean)
- Coordinates: 38°14′38″N 29°18′14″E
- Country: Turkey
- Province: Denizli
- District: Bekilli
- Population (2022): 366
- Time zone: UTC+3 (TRT)

Yeşiloba, formerly known as Medele, is a neighbourhood of the municipality and district of Bekilli, Denizli Province, Turkey. Its population is 366 (2022).

It is probably the site of ancient and medieval Motella.
