= Ignace Cotolendi =

French bishop

Most Reverend Ignace Cotolendi
- Titular Archbishop of Metellopolis; Vicar Apostolic of Nanjing
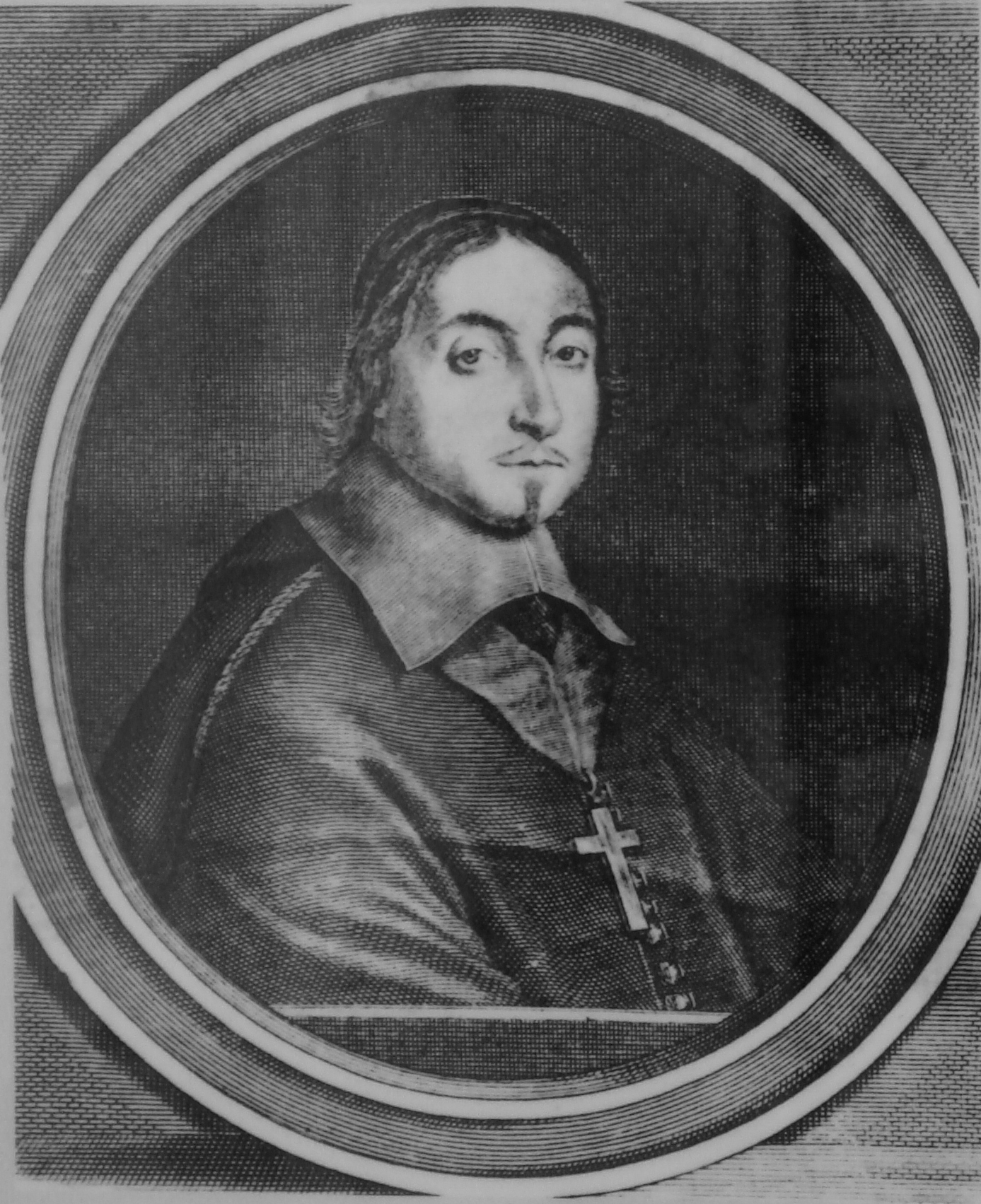
- Mgr Ignace Cotolendi (1630-1662).
- Church: Catholic Church
- In office: 1660–1661

Orders
- Ordination: March 1653
- Consecration: 7 Nov 1660 by François de Harlay de Champvallon

Personal details
- Born: 23 March 1630 Brignoles
- Died: 16 August 1662 (age 32) India

Ignace Cotolendi MEP (23 March 1630 – 16 August 1662) was a French bishop. He was a founding member of the Paris Foreign Missions Society and became a missionary in Asia.

== Life ==
Born in Brignoles, Var, Cotolendi was recruited by Alexander de Rhodes, SJ, as a secular clergy volunteer to become a missionary in Asia, together with François Pallu and Pierre Lambert de la Motte. These were sent to the Far-East as Apostolic vicars.

In 1660 Ignace Cotolendi was nominated as titular Bishop of Metellopolis and Vicar Apostolic of Nanjing, with three regions of northeastern China, Tartary and Korea under his responsibility. On 6 November 1660, he was consecrated bishop in Paris by François de Harlay de Champvallon, Archbishop of Rouen with Toussaint de Forbin de Janson, Titular Bishop of Philadelphia in Arabia, and François Pallu, Titular Bishop of Heliopolis in Augustamnica, serving as co-consecrators. He was the first Bishop of what is now the Archdiocese of Nanjing.

The three bishops left France (1660–62) to go to their respective missions, and crossed Persia and India on foot, since Portugal would have refused to take non-Padroado missionaries by ship, and the Dutch and the English refused to take Catholic missionaries. Cotolendi left with three missionaries on 3 September 1661. After travelling overland to India, Ignace Cotolendi died near Masulipatam as he was waiting for his passage to Siam.

== See also ==
- France-Thailand relations

== Notes ==
Catholic Church titles
Preceded by	Titular Bishop of Metellopolis; 1660–1661	Succeeded by Louis Laneau
Preceded by None	Vicar Apostolic of Nanking; 1660–1661	Succeeded by Gregory Luo Wenzao
