= Diocese of Haimen =

Roman Catholic diocese in China

Coordinates: 31°53′N 121°10′E

Diocese of Haimen Dioecesis Haemenensis 天主教海门教区

Location
- Country: China
- Ecclesiastical province: Nanjing

Statistics
- Area: 13,500 km^{2} (5,200 sq mi)

Information
- Denomination: Catholic Church
- Sui iuris church: Latin Church
- Rite: Roman Rite
- Cathedral: Cathedral of the Good Shepherd in Nantong, Jiangsu

Current leadership
- Pope: Leo XIV
- Bishop: sede vacante
- Metropolitan Archbishop: Francis Lu Xin-ping

The Diocese of Haimen (Latin: Haemenen(sis), Chinese: 海門) is a Latin Church ecclesiastical territory or diocese of the Catholic Church located in Haimen (Nantong), China. It is a suffragan diocese in the ecclesiastical province of the metropolitan Archdiocese of Nanjing.

== History ==
- August 11, 1926: Established as Apostolic Vicariate of Haimen (海门宗座代牧区), from the Apostolic Vicariate of Nanjing 南京
- April 11, 1946: Promoted as Diocese of Haimen 海門

== Leadership ==
- Bishops of Haimen 海門
  - Bishop Joseph Shen Bin (April 21, 2010 – July 15, 2023)
  - Bishop Mark Yuan Wen-zai (July 21, 1989 - March 2007)
  - Bishop Matthew Yu Cheng-cai (1959 - 2006; non-canonical)
  - Bishop Simon Chu Kai-min, S.J. (朱開敏) (April 11, 1946 – February 22, 1960)
- Vicars Apostolic of Haimen 海門
  - Bishop Simon Chu Kai-min, S.J. (朱開敏) (August 2, 1926 – April 11, 1946)
