= Michael Fu Tieshan =

Chinese Roman Catholic bishop

Bishop Fu Tieshan
- 傅铁山
- Bishop Michael Fu Tieshan

President of Catholic Patriotic Association
- In office 10th National People's Congress
- In office 1998–2010
- Preceded by: Joseph Zong Huaide
- Succeeded by: Anthony Liu (acting); John Fang Xingyao

Vice Chairman of the Standing Committee of the National People's Congress
- In office 2003–2007

Personal details
- Born: November 3, 1931 Qingyuan County, Hebei Province, China
- Died: April 20, 2007 (aged 75) Beijing, China

Bishop Michael Fu Tieshan (Simplified Chinese: 傅铁山, Traditional Chinese: 傅鐵山; November 3, 1931 – April 20, 2007) of Beijing was a top leader of the Catholic Patriotic Association (CCPA).

== Biography ==
Coat of Arms of Bishop Michael Fu Tieshan

In 1931, Fu was born in Qingyuan County, Hebei province. As a youth, he entered minor seminary. In 1956, he was ordained a priest.

From 1963 to 1966, he studied at Red Flag University in Beijing.

The historical record is unclear on Fu's experience during the Cultural Revolution. At some point, Fu married.

In 1979 was made a bishop by Beijing. He was the first state-appointed bishop since the Cultural Revolution. The appointment lacked the approval of the pope.

In 1981, Fu was a part of the first delegation that the CCPA sent to an international meeting, attending an ecumenical meeting organised by the Canadian Council of Churches.

He was appointed chairman of the Chinese Catholic Patriotic Association in 1998. He was acting president of the government-recognized Bishops' Conference of the Catholic Church in China. He was named vice chairman of the standing committee of the National People's Congress, China's legislature, in 2003.

Fu died in Beijing Hospital from lung cancer. His death was announced in Beijing by the Xinhua news agency.

Anthony Liu Bainian, vice chairman of the Patriotic Association, told UCA News, an Asian church news agency, that Fu wanted to "see his priests, whom he hasn't met for a long time" due to his long illness.

He was succeeded by Joseph Li Shan.

Catholic Church titles
Previous: Joseph Zong Huaide	President of the Catholic Patriotic Association; 1998-2010	Next: John Fang Xingyao
