= Anthony Tu Shihua =

Anthony Tu Shihua OFM
- Bishop of Puqi (Puchi)
- Native name: 塗世華
- Church: Catholic Church
- Diocese: Diocese of Puqi (Puchi)
- Elected: 22 September 2018 Posthumously
- In office: 2001 – 4 January 2017
- Predecessor: Joseph Li Taonan
- Previous post: Bishop of Hanyang (1959-2001)

Orders
- Ordination: April 1944
- Consecration: 26 July 1959 by Joseph Li Taonan

Personal details
- Born: 22 November 1919 Mianyang, Hupei, Republic of China
- Died: 4 January 2017 (aged 97) Beijing, China

Anthony Tu Shihua (Chinese: 塗世華; 22 November 1919 – 4 January 2017) was a bishop of the Chinese Patriotic Catholic Association.

== Biography ==
Ordained to the Roman Catholic priesthood in 1944, Tu Shihua was ordained a Roman Catholic bishop without papal mandate in 1959 for the Chinese Patriotic Catholic Association and served as the illegitimate bishop of the Roman Catholic Diocese of Hanyang.

A few months before his death, Bishop Shihua asked to be readmitted into full communion with the Pope, who welcomed him with the title of Bishop Emeritus of Puli.

Shihua died in Beijing, China on 4 January 2017, aged 98.
