= Mondoubleau =

- Commune
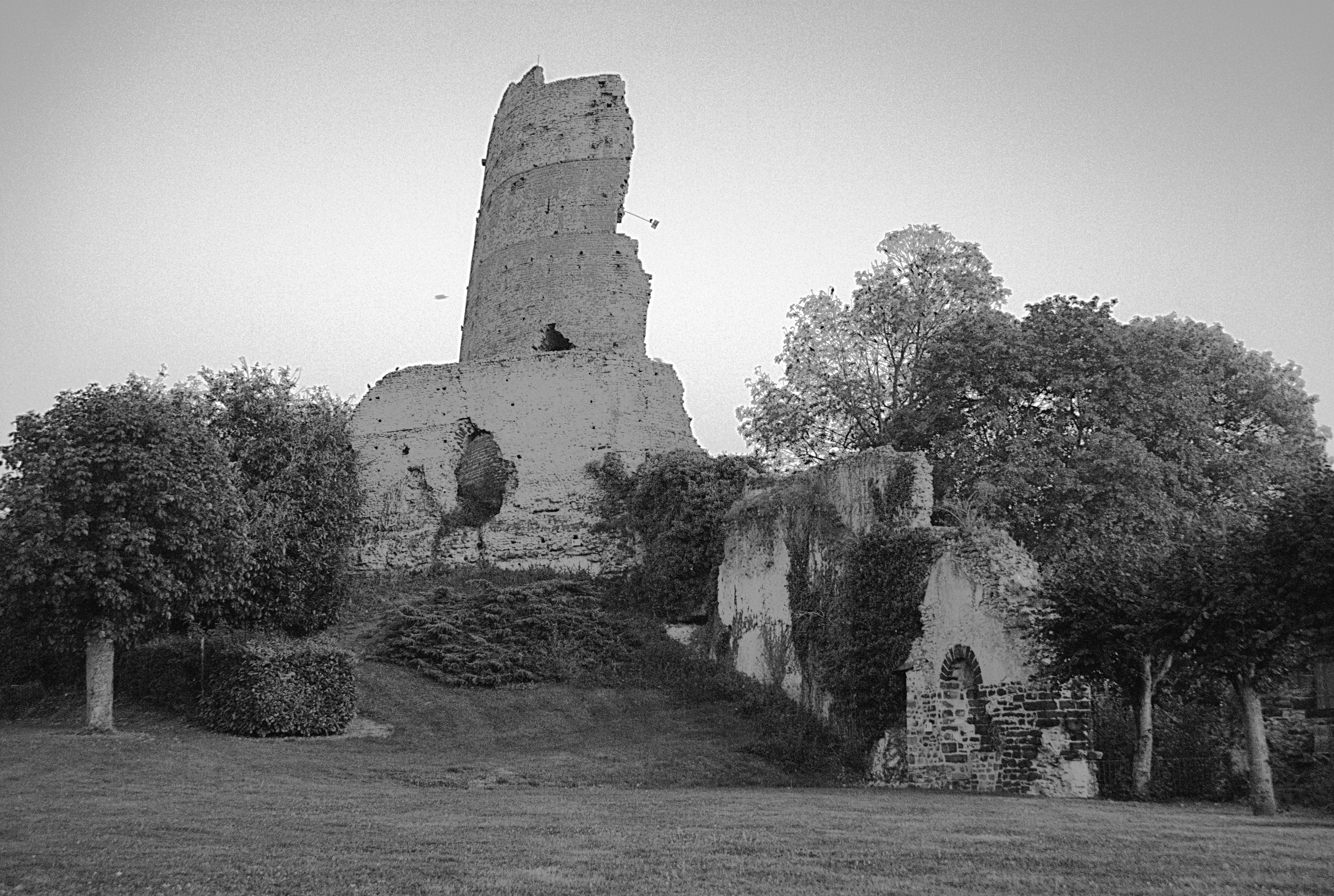
- Ruins of the chateau of Mondoubleau

- Coat of arms
- Location of Mondoubleau
- Location within France Location within Centre-Val de Loire
- Coordinates: 47°58′55″N 0°54′00″E
- Country: France
- Region: Centre-Val de Loire
- Department: Loir-et-Cher
- Arrondissement: Vendôme
- Canton: Le Perche
- Intercommunality: Collines du Perche

Government
  - Mayor (2022–2026): Jean-Claude Thuillier
- Area^{1}: 4.84 km^{2} (1.87 sq mi)
- Elevation: 118 m (387 ft)
- Highest elevation: 166 m (545 ft)
- Lowest elevation: 110 m (360 ft)
- Population (2023): 1,297
  - Density: 268/km^{2} (694/sq mi)
- Time zone: UTC+01:00 (CET)
  - Summer (DST): UTC+02:00 (CEST)
- INSEE/Postal code: 41143 /41170
- ^{1} French Land Register data, which excludes lakes, ponds, glaciers > 1 km^{2} (0.386 sq mi or 247 acres) and river estuaries.

Mondoubleau (French pronunciation: [mɔ̃dublo]) is a commune in the Loir-et-Cher department of central France.

== Population ==
Historical population
Year	Pop.	±% p.a.
1968	1,438	—
1975	1,725	+2.63%
1982	1,640	−0.72%
1990	1,557	−0.65%
1999	1,608	+0.36%
2007	1,498	−0.88%
2012	1,490	−0.11%
2017	1,335	−2.17%
2023	1,297	−0.48%
Source: INSEE

== See also ==
- Communes of the Loir-et-Cher department
