= Pierre Lambert de la Motte =

French bishop and missionary (1624–1679)

Servant of God Pierre Lambert de la Motte
- Apostolic Vicar of Cochin
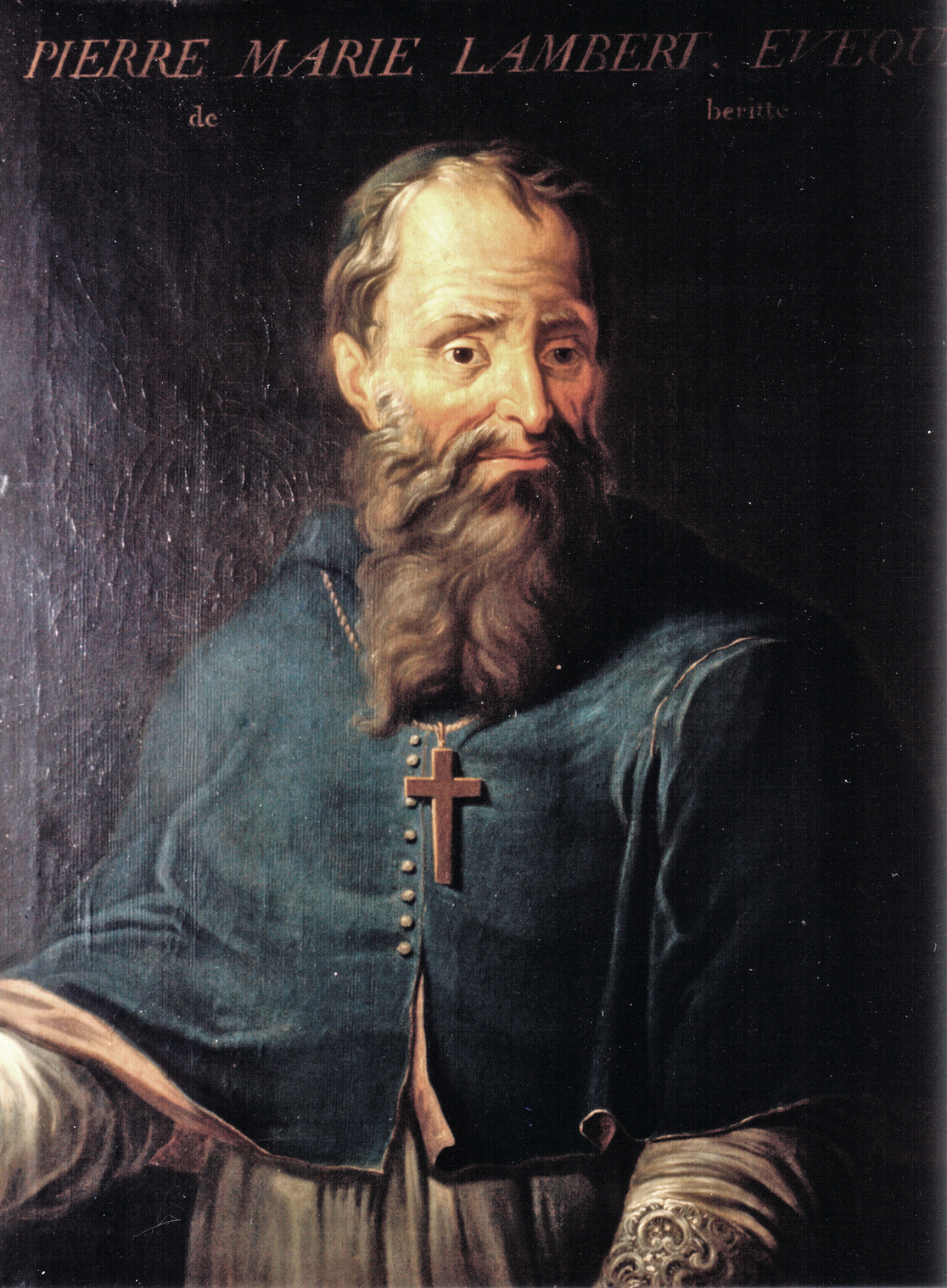
- Church: Catholic Church
- Diocese: Apostolic Vicararite of Cochin
- Predecessor: None
- Successor: Guillaume Mahot

Orders
- Consecration: 11 June 1660 by Victor Le Bouthillier

Personal details
- Born: 16 January 1624 La Boissière, Calvados, France
- Died: 15 June 1679 (aged 55) Ayutthaya

Pierre Lambert de la Motte, MEP (French pronunciation: [pjɛʁ lɑ̃bɛʁ də la mɔt]; 16 January 1624 – 15 June 1679) was a French Catholic prelate who was a founding member of the Paris Foreign Missions Society and a missionary in Asia.

== Biography ==
Lambert de la Motte was born 16 January 1624 in La Boissière, Calvados. He was ordained a priest on 27 December 1655 and was recruited by Alexander de Rhodes, SJ, as a secular clergy volunteer to become a missionary in Asia, together with François Pallu and Ignace Cotolendi. These were sent to the Far East as Apostolic vicars.

On 29 July 1658 Pope Alexander VII appointed him as the first Apostolic Vicar of Cochin and as titular bishop of Beirut. On 11 June 1660 he was consecrated bishop by Victor Le Bouthillier, Archbishop of Tours. The three bishops left France (1660–62) to go to their respective missions, and crossed Persia and India on foot, since Portugal would have refused to take non-Padroado missionaries by ship, and the Dutch and the English refused to take Catholic missionaries.

Bishop Lambert left Marseille on 26 November 1660 accompanied by Fathers De Bourges and Deydier, and reached Mergui in Siam 18 months later. Bishop Pallu joined Bishop Lambert in the capital of Siam, Ayutthaya, after 24 months overland, but Bishop Cotolendi died upon arrival in India on 6 August 1662. Siam thus was the first country to receive the evangelization efforts of the Paris Foreign Missions Society, to be followed by new missions later in Cochinchina, Tonkin and parts of China.

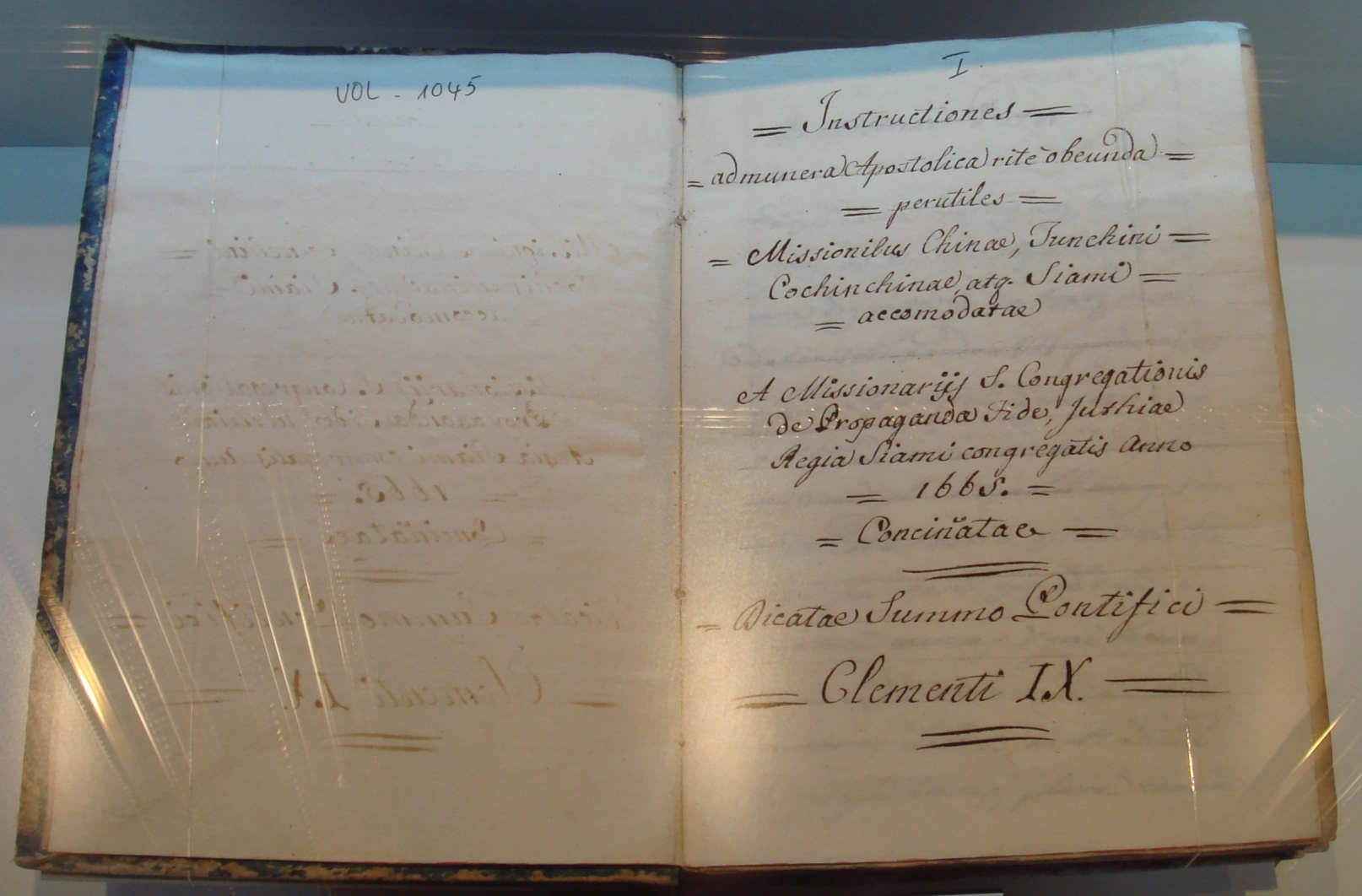
The 1665 "Instructions to Missionaries", based on the instructions of Pope Clement IX, written by Bishop François Pallu and Bishop Pierre Lambert de la Motte.

In 1664, Bishop Lambert together with Bishop Pallu presided a synod in Ayutthaya. They founded in 1665-66 the general seminary in Ayutthaya, Siam (the Seminary of Saint Joseph then Seminary of the Holy Angels, at the origin of the College General now in Penang, Malaysia).

In 1669, Bishop Lambert went to Tonkin together with the secular priests Jacques de Bourges and Gabriel Bouchard to establish a church there, and created the congregation of the Lovers of the Holy Cross (Amantes de la Croix de Jésus-Christ) in 1670.

Bishop Lambert chiefly worked in Siam; he went to Cochinchina in two occasions: from September 1671 to March 1672, and from September 1675 to March 1676.

He died in 1679, in the capital Ayutthaya of Siam.

== See also ==
- France–Thailand relations
