= François Pallu =

French bishop

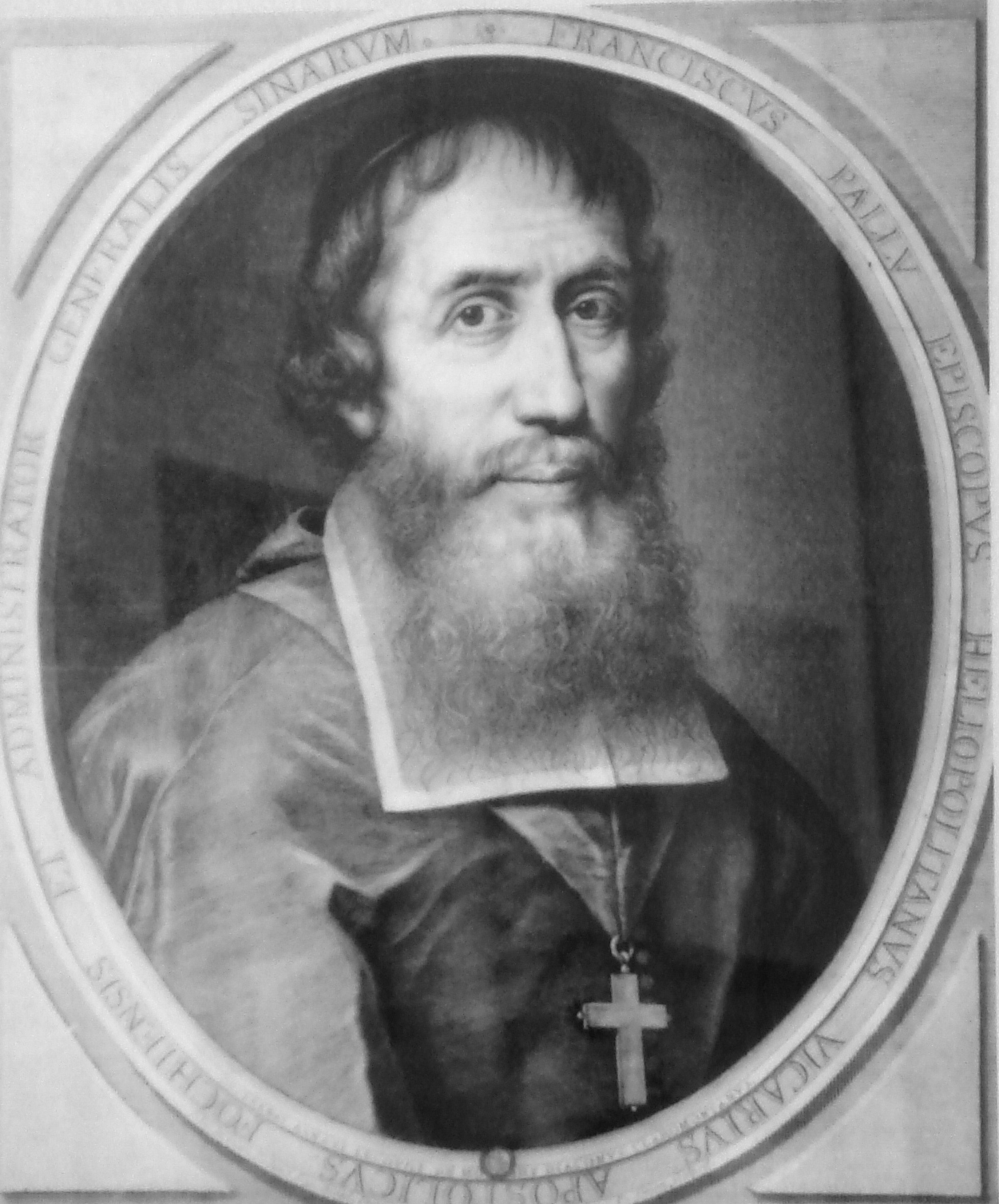
Mgr François Pallu (1626-84).

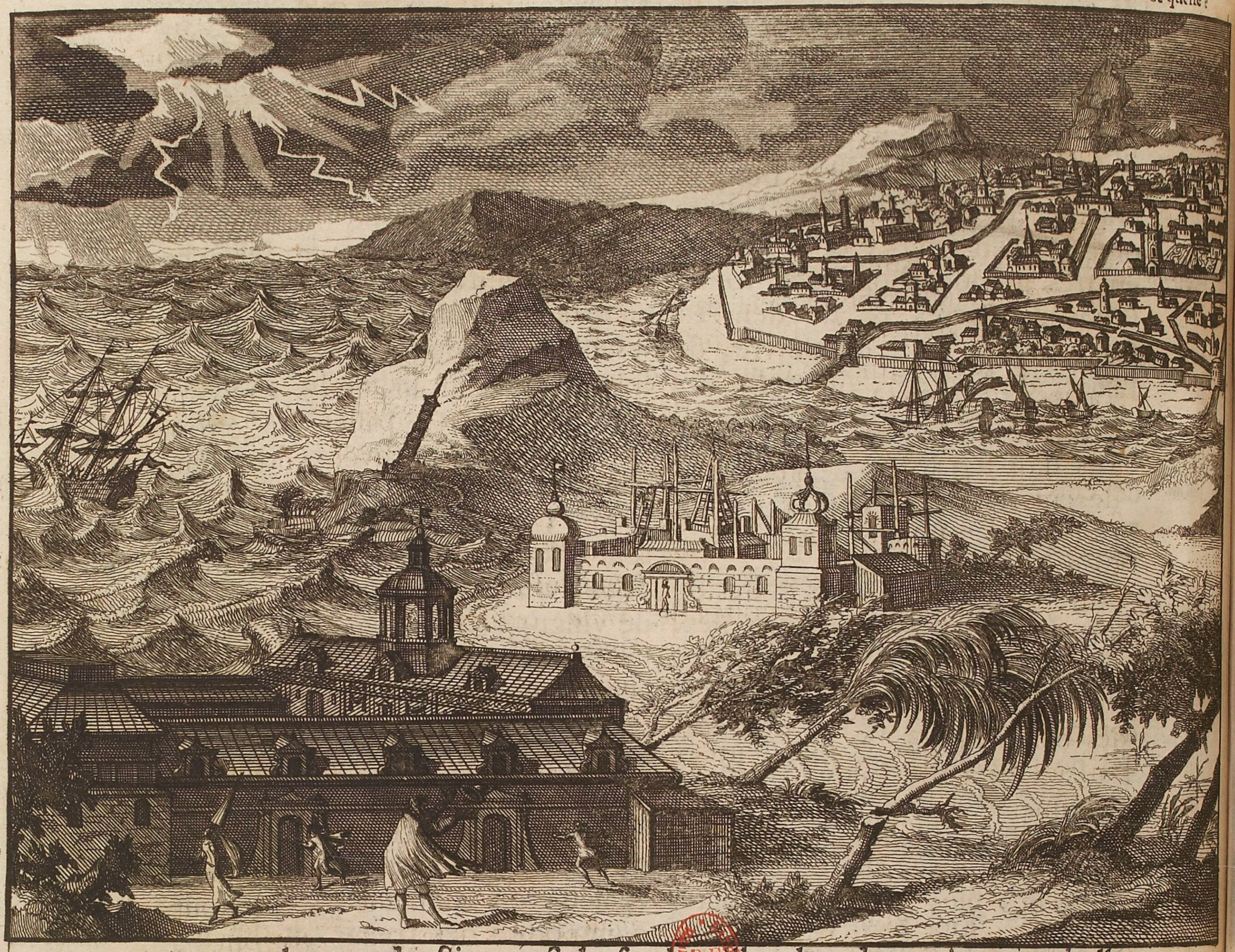
Monseigneur François Pallu founded the Seminary of Saint Joseph in Ayutthaya, Siam, in 1666.

François Pallu, MEP (1626–1684) was a French bishop. He was a founding member of the Paris Foreign Missions Society and became a missionary in Asia.

== Life ==
Born in Tours, now in Indre-et-Loire, Pallu was recruited by Alexander de Rhodes, SJ, as a secular clergy volunteer to become a missionary in Asia, together with Pierre Lambert de la Motte and Ignace Cotolendi. These were sent to the Far East as Apostolic vicars.

In 1658, Pallu became Bishop of Heliopolis, and Vicar apostolic of Tonkin (which consisted of northern Vietnam, Laos and five provinces of southwest China). The three bishops left France (1660–62) to go to their respective missions, and crossed Persia and India on foot, since Portugal would have refused to take non-Padroado missionaries by ship, and the Dutch and the English refused to take Catholic missionaries. Lambert left Marseille on 26 November 1660, and reached Mergui in Siam 18 months later. Pallu, with nine associates, left on 3 January 1662. He joined Lambert in the capital of Siam Ayutthaya after 24 months overland, but Mgr Cotolendi died upon arrival in India on 6 August 1662.

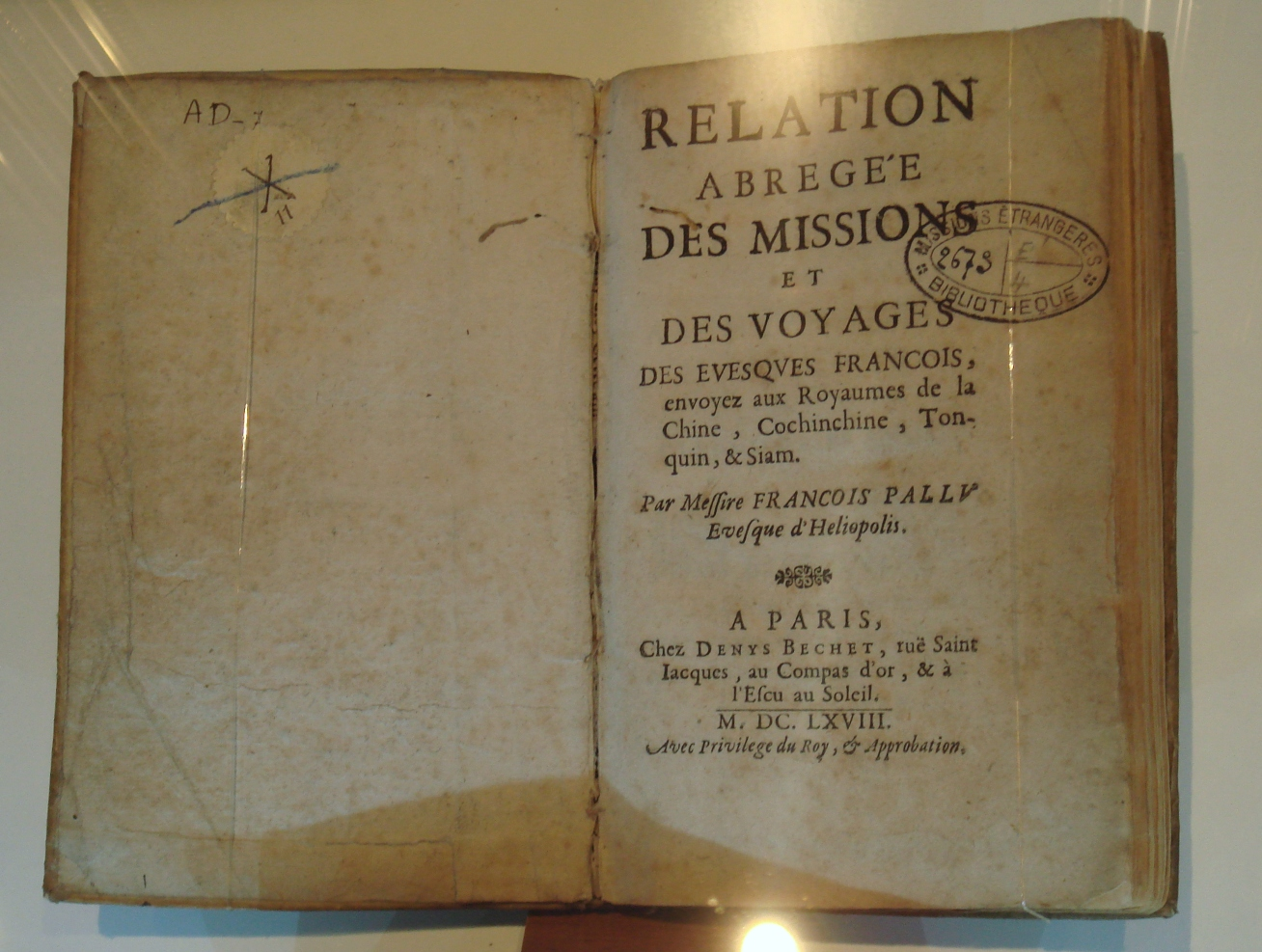
Relation abrégée des missions..., by Mgr Pallu, published in 1668 in Paris.

With Lambert, Pallu founded in 1665-66 the general seminary in Ayutthaya, Siam (the Seminary of Saint Joseph, at the origin of the College General now in Penang, Malaysia).

From 1667 to 1673, Pallu was in France, where he published an account of the French missions in Southeast Asia. He returned to Siam in 1673.

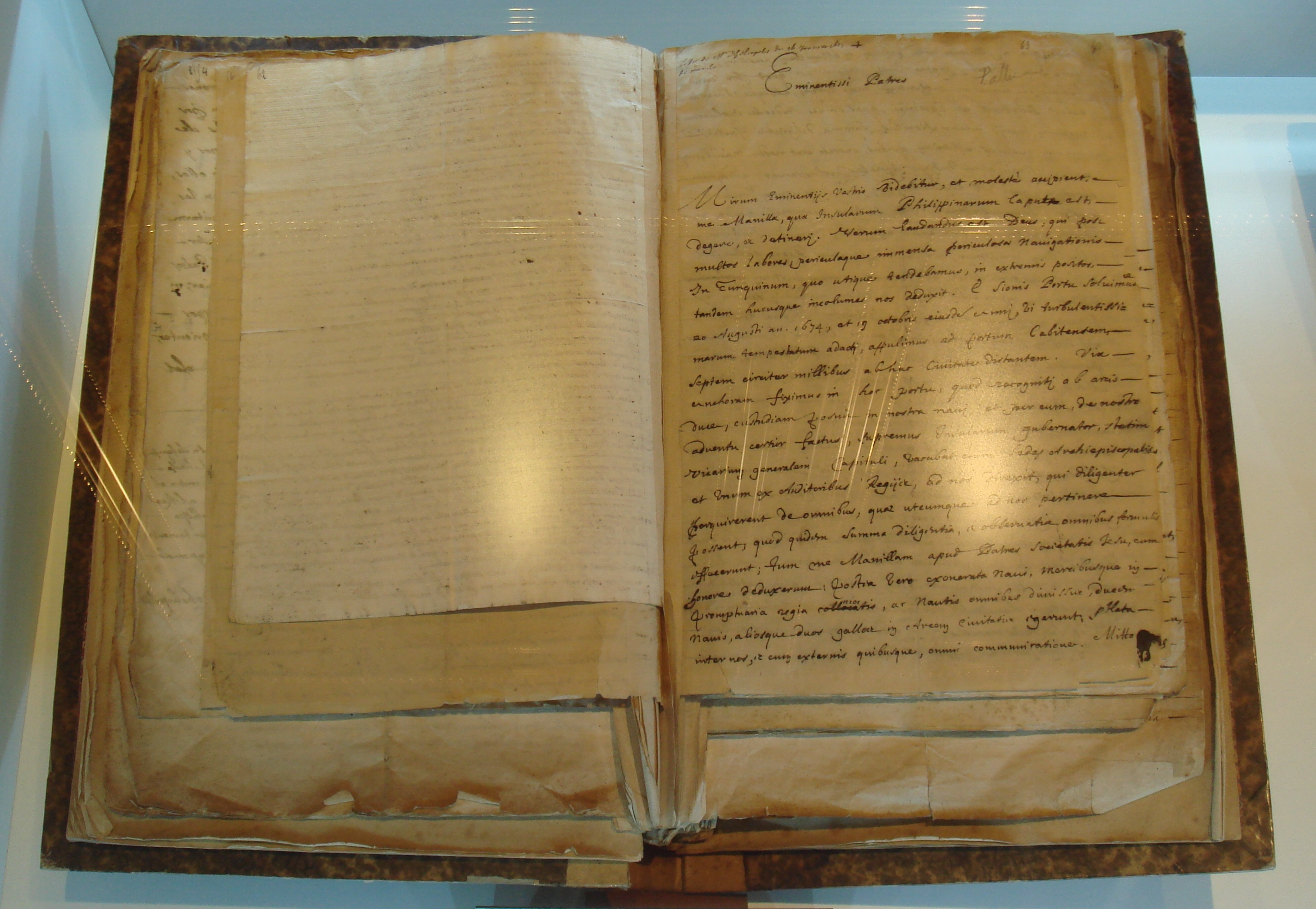
Pallu's 16 January 1675 letter to the Propaganda describing his captivity in Manila

In 1674, Pallu was sailing to his archdiocese in Tonkin, but met with a storm and had to land in Manila. He was imprisoned by the Spanish and put on a ship to Acapulco and from there to Spain to be judged. He was finally freed through the intervention of Pope Innocent XI and Louis XIV. After this involuntary trip around the world, he would only be able to return to Siam in July 1682.

In 1684, Pallu arrived in China, where he was in charge of what is now the Roman Catholic Archdiocese of Fuzhou. He died in the same year in Muyang, Fujian.

== Works ==
- Relation abregée des missions et des voyages des évèques françois (1668)
- Mémoire sur l'état présent des missions et des évèques francais vicaires apostoliques dans la Chine et dans les royaumes de l'Orient (1677).
- Relations des missions et voyages des évèques, vicaires apostoliques, et leurs éclesiastiques (1680).
- État sommaire des missions de la Chine.

== See also ==
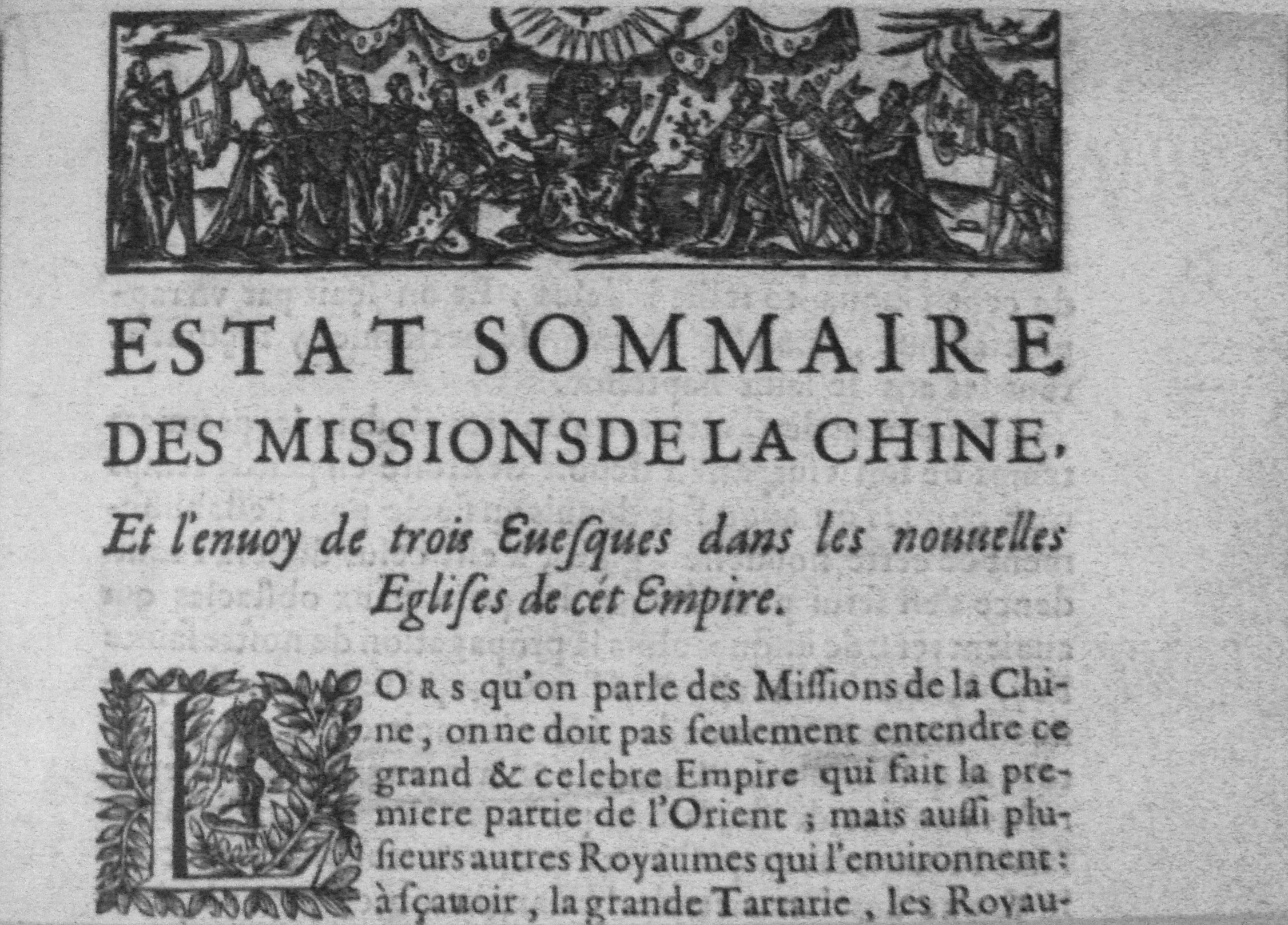
Front page of État sommaire des missions de la Chine, written by Mgr Pallu.

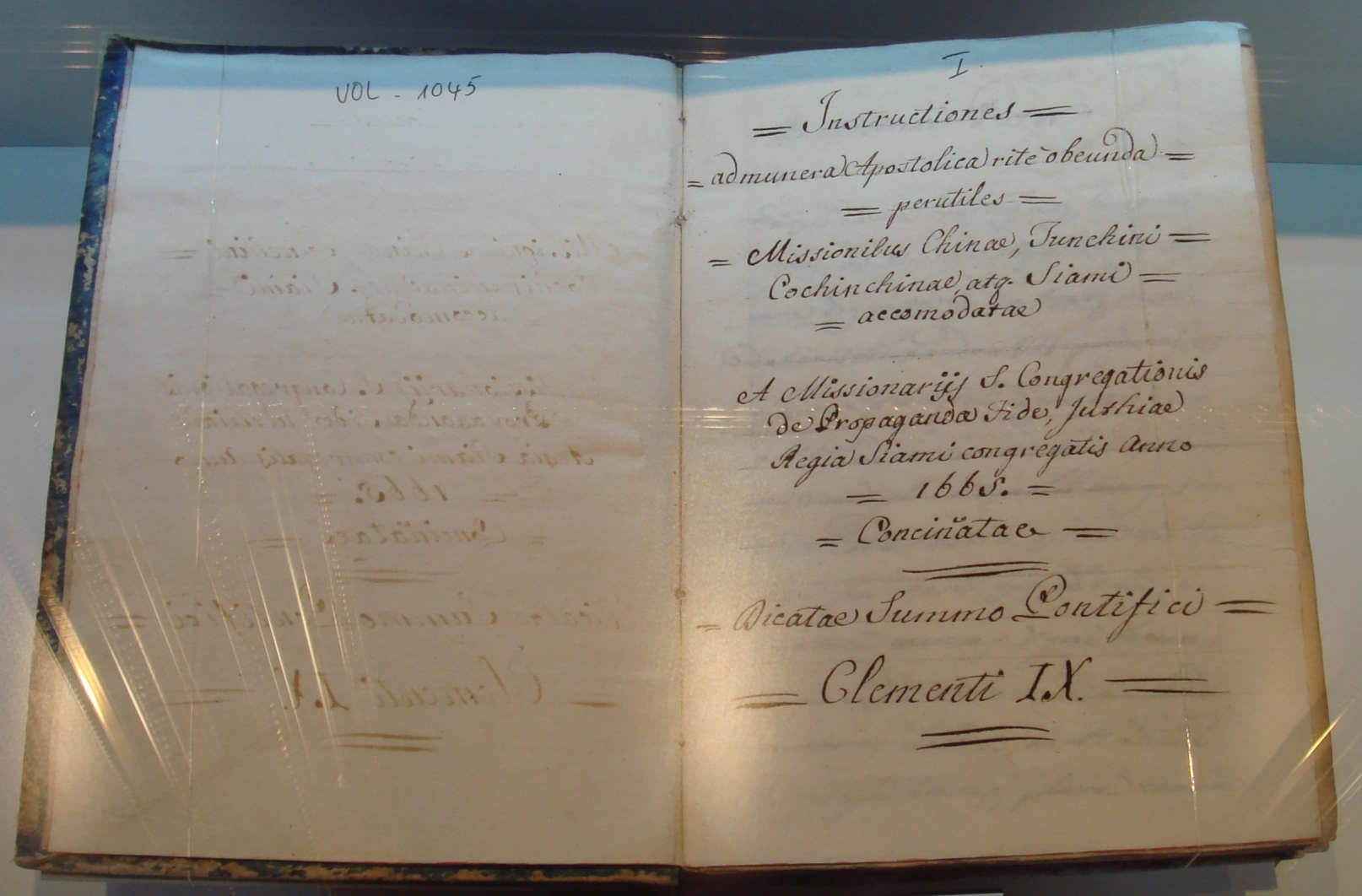
The 1665 "Instructions to Missionaries", based on the instructions of Pope Clement IX, written by François Pallu and Pierre Lambert de la Motte.

- France-Thailand relations
