= Cathedral of the Immaculate Conception (Nanjing) =

Roman Catholic cathedral in Nanjing, China

Coordinates: 32°02′27″N 118°46′42″E

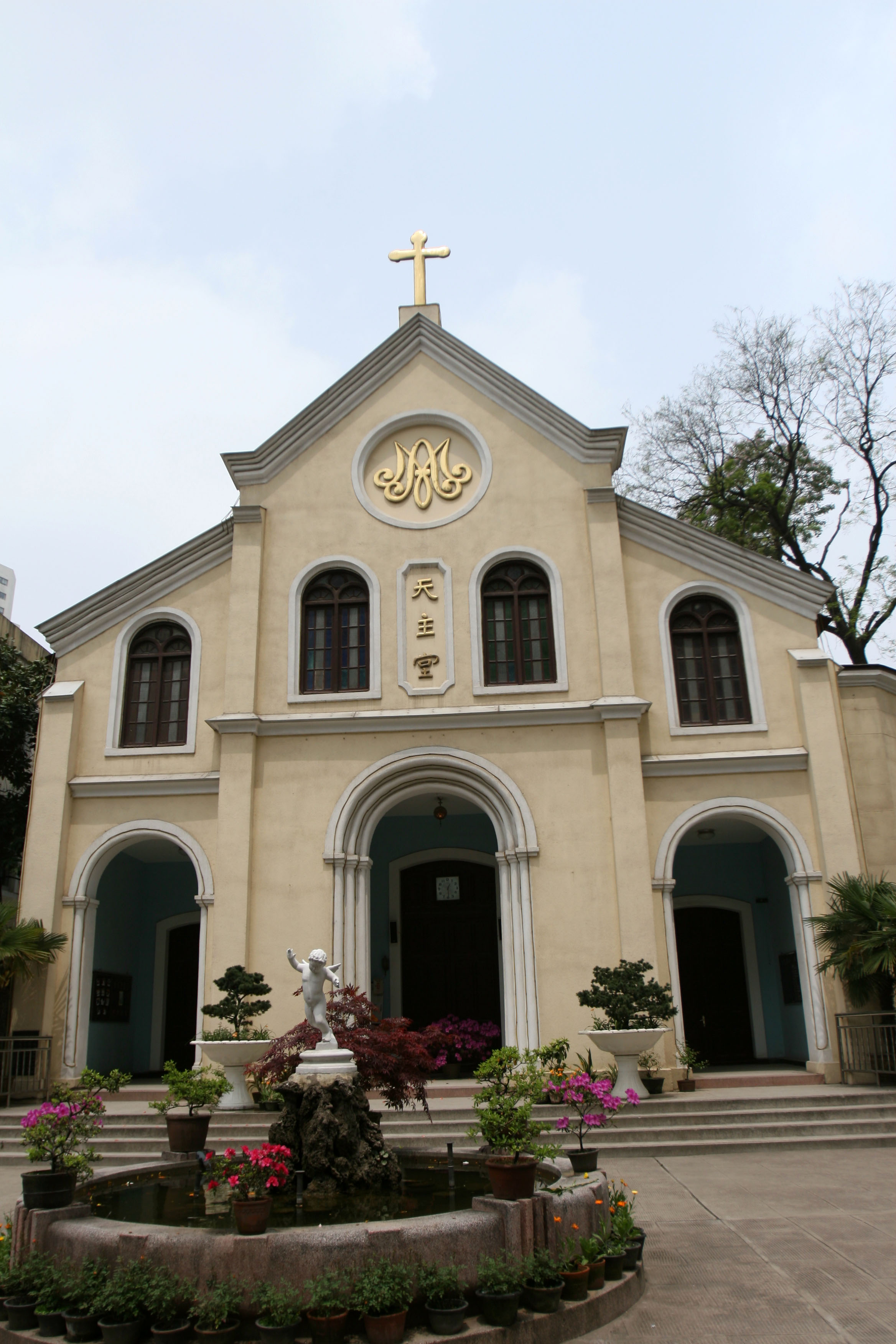
Cathedral of the Immaculate Conception in Nanjing

The Cathedral of the Immaculate Conception (圣母无染原罪始胎堂), commonly known as Shigu Road Cathedral (石鼓路天主教堂) to the locals, is a late 19th-century church in Nanjing that serves as the cathedral of the Roman Catholic Archdiocese of Nanking. It is located in the centre of the city at 112 Shigu Road. First built in 1870 during the Qing dynasty, it was later severely damaged during the Northern Expedition War and had to be rebuilt by the Chinese government in 1928. Since the 1930s it has served as the cathedral for the Archdiocese of Nanjing and is the only Catholic church within the city of Nanjing today. In 1982 it was also listed as a Jiangsu Provincial Historic Site.

== Beginnings ==
The first church in Nanjing was established by the Italian Jesuit and one of the first missionaries to China, Matteo Ricci, in 1599, on one of the three occasions that he came to Nanjing. He bought up a private residence on the west side of the city at a place called Luosi Zhuanwan (罗寺转湾 or later written 螺丝转湾), and with some minor modifications it was soon a centre of religious activities. It was not to last long however, for in 1618 there was an imperial decree banning the practice of Catholicism and the church was torn down.

== Reconstruction ==
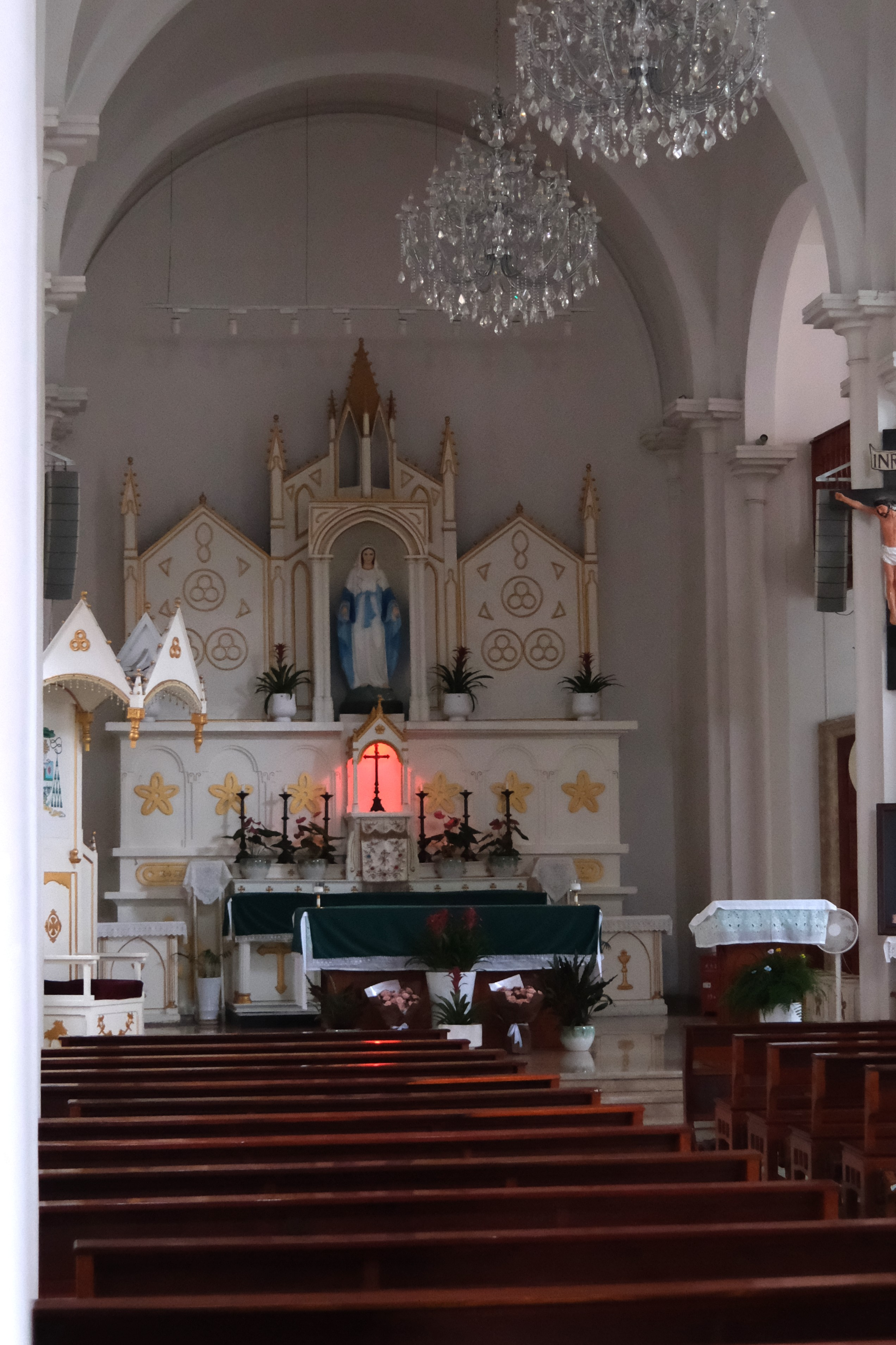
Interior of the cathedral, June 2026

In 1870 a new Romanesque church was built by the French Jesuit Adrien de Carrère on a larger site that included the former site of Ricci's church and also the ruins of an old Buddhist temple. It was consecrated as the Church of Our Lady of the Immaculate Conception. During the Northern Expedition War (1926–1927) it suffered severe damages and was even used as a stables for a period of time. Afterwards, in 1928 it was restored by the National Government and its appearance today is much the same as it was after this last restoration, despite having been somewhat damaged and closed as well during the Cultural Revolution.

== See also ==
- Roman Catholic Marian churches
- Nanjing
- Roman Catholic Archdiocese of Nanking
- Matteo Ricci
- Roman Catholicism in China
- List of Catholic cathedrals in China
- List of Roman Catholic Dioceses in China
- Religion in China
- Christianity in China
