= Paul Yu Pin =

Chinese cardinal of the Catholic Church

His Eminence Paul Yu Pin
- Cardinal, Archbishop of Nanking
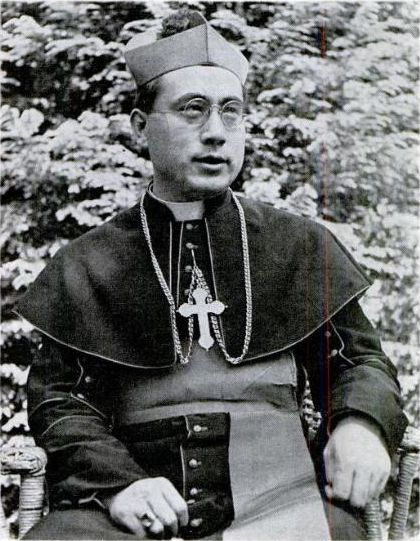
- Province: Nanking
- See: Nanking
- Other post: Cardinal-Priest of Gesù Divin Lavoratore
- Previous posts: Vicar Apostolic of Nanking (1936–1946); Titular Bishop of Sozusa in Palaestina (1936–1946)

Orders
- Ordination: 22 December 1928 by Giuseppe Palica
- Consecration: 20 September 1936 by Mario Zanin
- Created cardinal: 28 April 1969 by Pope Paul VI
- Rank: Cardinal-Priest

Personal details
- Born: April 13, 1901 Shuangmiaozi, Heilongjiang, Qing China
- Died: August 16, 1978 (aged 77) Rome, Italy
- Buried: Fu Jen Catholic University, New Taipei City, Taiwan
- Denomination: Roman Catholic
- Motto: Restaurare omnia in Christo (English: To Restore all things in Christ)
- Coat of arms: Paul Yu Pin's coat of arms

Ordination history of Paul Yu Pin
History
Priestly ordination
- Ordained by: Giuseppe Palica
Episcopal consecration
- Principal consecrator: Mario Zanin
- Co-consecrators: Simon Zhu Kaimin; Paul Léon Cornelius Montaigne
Cardinalate
- Elevated by: Pope Paul VI
Episcopal succession
Bishops consecrated by Paul Yu Pin as principal consecrator
- Philip Silvester Wang Tao-nan: 20 September 1942
- Giuseppe Ferruccio Maurizio Rosà: 22 September 1946
- Matthew Kia Yen-wen: 16 July 1970

Styles of Paul Yú Pin
- Reference style: His Eminence
- Spoken style: Your Eminence
- Informal style: Cardinal
- See: Nanking

Paul Yu Pin (Chinese: 于斌; pinyin: Yú Bīn; 13 April 1901 – 16 August 1978) was a Chinese cardinal of the Catholic Church. He served as Archbishop of Nanking from 1946 until his death, having previously served as its Apostolic Vicar, and was elevated to the cardinalate in 1969.

== Biography ==
=== Early life and education ===
On April 13, 1901, Paul Yu Pin was born to Yu Shuiyuan (于水源) and Xiao Aimei, in Shuangmiaozi (雙廟子, today's Lanxi County), Hulan Subprefecture (呼蘭廳), under the jurisdiction of the Heilongjiang Military Governor in China's northeast (a region not yet established as a formal province at the time). The Yu family traced its ancestral roots to Yujia Village, Changyi County, Laizhou Prefecture, Shandong. In the late Qing dynasty, Yu Pin's great-grandfather, Yu Wencheng, made the journey through Shanhaiguan to settle in Heilongjiang. When Yu Pin was six years old, his father Yu Shuiyuan died, and a year later, when he was seven, his mother, née Xiao, also died. Yu Pin was therefore raised by his paternal grandparents. His grandfather practiced traditional Chinese medicine, and the family lived in modest circumstances. Like other boys in the village, Yu Pin tended the family's pigs, though he did have the opportunity to receive an education at a private village school.

Orphaned at age 7, he was baptized in 1914 after encountering missionary priests near Lansi, where he lived with his grandfather. Yu attended the provincial normal school in Heilongjiang, the Jesuit Aurora University in Shanghai, and the seminary in Jilin.

=== In Rome ===
In 1924, Yu was sent to Rome, where he studied at the Pontifical Urbaniana University (earning his doctorate in theology) and Pontifical Roman Athenaem S. Apollinare. He also studied at the Royal University in Perugia, from where he obtained a doctoral degree in politics.

Yu worked to develop the Catholic Action network across China, working especially closely with Frédéric-Vincent Lebbe.

Yu was ordained to the priesthood on 22 December 1928 by Archbishop Giuseppe Palica, and then taught at the Urbaniana University until 1933, when he returned to China. Upon his return, he was named secretary of the Chinese nunciature, and Inspector General of Catholic schools in China.

In 1933, Rome approved a national Catholic Action Society and appointed Yu as its clerical head. This iteration of Catholic Action included both social organizing and proposals to better situate Catholicism in the Chinese context, including efforts to replace the translation of Catholicism as Tianzhujiao (a term with legal significance under the Unequal Treaties and which therefore had associations with Western imperialism in China) with Gongjiao (which the society hoped would better convey Catholicism's universal aspects, as gong means common or public).

=== Work and life in Nanjing ===
On 17 July 1936, Yu was appointed Apostolic Vicar of Nanking and Titular Bishop of Sozusa in Palaestina by Pope Pius XI. He received his episcopal consecration on the following September 20 from Archbishop Mario Zanin, with Bishops Simon Tchu, SJ, and Paul Montaigne, CM, serving as co-consecrators, in Beijing. In 1937, the Imperial Japanese Army took Nanjing and a reward of $100,000 was placed for the capture of Yu, who spent World War II in the United States.

There he planned in 1943 to establish employment bureaus, available to American teachers, doctors, and technicians, in China. Also that year, the Chinese cleric supported two bills before the House Immigration Committee that allowed Chinese to enter and become citizens of the United States under the quota system. Yu, following his return to China, was promoted to the rank of a Metropolitan Archbishop when his vicariate was elevated as such by Pope Pius XII on 11 April 1946.

=== After the communist revolution ===
In 1949, the People's Republic of China expelled him from his see, and he resumed his exile in the United States. During this time, the Archbishop dedicated himself to helping Chinese Americans and raising funds for refugees from the PRC in Taiwan, where he was made rector magnifico of Fu Jen Catholic University in 1961. He was one of Generalissimo Chiang Kai-shek's closest advisors, and on the brink of McCarthyism, Archbishop Yu Pin made claims against Americans he thought were pro-Communist that turned out not to be true.

Yü attended the Second Vatican Council from 1962 to 1965. During the Council he asked the Pope to address the issue of communism; however the Council did not address communism or socialism.

Communism is a militant atheism and a crude materialism. In a word, it is a compilation of all heresies, and it must be treated as such, if the truth is to be defended. [The Council] must dispel the confusion created by the doctrine of peaceful co-existence, by the policy of the outstretched hand, and by Catholic communism, as it is called, all of which are stratagems calculated to assist communism and to create obscurity, doubt, or at least hesitation in the minds of Christians. In this matter the utmost clarity is now required.

He was created Cardinal Priest of Gesù Divin Lavoratore by Pope Paul VI in the consistory of 28 April 1969. Upon his resignation as Fu Jen's rector on 5 August 1978, he was named its Grand Chancellor. In 1976 he had become the first director of Dharma Realm Buddhist University's Institute for World Religions (now attached to Berkeley Buddhist Monastery).

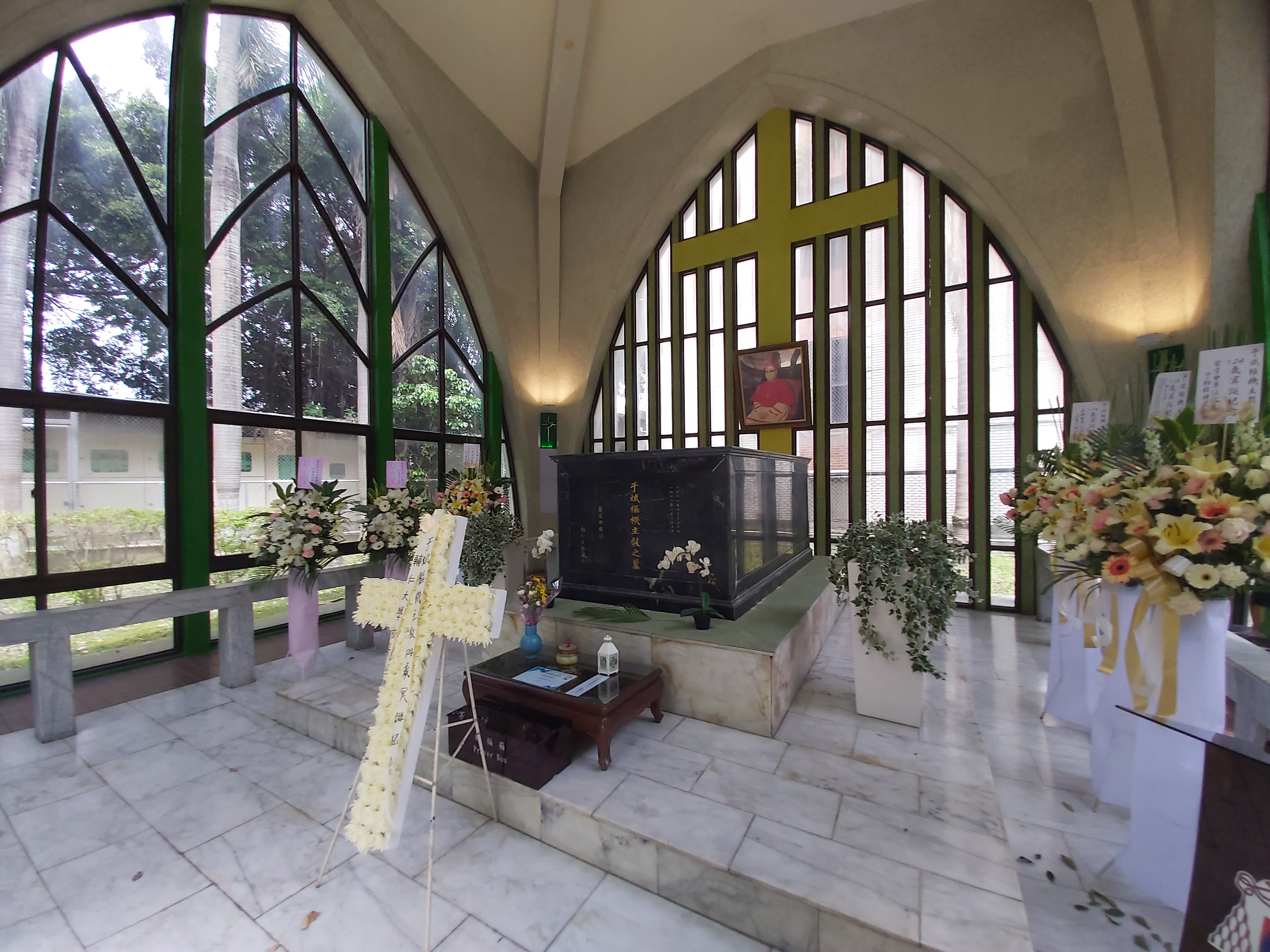
The Mausoleum of Cardinal Yu Pin

He died from a heart attack at age 77 in Rome, where he had gone to participate in the conclave following Pope Paul VI's death in August 1978. Yu is interred in a mausoleum on the campus of Fu Jen Catholic University in Xinzhuang, Taipei County, in Taiwan.

Catholic Church titles
Preceded by Auguste Haouissée	Vicar Apostolic of Nanking; 1936–1946	Elevated to diocese
New diocese	Archbishop of Nanking	Succeeded by Francis Xavier Lu Xinping (de facto only; not recognized by the Holy See)
New creation	Cardinal-Priest of Gesù Divin Lavoratore; 1969–1978	Succeeded by Joseph Bernardin
Preceded by Pierre Cheng	— TITULAR — Bishop of Sozusa in Palaestina; 1936–1946	Succeeded by Antônio de Mendonça Monteiro
Academic offices
Preceded by Chen Yuan (historian)	President of Fu Jen Catholic University; 1960–1978	Succeeded by Stanislaus Lo Kuang
