= Francesco Brancati =

Italian Jesuit missionary (1607–1671)

Francesco Brancati (1607 in Sicily – 1671 in China) was an Italian Jesuit missionary.

== Life ==
He entered the Society of Jesus in 1624 and went to the Chinese Missions in 1637. For nearly thirty years he labored in the province of Kiang-nan, building, it is said, more than ninety churches and forty-five chapels. In 1665, he was exiled from Peking to Canton, where he died (according to Sommervogel, at Shanghai).

== Works ==
He wrote and published numerous books in Chinese, most of which were reprinted by the Jesuit missionaries in the nineteenth century. Among these are a treatise on the Eucharist, instructions on the Decalogue and on the Commandments of the Church, a refutation of divination, and particularly a Catechism, entitled in Chinese 《天神會課》Conversations of the Angels. The Russian Archimandrite Hyacinth (Bichurin), who was the head of the Orthodox mission at Peking, published in the second decade of the nineteenth century an extract of this catechism, adapted to the Greek Rite, in which he omitted everything that disagreed with the Russian Orthodox teaching.

Brancati also composed in Chinese several volumes of sermons and homilies for the Sundays and feast days of the ecclesiastical year. His work on the Chinese rites was published in two volumes at Paris in 1700. It bears the title De Sinensium Ritibus politicis Acta.
