= Motella =

Ancient Roman city in Asia Minor

Coordinates: 38°15′04″N 29°18′26″E

Motella, Metello(u)polis, or Pulcherianopolis was a city in the Roman province of Phrygia Pacatiana, in Asia Minor, probably on the site of the modern Yeşiloba (Medele).

Inscriptions make known a Phrygian town named Motella, which name is connected with the Phrygian feminine proper name Motalis and the Cilician masculine Motales, as also with Mutalli, or Mutallu, the name of an ancient Hittite king of Northern Commagene. One of these inscriptions was found in the village of Medele, which evidently preserves the ancient name.

Motella seems to be the town which Hierocles calls Pulcherianopolis.

== Ecclesiastical history ==
Motella may be supposed to have been raised to the rank of a bishopric by the Empress Pulcheria (414–53). Shortly before 553, perhaps in 535, the Emperor Justinian raised Hierapolis to metropolitan rank, and attached to it a certain number of suffragan sees previously dependent on Laodicea. Among these the Notitiae Episcopatuum mention, from the ninth to the twelfth or thirteenth century, this same Motella, which they call Metellopolis, and even once Metallopolis.

An inscription informs us of Bishop Michael, in 556; and another, of Bishop Cyriacus, perhaps in 667. At the Council of Nicaea in 787, the see was represented by Eudoxius, a priest and monk. Bishop Michael attended the two councils of Constantinople in 869 and 879.

The bishopric of Metellopolis is included in the Catholic Church's list of titular sees. In 1660 Ignace Cotolendi (1630–62) was appointed titular bishop of Metellopolis (Medele) with jurisdiction over three provinces of northeastern China, Tartary, and Korea. The martyred missionary Stephen Theodore Cuenot, who died during the Nguyễn Campaign against Catholicism in the 19th century, was also titular bishop of Metellopolis.
