= Chinese Catholic Patriotic Association =

State-run Chinese Catholic organization

- 中国天主教爱国会
- Classification: Catholic
- Polity: Association
- President: Joseph Li Shan
- Region: Mainland China
- Founder: National Religious Affairs Administration
- Origin: 1957; 69 years ago
- Official website: www.chinacatholic.cn

Chinese Catholic Patriotic Association
- Traditional Chinese: 中國天主教愛國會
- Simplified Chinese: 中国天主教爱国会
Transcriptions
Standard Mandarin
- Hanyu Pinyin: Zhōngguó Tiānzhǔjiào Àiguó Huì
- Wade–Giles: Chūngkuó T'iēnchǔchiào Àikuó Huì
- Yale Romanization: Jūngkwó Tyānzhǔjyào Àigwó Hwèi

The Chinese Catholic Patriotic Association (CCPA) is the national organization for Catholicism in the People's Republic of China. It was established in 1957 after a group of Chinese Catholics met in Beijing with officials from the Chinese Communist Party (CCP) and the Religious Affairs Bureau. It is the main organizational body of Catholics in China officially sanctioned by the Chinese government. The organization is controlled by the United Front Work Department (UFWD) of the Central Committee of the Chinese Communist Party following the State Administration for Religious Affairs' absorption into the UFWD during a series of institutional reforms in 2018.

Since the papacy of John Paul II, the Holy See has pursued reconciliation between the CCPA and underground Catholics who refuse to recognize the organization. According to the Inquirer, the Vatican has been trying "to preserve its communion with China's Patriotic Catholic Church and to protect the faithful who had recently emerged from the underground". The CCPA is in conflict with the Vatican over the appointment of bishops without the approval of the Holy See. At times, both sides reach an agreement - Pope Francis stated that "Chinese Catholics joining the CCPA should not be seen as disloyal to the Vatican" and recognized all bishops appointed by the CCPA and revoked their previous de facto excommunication, and CCPA cancelled a planned ordination of candidates not approved by the Holy See. However, breaches of the agreement occur.

== History ==
After the proclamation of the People's Republic of China in 1949, the Chinese Communist Party sought ways to bring religions in alignment with its ideology. Efforts were made by Chinese Protestants in May 1950 in a meeting with Premier Zhou Enlai. This resulted in the penning of the "Christian Manifesto" that condemned foreign imperialism and argued for building a Chinese Protestant church apart from foreign control. This was based in part on earlier Protestant missiological strategy of creating an indigenous church based on the so-called "three-self principles": self-government, self-support, and self-propagation.

In December 1950, Chinese Catholics followed suit, with Father Wang Liangzuo in north Sichuan province, penning the "Guangyuan Manifesto" and signed by some 500 Catholics. It declared:

We are determined to sever all relations with imperialism, to do all we can to reform ourselves, to establish a new Church that shall be independent in its administration, its resources, and its apostolate.

— "Guangyuan Manifesto" (December 1950)

Other Catholic manifestos followed, such as the "Chongqing Manifesto" published in January 1951 with over 700 signatures. Similar to the Protestant "Christian Manifesto", the Catholic manifestos spoke of the need for a "three-self" or "three-autonomies" (as it was translated into English), even though this was previously only part of the Protestant missiological literature and not discussed among Catholic missionaries. Premier Zhou Enlai met with Chinese Catholics and spoke of his appreciation for the sacrifices of the Catholic Church and its missionaries, and the need to remain united with Rome on spiritual matters. But he also encouraged the development of the "three-self". Pope Pius XII issued Cupimus Imprimis (1952) and Ad Sinarum Gentes (1954) praising Chinese Catholics for their loyalty and underscoring the importance of martyrdom. Ad Sinarum Gentes additionally spoke out against the "three-self", arguing that independence would make a church no longer "Catholic".

In July 1957, 241 Chinese Catholics from all parts of China, including laity, priests, and bishops, convened a meeting in Beijing with officials from the CCP and the Religious Affairs Bureau. They approved the creation of the CCPA with Archbishop Ignatius Pi Shushi of Shenyang elected as president. By early 1958, the first Catholic bishops were illicitly appointed without reference to Rome or the Pope. In June 1958, Pope Pius XII issued Ad Apostolorum Principis, refusing to recognize any consecrations performed without prior Vatican approval. The question of consecrating bishops would be a major sticking point in Sino-Vatican relations ever since.

With the rise of the Anti-Rightist Campaign and the Cultural Revolution, all public religious activities came to an end and organizations like the CCPA were shut down. However, as Deng Xiaoping's reforms enabled a restoration of religions in the 1980s, the CCPA once again became the official state-sanctioned organization for Catholicism in China. A sizable population of Chinese Catholics remain as part of the so-called "underground church", seen as "Vatican loyalists", and who boycott masses said by CCPA priests.

The CCPA does not recognize the proclamation of the dogma of the Assumption of the Blessed Virgin Mary by Pope Pius XII in 1950, canonizations from 1949 onward (e.g. the canonization of Pope Pius X), Vatican declarations on even well-established devotional piety (e.g. on the Sacred Heart of Jesus or on Mary as Queen), and the Second Vatican Council (1962–1965). In practice, however, the Catholic Church in China uses Chinese translations of the documents of the Second Vatican Council, of the 1983 Code of Canon Law, of the 1992 Catechism of the Catholic Church (revised in 1997) and of the 1970 Roman Missal. These had at first to be imported from Taiwan and Hong Kong, but have been printed locally for some years.

In 1980, the CCP Central Committee approved a request by the United Front Work Department to create a national conference for the religious groups. The CCPA was one of five such religious groups, which also included the Islamic Association of China, the Chinese Taoist Association, the Three-Self Patriotic Movement, and the Buddhist Association of China. The Chinese Catholic Bishops Association was created in 1980, as was the Chinese Church Administrative Committee. With some of the CCPA's roles given to these new bodies, it was envisioned that the CCPA would be a connection between church and government, with the Chinese Catholic Bishops' Conference representing the bishops and the Chinese Church Administrative Committee would handle the internal affairs of the church, and in turn by led by the Chinese Catholic Representatives Conference.

In 1981, the CCPA sent a delegation to an international event for the first time, with a group of three bishops, including Michael Fu Tieshan, attending an ecumenical meeting organized by the Canadian Council of Churches.

In 2018, the CCPA's parent organization, the State Administration for Religious Affairs, was absorbed into the United Front Work Department during a series of institutional reforms.

== Appointment of bishops ==
In 1978, Pope Paul VI offered a special faculty that opened up the possibility of bishops in the underground church to appoint new bishops. This was particularly important during a time when the last Vatican-approved bishops occurred in the 1950s, three decades earlier. Peter Joseph Fan Xueyan, the Bishop of Baoding, in 1981 became the first to make use of this special faculty and consecrated three bishops without any prior approval from the Holy See. Pope John Paul II retrospectively gave approval for Fan's actions, and gave further authority to Fan to consecrate more bishops without prior consent. However, given the dire situation of the Catholic Church in China, Pope John Paul II gave permission to five bishops belonging to the underground church and four bishops connected to the CCPA, all of whom were consecrated bishop between 1949 and 1955, the authority to appoint new bishops without prior approval. It was precisely in that period that bishops ordained according to CCPA rules began to request and obtain recognition from the Holy See.

In June 2007, fifty years after the establishment of the CCPA, Pope Benedict XVI made publicly available a letter to the Church in China underscoring the importance of unity and outlining a willingness to engage in "respectful and constructive dialogue" with Chinese bishops and government authorities. Following the letter, five new bishops associated with the CCPA were ordained in 2007, all with papal and Chinese government approval.

In September 2018, a provisional agreement was signed between the Vatican and the Chinese government that stipulated that China would recommend bishops for papal approval and that the pope had the ability to veto any recommendations. Pope Francis also recognized seven bishops of the CCPA who were previously not in communion with the Vatican. Some have raised concerns that the agreement would divide Catholics across China because it offers more control to the Chinese government. Among the most outspoken critics has been the Hong Kong cardinal Joseph Zen, who published an opinion piece in The New York Times entitled "The Pope Doesn't Understand China", and asserting that this attempt at unifying the Chinese church will instead lead to the "annihilation of the real Church in China". While the agreement has generally been recognized as far from perfect, it is also seen by Pope Francis as a step towards healing and the task of evangelization.

In October 2022, the agreement was renewed for another two years. In November 2022, the Vatican accused the Chinese government of violating the terms of the agreement.

In April 2025, the Diocese of Xinxiang elected Fr. Li Janlin as bishop during the sede vacante period following the death of Pope Francis but before the election of a new pope, making it impossible for the Holy See to recognize or ratify the appointment.

== Theology ==
Since its creation, the CCPA has put Chinese patriotism and the Catholic duty to fulfill one's duty to the central government at the front of its theology. It also stresses its anti-imperialism and the need to mark a drastic change from the previous associations of the Catholic Church in China with colonialism and imperialism. In the Guangyuan manifesto, the church stated: "We won't let the Church be tainted by imperialism." The CCPA uses messaging such as "Jesus was himself a labourer" to argue that Chinese Catholics should make a stand as fellow labourers and willingly contribute to the good of the Chinese socialist state. The CCPA argues that there is an ideological harmony between socialism and Catholicism, and attributes socialist values to Pope Francis and other progressive clergymen.

The CCPA also pursues the policy of Sinicization, which is meant to reinforce the Chinese national identity and adapt the Catholic liturgy and sacred art to the traditional Chinese culture. Additionally, the Catholic teaching is interpreted in accordance with the Communist doctrine and in agreement with the ideology of the Chinese Communist Party. A bishop in the CCPA, Joseph Shen Bin, remarked that Chinese Catholic theology uses "core socialist values as guidance to provide a creative interpretation of theological classics and religious doctrines that aligns with the requirements of contemporary China's development and progress, as well as with China's splendid traditional culture".

The Vatican became increasingly conciliatory towards the Chinese government since Pope John XXIII and his Vatican II reform, allowing it to influence the teachings and stance of the CCPA. Initial efforts to reconcile with the CCPA were stalled by the Cultural Revolution, but contact was eventually established after Deng Xiaoping came to power, and further reconciliation took place under the papacies of John Paul II and Francis. Despite his conservative reputation, Pope John Paul II approved of the theologic message of the CCPA, stating: "A genuine and faithful Christian is also a genuine and good citizen. A good Chinese Catholic works loyally for the progress of the nation, observes the obligations of filial piety towards parents, family and country."

In 2018, the Holy See released a statement further clarifying its stance towards the CCPA:

[T]he Holy See does not intend to force anyone's conscience. On the other hand, it considers that the experience of clandestinity is not a normal feature of the Church's life and that history has shown that Pastors and faithful have recourse to it only amid suffering, in the desire to maintain the integrity of their faith. Thus, the Holy See continues to ask that the civil registration of the clergy take place in a manner that guarantees respect for the conscience and the profound Catholic convictions of the persons involved.

This statement resulted in some underground Catholic underground bishops stepping down from their posts and recognizing the CCPA authority, and Chinese Catholics who join the CCPA are not considered disloyal to the Vatican.

The CCPA was strongly supportive of Pope Francis, considering his theology to be very similar with the goals of the CCP - the CCPA emphasized Pope Francis' support for the poor and condemnation of the free market economy. Liberation theology, which considers fascism and capitalism immoral, unlawful and evil and a means to oppress the poor, weak, sick and needy is also promoted, with Pope Francis' chapter "The limits of capitalism", in which he equated capitalism with the promotion of selfish and unjust behavior, seen as an endorsement of liberation theology. The CCPA also argues that Pope Francis sought to free the Vatican from "materialism and elitism", highlighting the Pope's withdrawals of numerous honorary degrees and his criticism of using the social hierarchy of the Church for financial gain.

The religious message of Pope Francis has also been described by some as being connected to the Marxist notion of class struggle, while McQuillan and Park, writing on Pope Francis and his connection to Chinese Catholic theology, conclude: "Pope Francis calls for an expanded role for government redistribution in efforts to alleviate poverty [but in doing so, he] also makes an unrelenting attack on capitalism." The CCPA promoted messages that depict Pope Francis as communist or communist-oriented, with some in the CCPA arguing that Pope Francis was an example of a "good communist".

Some within the official Catholic Church also praise the CCPA and reflect its message. A Chinese priest of the official Church remarked that "the Ten Commandments and the core socialist values are the same". He stated:

In the everyday experience of a Catholic, the Ten Commandments and the core socialist values are the same. All Christians have the same values: to love the motherland, to love the people, to promote unity, to be unified with the masses, to promote a harmonious society, even to be unified with people with different worldviews and to be united to and protect people who oppose us.

Marcelo Sánchez Sorondo, the former chancellor of the Vatican's Academy of Social Sciences, contends that the economic policies of the People's Republic of China best represent the Catholic social teaching:

Right now, those who are best implementing the social doctrine of the Church are the Chinese. They seek the common good, subordinating things to the general good … The dignity of the person is defended … Liberal thought has liquidated the concept of the common good, not even wanting to take it into account, asserting that it is an empty idea, without any interest. By contrast, the Chinese focus on work and the common good.

== See also ==
- Religion in China
- Christianity in China
- Korean Catholic Association
