= John Wong =

John Wong may refer to:

- John Wong Pan-yang (1910–?), Chinese-American aviator who served in the Chinese Air Force
- John Huang Xinrui or John Wong Sun-shui (1914–1941), Chinese-American aviator who served in the Chinese Air Force
- John Wong Soo Kau (born 1968), Malaysian Roman Catholic bishop
- John Wong (Neighbours), fictional character from the Australian soap opera Neighbours
- Jonathan Wong (born 1986), American-born Hong Kong singer and actor

== See also ==
- John Wang (disambiguation)
