= Sacred Heart Cathedral (Xuzhou) =

- 徐州耶稣圣心主教座堂
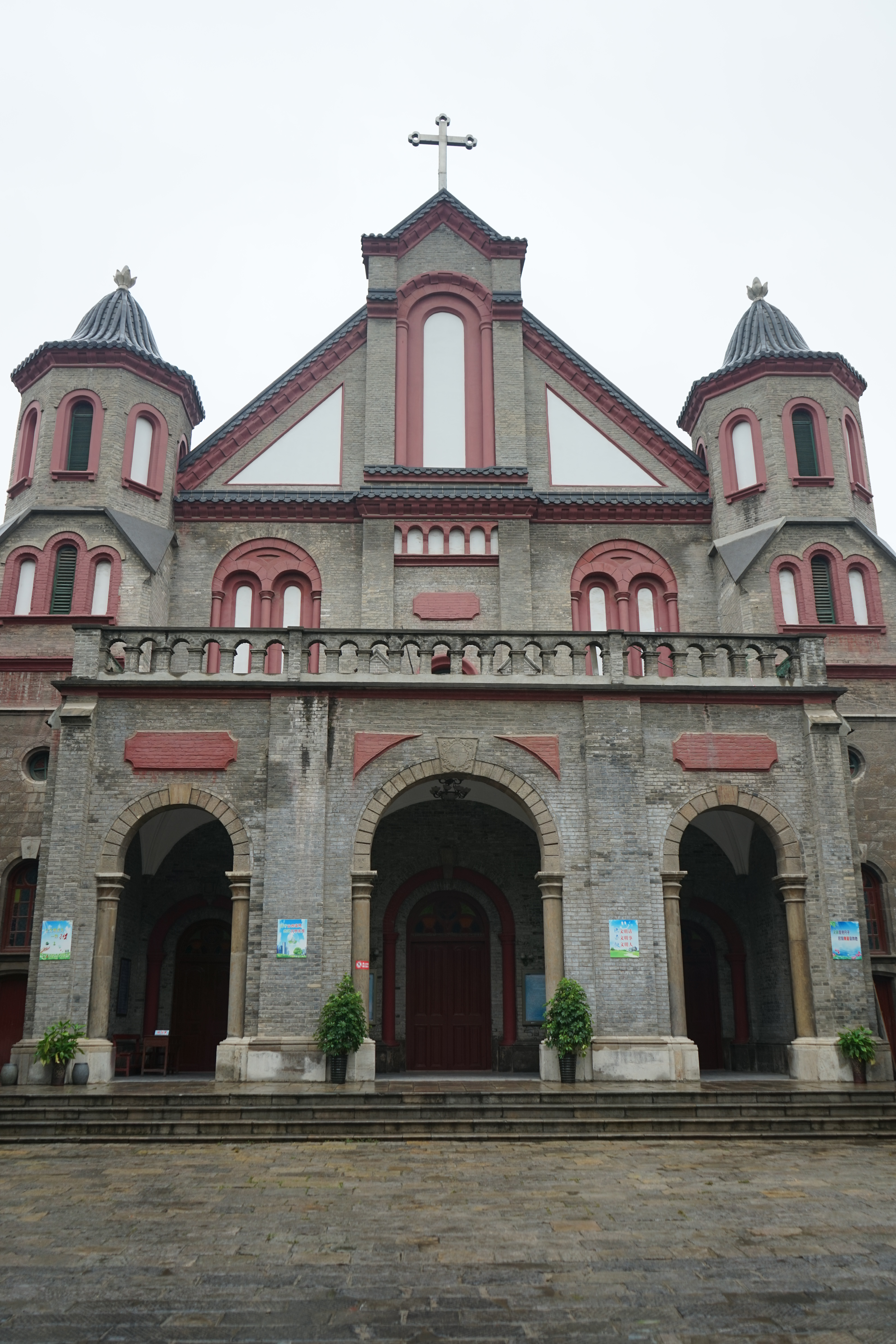
- Sacred Heart Cathedral, Xuzhou

- Location in Jiangsu Sacred Heart Cathedral (China)
- 34.266574°N 117.199261°E
- Location: Xuzhou, Jiangsu
- Country: China
- Denomination: Roman Catholic

History
- Status: Parish church
- Founded: November 2010

Architecture
- Functional status: Active
- Architectural type: Church building
- Years built: 1910

Specifications
- Height: 25 metres (82 ft)
- Materials: Bricks

Administration
- Province: Jiangsu
- Diocese: Xuzhou

The Sacred Heart Cathedral (simplified Chinese: 徐州耶稣圣心主教座堂; traditional Chinese: 徐州耶穌聖心主教座堂) also known as the Cathedral of the Sacred Heart of Jesus, is a Roman Catholic cathedral in Xuzhou, China. It is the seat of the Roman Catholic Diocese of Xuzhou. The cathedral is located at 216 Youth Road.

== History ==
Construction of the Sacred Heart Cathedral, designed by German Catholic clergyman Joseph Wu, commenced in 1908 and was completed in 1910.

In November 1987, it has been categorized as a municipal level cultural unit by the Xuzhou Municipal Government. It was renovated and refurbished in 1992. In April 1995, it has been designated as a provincial level cultural heritage conservation unit by the Jiangsu Provincial Government.
