= John Wang =

John Wang or John Baptist Wang may refer to:

== Roman Catholic bishops ==
- John Baptist Wang Jin (1924–2014), Chinese Roman Catholic bishop in Shanxi
- John Wang Ruowang (born 1962), Chinese Roman Catholic bishop in Gansu
- John Baptist Wang Xiaoxun (born 1966), Chinese Roman Catholic bishop in Shaanxi
- John Wang Renlei (born 1970), Chinese Roman Catholic bishop in Xuzhou

== Other people ==
- John Wang (politician) (born 1962), Taiwanese politician
- Wang Lung-wei (born 1947), also known as Johnny Wang, Chinese actor
