= Xuzhou =

Xuzhou 徐州市 Hsü-chou, Süchow
- Prefecture-level city
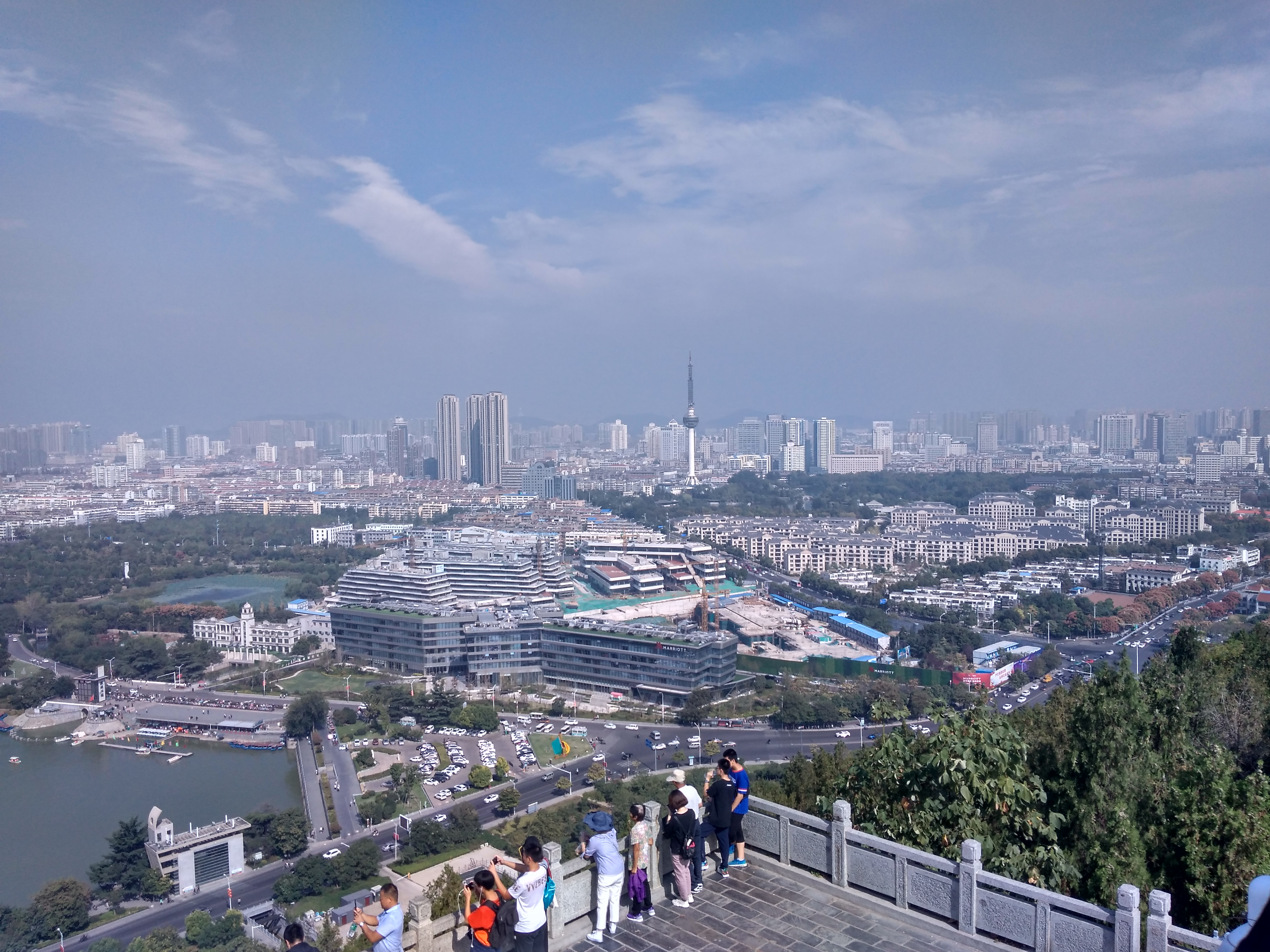
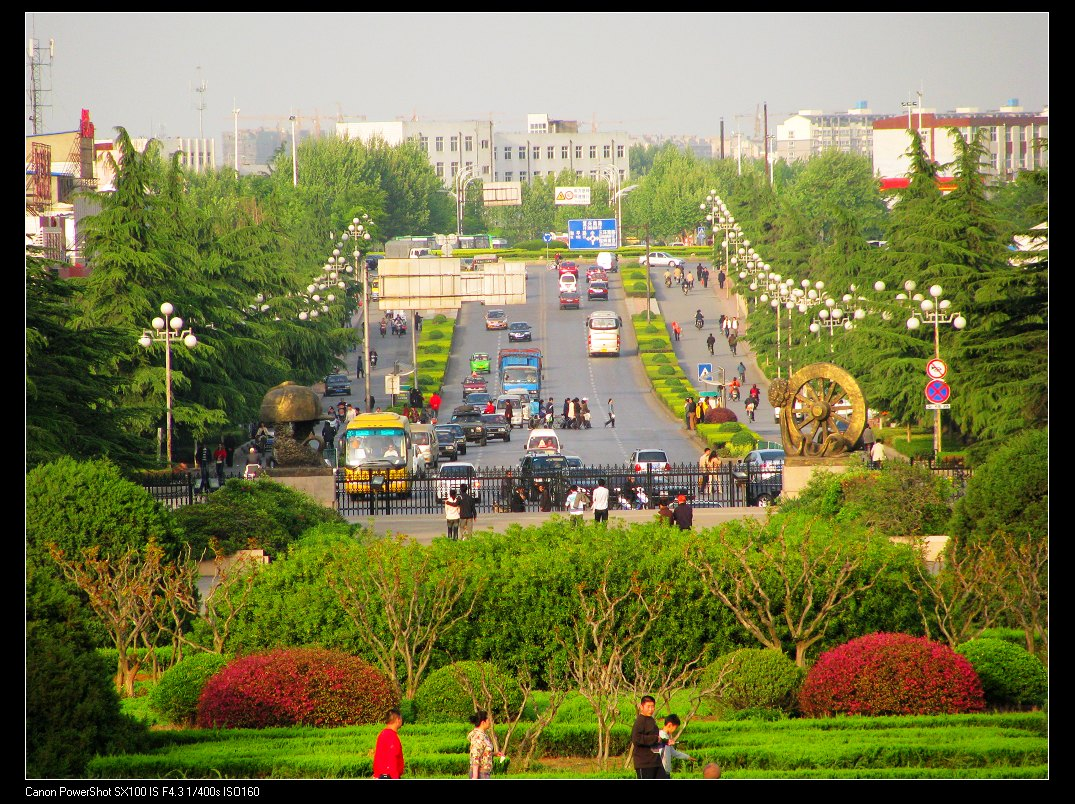
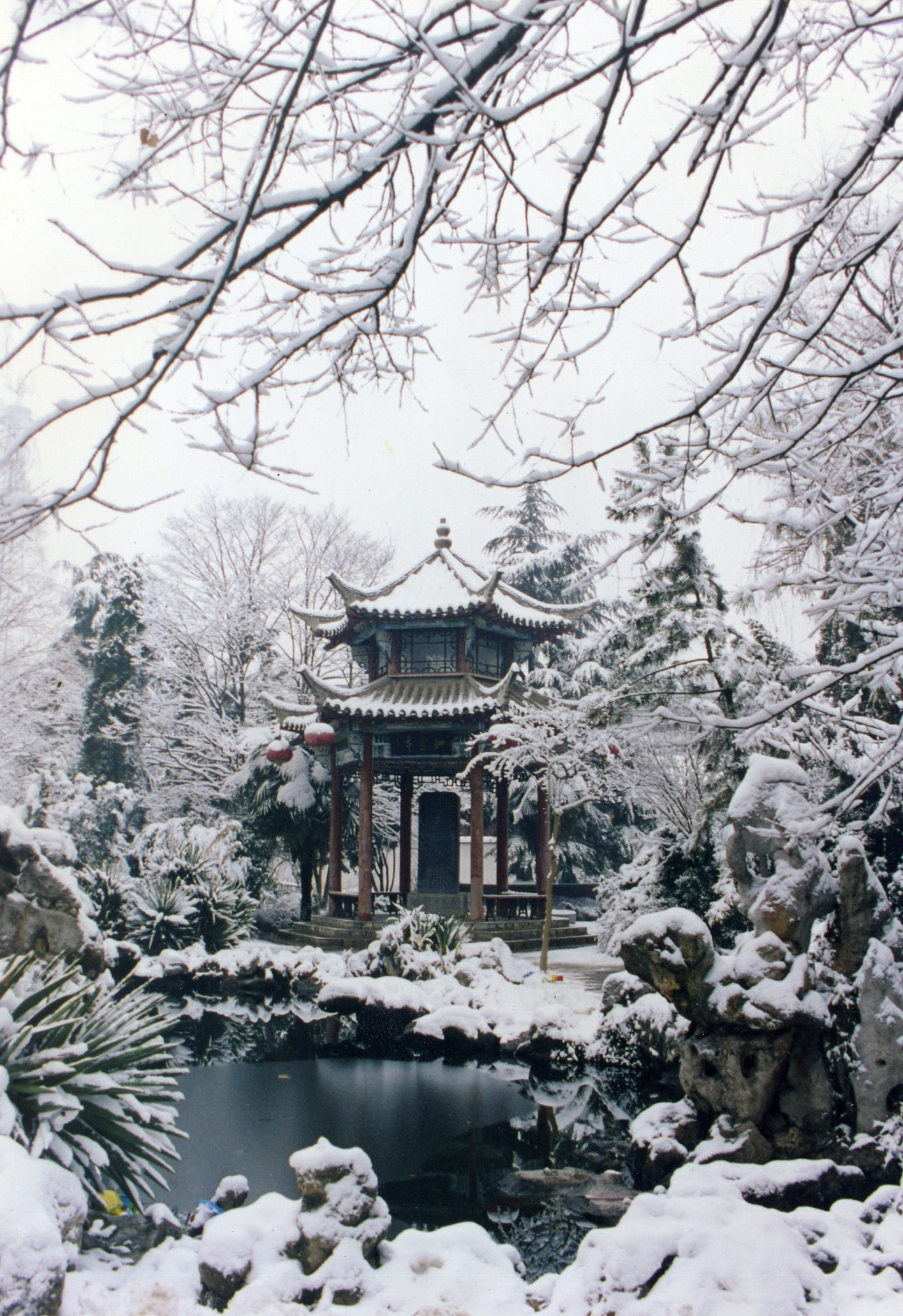
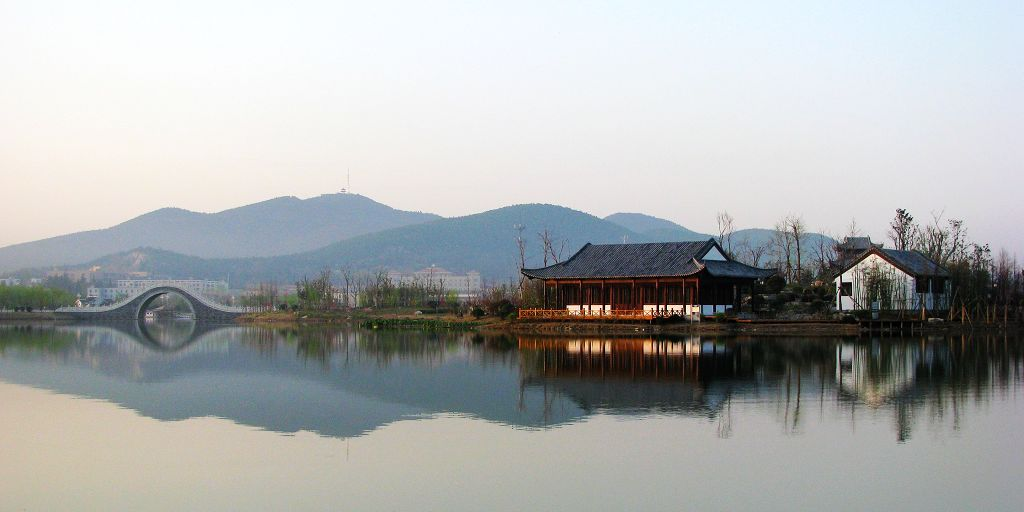
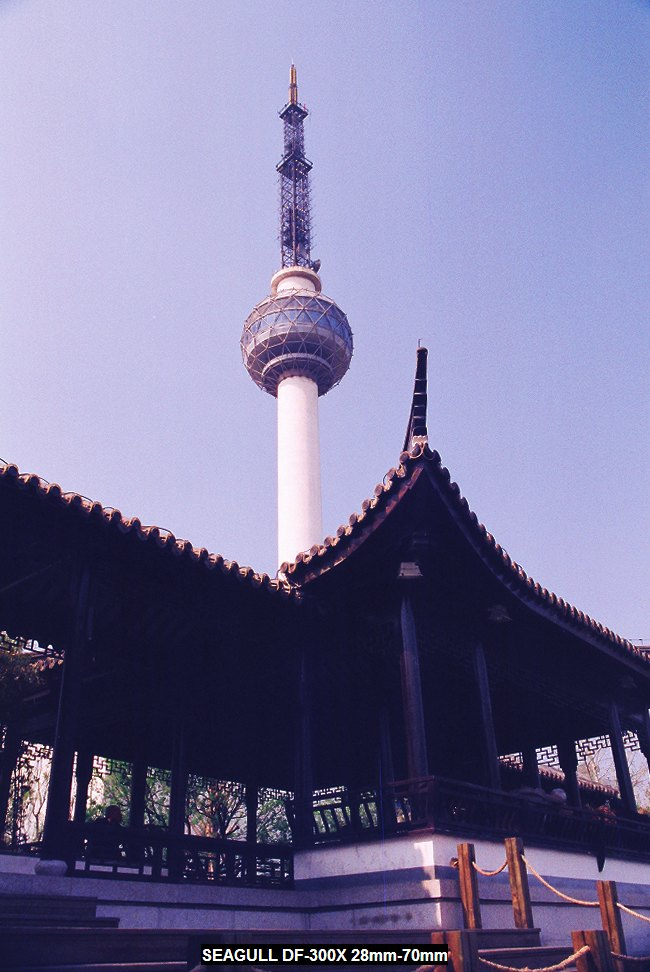
- Left to right, top to bottom: Xuzhou skyline, Huaihai campaign Memorial Park, Surabaya Pavilion in Sishuiting Park, Yunlong Lake, the Xuzhou TV Tower

- Location of Xuzhou City jurisdiction in Jiangsu

- Location of the city center in Jiangsu Xuzhou (Eastern China) Xuzhou (China)
- Coordinates (Pengcheng Square): 34°15′54″N 117°11′13″E
- Country: People's Republic of China
- Province: Jiangsu
- County-level divisions: 10
- Township-level divisions: 161
- Municipal seat: Yunlong District

Government
  - Mayor: Shen Junfeng (沈峻峰)
  - CPC Committee Secretary: Song Lewei (宋乐伟)

Area
  - Prefecture-level city: 11,259 km^{2} (4,347 sq mi)
  - Urban: 3,037 km^{2} (1,173 sq mi)
  - Metro: 2,347 km^{2} (906 sq mi)

Population (2020 census)
  - Prefecture-level city: 9,083,790
  - Density: 806.80/km^{2} (2,089.6/sq mi)
  - Urban: 3,589,215
  - Urban density: 1,182/km^{2} (3,061/sq mi)
  - Metro: 3,135,660
  - Metro density: 1,336/km^{2} (3,460/sq mi)

GDP (2025)
  - Prefecture-level city: CN¥ 995.722 billion US$ 145.82 billion
  - Per capita: CN¥ 104,990; US$ 14,742
- Time zone: UTC+8 (China Standard)
- Postal codes: 221000 (Urban center), 221000, 221000, 221000 (Other areas)
- Area code: 0516
- ISO 3166 code: CN-JS-03
- Major Nationalities: Han
- Licence plate prefixes: 苏C

Xuzhou
- "Xuzhou" in Chinese characters
- Chinese: 徐州
- Postal: Suchow
Transcriptions
Standard Mandarin
- Hanyu Pinyin: Xúzhōu
- Wade–Giles: Hsü^{2}-chou^{1}
- IPA: [ɕy̌.ʈʂóʊ]

Pengcheng
- Chinese: 彭城
Transcriptions
Standard Mandarin
- Hanyu Pinyin: Péngchéng

Xuzhou (Chinese: 徐州), also known as Pengcheng (彭城), is a prefecture-level city in northwestern Jiangsu province, China. Located at the junction of four provinces—Jiangsu, Shandong, Henan, and Anhui—it occupies a natural geographic gap between the Shandong Hills and the North China Plain. As of the 2020 census, it had a population of approximately 9.08 million.

Xuzhou is a designated important node city of Belt and Road Initiative, a provincial sub-center of Jiangsu, and the central city of the Huaihai Economic Zone. As a major national transport hub, it serves as the strategic intersection of the north–south Beijing–Shanghai axis and the east–west Land Bridge corridor.

The city is the ancestral home of the Han dynasty imperial family, and its history is defined by its rich Han archaeological heritage. Formerly a regional coal-mining base, Xuzhou has transitioned into a center for heavy machinery manufacturing and new energy industries, and was awarded the United Nations Habitat Scroll of Honour award for its ecological restoration of mining areas.

== Romanization ==
Before the official adoption of Hanyu Pinyin, the city's name was typically romanized as Suchow or Süchow, though it also appeared as Siu Tcheou [Fou], Hsu-chou, Hsuchow, and Hsü-chow.

== History ==
=== Early history ===
Archaeological remains in the Xuzhou region are largely associated with Dawenkou culture, while the Huating site indicates an early integration of Dawenkou and Liangzhu cultural elements.

In the Shang dynasty, Dapeng ("Great Peng") or Peng, associated with the Dongyi, was a dominant polity in the region. Archaeological evidence from the Qiuwan (丘灣) site shows both Shang-style ritual remains and indigenous pottery, reflecting cultural integration between Shang and local traditions. Following King Wu Ding's military campaigns, Dapeng was eventually subordinated to Shang authority.

During the Western Zhou period, the Xu people migrated south from Shandong to the Xuzhou region to establish a polity. Their territory once encompassed the lower reaches of the Huo River (an ancient tributary of the Si River), a corridor connecting the Central Plains with the southeast. The region was eventually annexed by the State of Song, which dominated the river's upper reaches.

Pengcheng, named after the Dapeng, first appears in records in 573 BCE as a Song fortified city at the confluence of the ancient Bian and Si rivers. Contested during the Chu–Jin rivalry, the city was briefly occupied by the official Yu Shi with Chu support before being recovered by a Jin-led coalition.

Around the 4th century BCE, Song had reportedly moved its capital to Pengcheng; in 385 BCE Duke Dao of Song was captured there by the State of Wei. Following Song's annexation by Qi in 286 BCE, Pengcheng served as a frontier stronghold. It later fell to Chu and was incorporated into the Qin Empire in 223 BCE.

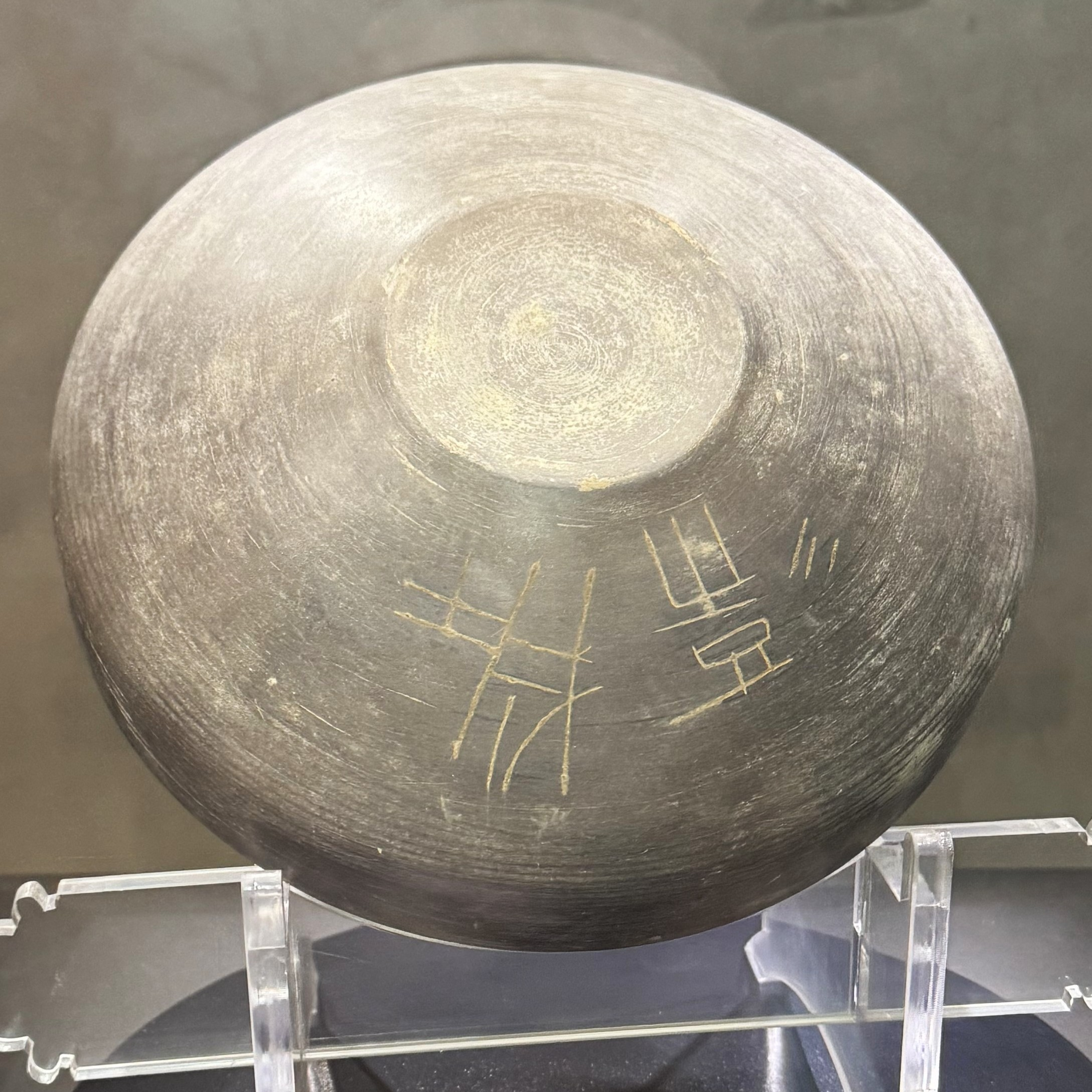
Pottery bowl with "Pengcheng" inscription, Warring States period, unearthed in downtown

=== Imperial China ===
==== Qin and Han dynasties ====
Following Qin unification, the region was organized as Sichuan (四川) commandery. (Note: Although traditionally recorded as Sishui commandery (Chinese: 泗水郡) in the Book of Han and subsequent histories, archaeological evidence from Qin-era bamboo slips and excavated official seals confirms the original name was Sichuan, referring to the four major rivers in the region: Si, Bian, Qi and Ji. The name was likely corrupted to "Sishui" by later Han chroniclers.) During the Qin collapse, Pengcheng became a locus for Chu cultural revival: it was where Emperor Yi of Chu moved his seat in 208 BCE, and it was where Xiang Yu established the capital of Western Chu in 206 BCE, designating the area as his capital. Despite Xiang Yu's victory at the Battle of Pengcheng (205 BCE), the city passed to Han control.

In 202 BCE, it became the capital of the Chu Princedom under Liu Jiao. In 154 BCE, Prince Liu Wu joined the Rebellion of the Seven Princes. Despite his defeat and subsequent territorial reductions, his Shizishan (獅子山) tomb exceeded standard sumptuary limits and contained gold-threaded jade burial suits.

Following Prince Liu Yanshou's failed conspiracy in 69 BCE, the princedom was briefly abolished but restored in 51 BCE. During the Eastern Han, it alternated between a princedom and commandery under various princes, including Liu Ying and Liu Qing. During this period, Pengcheng emerged as one of the earliest recorded sites of a Buddhist community in China.

In the 190s, Cao Cao's campaigns against Tao Qian damaged Pengcheng, forcing a Buddhist community of ten thousand—led by figures such as Ze Rong—to flee toward the Yangtze valley. After Lü Bu's defeat in 198 CE, the seat of Xu Province moved from Tancheng to Xiapi, and was finally fixed at Pengcheng under the Western Jin, making the city the administrative center of the province.

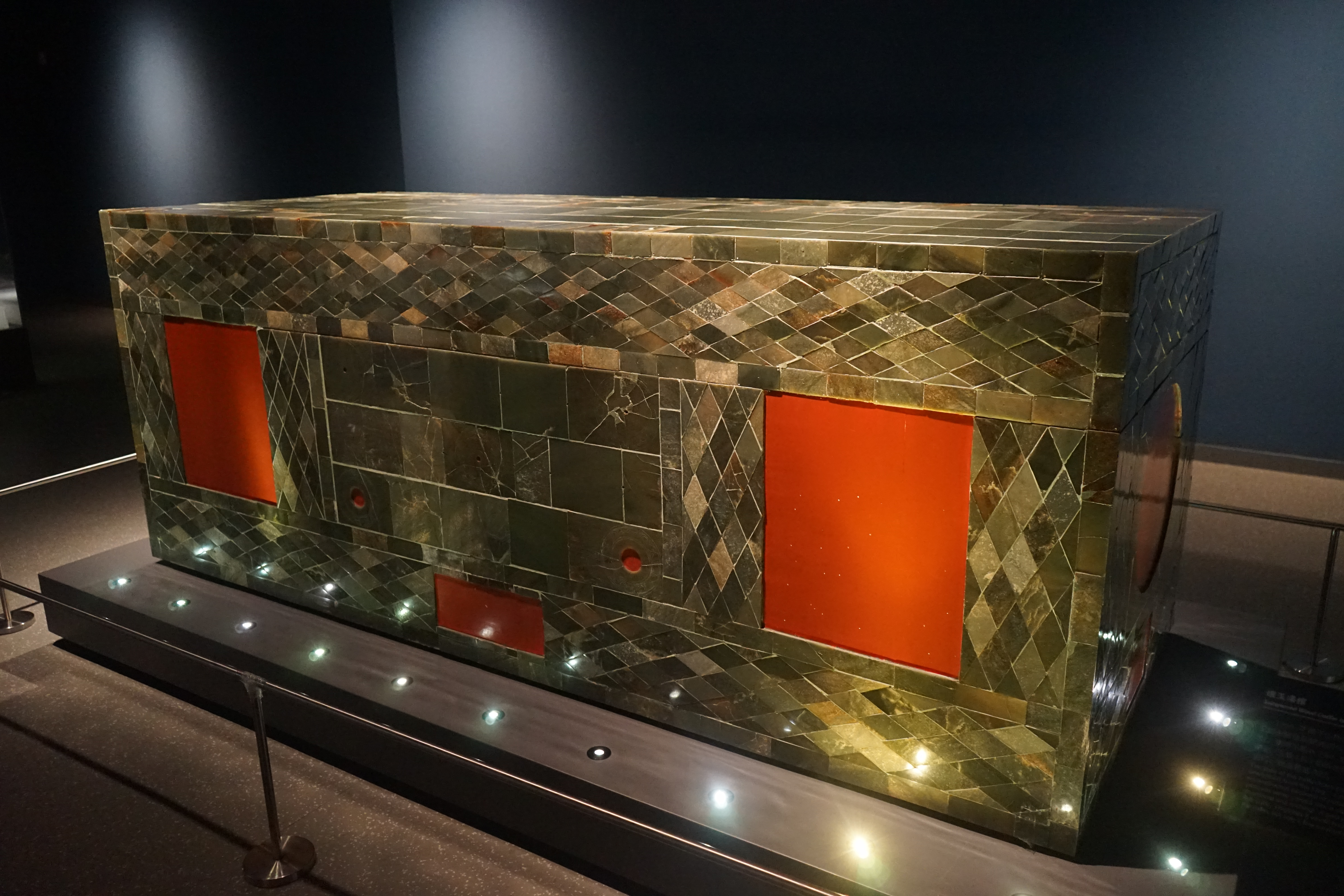
Liu Wu's lacquered wood coffin inlaid with jade

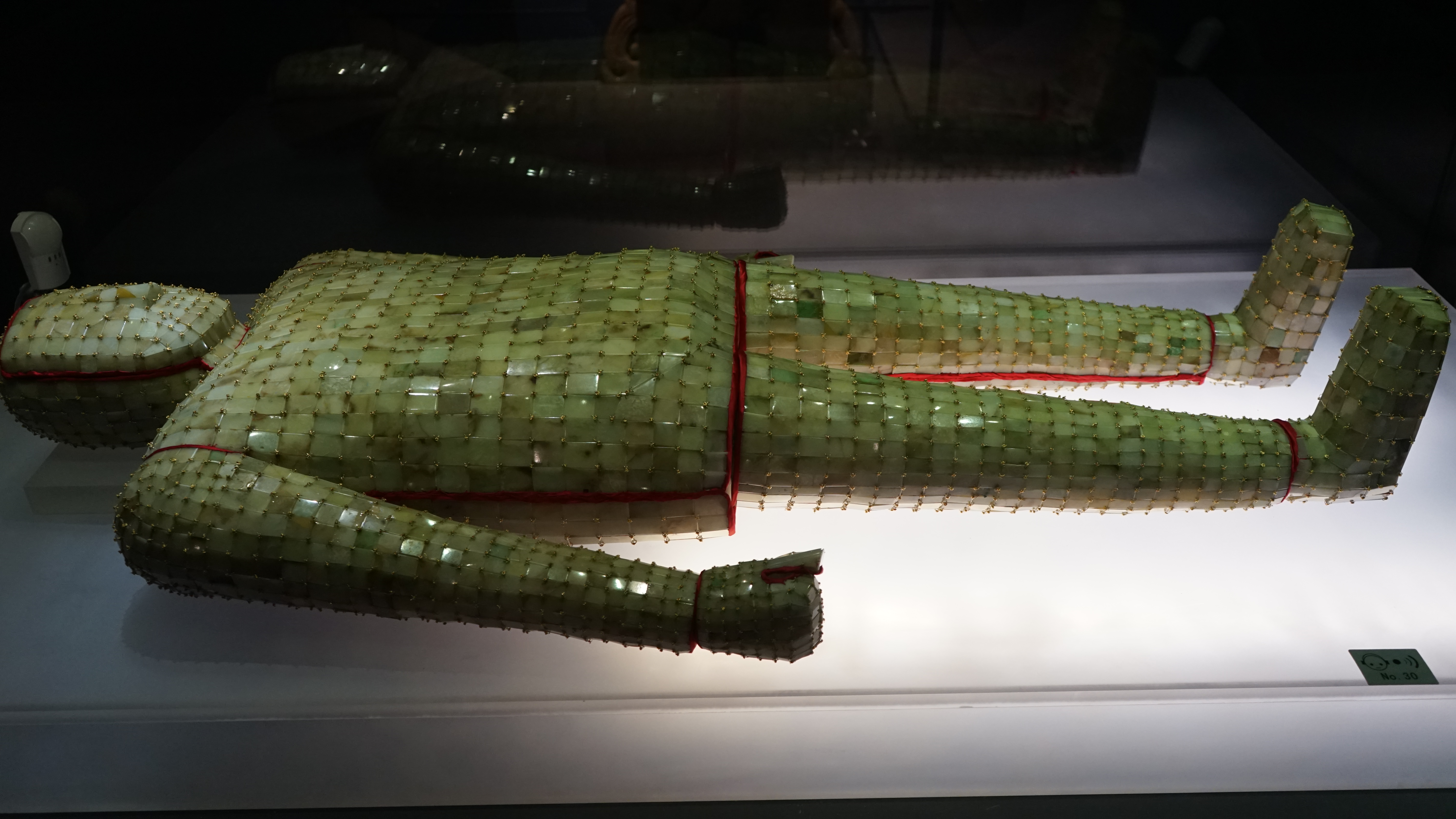
Liu Wu's jade shroud sewn with gold threads

==== Medieval period ====
In the early 4th century, Pengcheng became a frontier stronghold for the southern dynasties. Control of the city shifted—it fell to Later Zhao in 324 and was retaken by Eastern Jin forces in 384—while many of its inhabitants fled south to the lower Yangtze. These émigré (qiaoren) communities provided the recruits for the Beifu Army, a force that became the military base of Liu Yu, a member of the Liu clan of Pengcheng. He went on to found the Liu Song dynasty.

Administrative boundaries were frequently adjusted to reflect these military shifts. In 411, the Eastern Jin established North Xuzhou at Pengcheng, distinct from Xuzhou at Guangling, later Jingkou. By 421, the Liu Song dynasty restored the "Xuzhou" designation to Pengcheng and renamed its southern counterpart South Xuzhou.

Pengcheng withstood a Northern Wei siege in 450–451. This siege was also accompanied by "Disputation at Pengcheng", where envoys from both sides contended over which regime held the legitimate mandate over China. However, the city's eventual capture by the Northern Wei in 466 ended southern dynastic rule over the Huaibei region.

Located at the junction of the Si and Bian rivers, Xuzhou was a transport hub, though navigation was hindered by the "Two Rapids"—the Xuzhou Rapids [徐州洪, 1 kilometre (0.62 mi) southeast of the city] and the Lüliang Rapids [呂梁洪, 24 kilometres (15 mi) south of the city]. Due to these rocky obstructions, the Sui dynasty's Tongji Canal adopted a circuitous route to bypass the city.

During the early Tang dynasty, the region's registered population grew substantially. The registered population of Pengcheng, Feng, and Pei counties rose from 21,768 individuals in 639 to 205,286 by 742.

Following the An Lushan Rebellion, Xuzhou secured the defense of the Bian Canal—the main Jianghuai–Guanzhong logistics route. In 781, during the Rebellion of the Four Garrisons, the rebel Li Na seized the city to sever imperial logistics until the prefect Li Wei restored Tang control. In 788, the region was reorganized as a military circuit under Zhang Jianfeng, and was formally designated as the Wuning (武寧, "Pacification through Force") circuit in 805.

Subsequently, the circuit underwent a process of localization, evolving into a localized military interest group centered on the "Silver Sword" (Yindao) corps. Driven by their own strategic interests, this elite unit frequently prevented imperial governors from effectively exercising their mandates.

In response, the Tang court disbanded the garrison in 862, when Governor Wang Shi disbanded the garrison. This measure drove many displaced soldiers into banditry or long-term border service in Lingnan. In 868, citing grievances over delayed rotations, 800 Wuning soldiers mutinied in Guilin under Pang Xun. Exacerbated by regional famine, the rebellion swelled into a composite force—reportedly numbering 200,000—that seized Xuzhou.

The court deployed Shatuo Turk cavalry under Li Guochang to suppress the insurgency. Following a year of intense combat, the circuit was symbolically renamed Ganhua (感化; "Transformation through Influence"), to signify pacification. Nevertheless, Xuzhou maintained a state of de facto autonomy through the final years of the Tang dynasty.

==== Song to Qing dynasties ====
During the Northern Song, the Liguo Industrial Prefecture, 34 kilometres (21 mi) north of the city, emerged as a major metallurgical center; it operated 36 private smelters with thousands of laborers, reaching an estimated annual capacity of several thousand tonnes.

Local hydrological instability emerged in the 10th century. In 1019, a Yellow River breach caused widespread flooding that fully inundated the walled city of Xuzhou. A subsequent breach in 1077 necessitated further fortification; Prefect Su Shi oversaw the construction of defensive "Su Embankment" (Sudi, 蘇堤) on the city's western perimeter.

In early 1129, the Jurchen army captured the city. As the Yellow River permanently captured the Huai River course, Xuzhou was a major but flood-prone node for Grand Canal transit. In 1352, Yuan Chancellor Toqto suppressed the Red Turban forces led by "Sesame Li" in Xuzhou to secure imperial grain routes, briefly renaming the city Wu'an (武安; literally "Peace Restored by Force").

During the late imperial period, the city functioned as a key node at the intersection of Grand Canal logistics and the management of the volatile Yellow River. Following the Ming capital's relocation to Beijing, the city hosted the major granary and one of the seven national customs barriers (chaoguan, 鈔關).

To maintain the imperial tribute, tens of thousands of households in the region were responsible for approximately 40,000 annual corvée laborers, primarily rotary laborers (banfu, 班夫) and specialized rapids haulers (hongfu, 洪夫). The service levy for these duties reached up to 12 taels per hongfu, leading to late-16th-century reforms that halved the required payments. In 1605, the completion of the Jia Canal (泇河) redirected the Grand Canal's main artery to the northeast to bypass the rapids; consequently, the majority of canal traffic no longer passed through or docked at Xuzhou, after which the city's commercial activity declined.

Some historians argue that Yellow River management in the late 16th century prioritized imperial tribute and the Ming Ancestral Mausoleum over regional safety. The 1579 "flush silt with clear water" (xuqing shuahuang, 蓄清刷黃) policy was intended to scour the riverbed with high-velocity currents, but led to increased siltation near Xuzhou. By the 1590s, the city's embankments were raised level with its walls, and in 1624, a deluge buried the walled city under four meters of water and sediment.

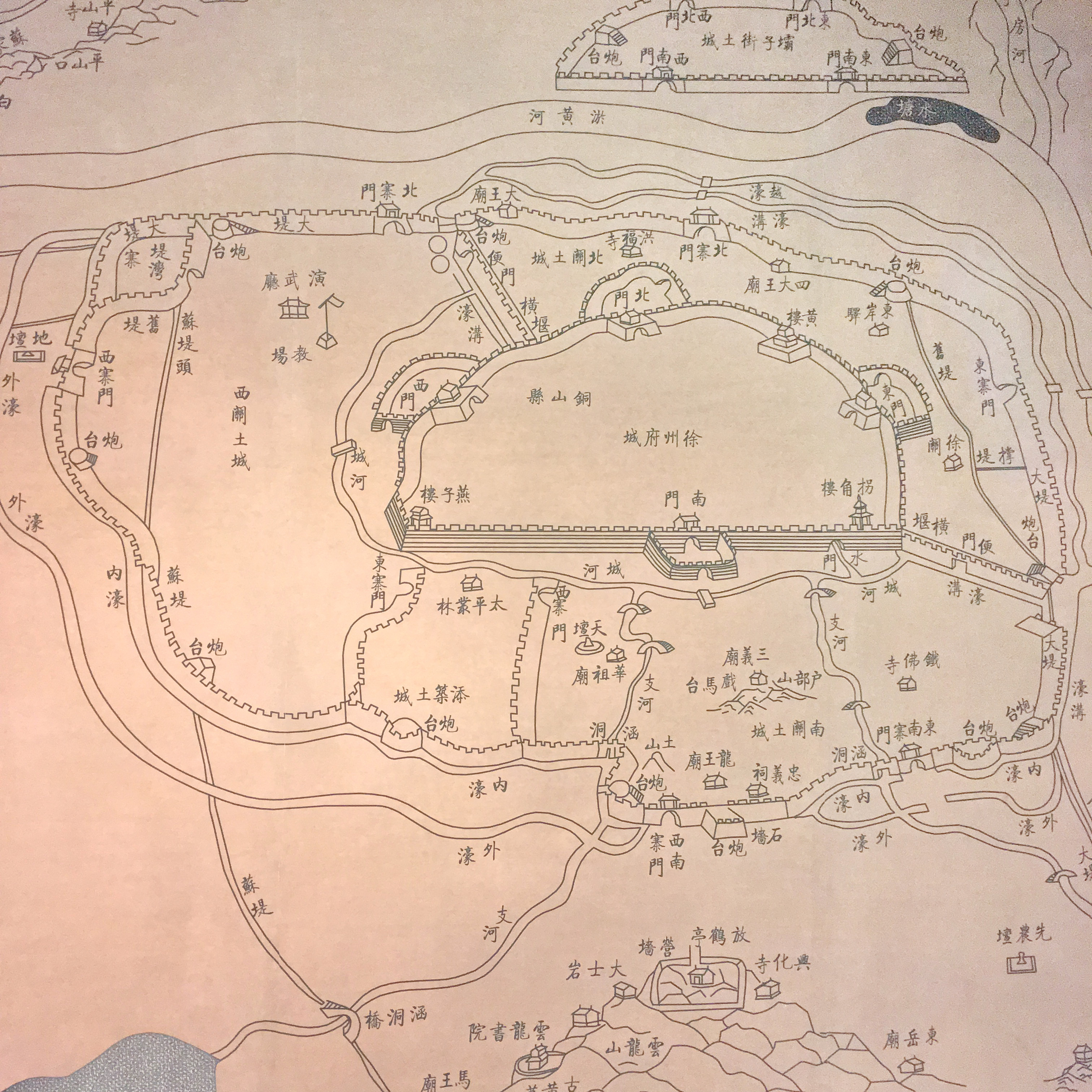
Map of the prefectural city of Xuzhou in the late Qing, the outer earthen ramparts against the Nian Rebellion is also shown.

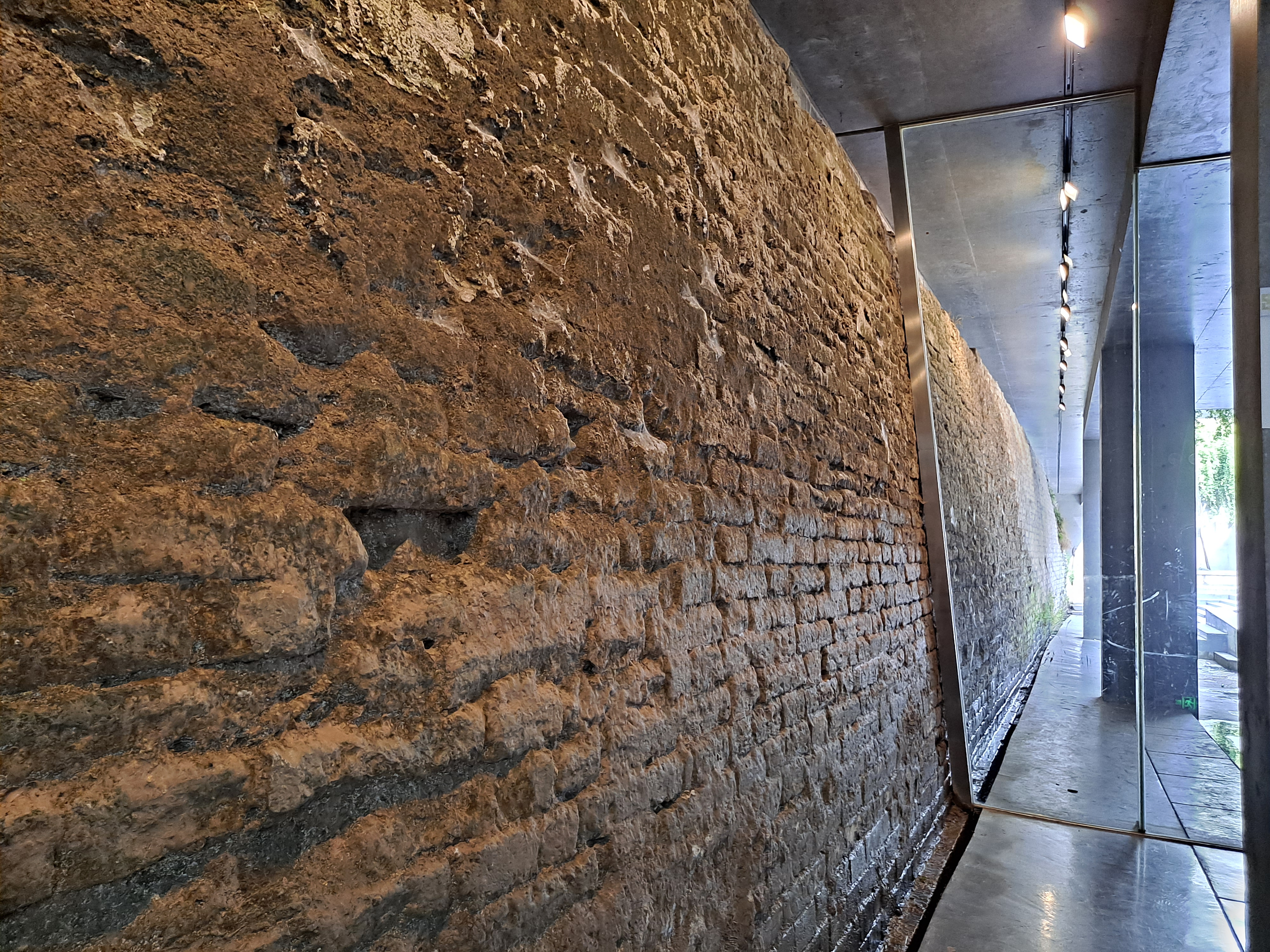
A section of the Ming city wall buried by river sediment, excavated and displayed in situ at the Xuzhou City Wall Museum.

During the Ming-Qing transition, Xuzhou was one of the Four Jiangbei Garrisons (江北四鎮) defending the southern bank of the Yellow River for the Nanjing-based Ming court. The city was taken by the Qing in mid-1645. Local gentry Yan Ermei (閻爾梅) and Wan Shouqi (萬壽祺), known as "Two Ming Loyalists of Xuzhou", refused to hold office under the new dynasty.

The 1668 Tancheng Earthquake caused severe damage and casualties throughout Xuzhou. In 1733, the Qing government reorganized Xuzhou into a prefecture, establishing Tongshan county—named after an island in the Nansi Lakes—as its seat. The prefecture administered the counties of Tongshan, Feng, Pei, Dangshan, Xiao, Suining, and Suqian, as well as the department of Pizhou (encompassing modern Xinyi).

In the 1850s, the Yellow River shifted northward, restructuring the region's environmental and socioeconomic landscape. An 1851 breach flooded the western shores of the Nansi Lakes; when the river changed course again in 1855, the canal system was rendered defunct. As the water receded, the newly exposed land led to fierce competition between returning locals and Shandong migrants. These migrants organized paramilitary "Lakeside Communities" (hutuan, 湖團), sparking long-term land disputes along the Jiangsu-Shandong border.

In the aftermath of the Opium Wars, Xuzhou became a major opium-producing region. In 1891, the Native Opium Consolidated Tax Bureau was established to levy a uniform duty on merchants until 1910. Furthermore, the regional economic collapse of the canal system and the devastation of the floods fueled large-scale rural insurgencies, including the Nian Rebellion, and the Big Swords Society.

=== Modern China ===
==== Early Republican era (1911–1937) ====
Following the Revolution of 1911, the completion of the Tianjin–Pukou (1912) and Kaifeng–Xuzhou (a section of the Longhai, 1915) railways established Xuzhou as a junction, making it a recurring target for competing factions. General Zhang Xun utilized the city as a primary base; between 1916 and 1917, he convened four "Xuzhou Conferences" to consolidate the influence of the "Provincial Military Governors" (督軍團), and heavily influenced Beijing's policies.

In 1921, communist activists began organizing Xuzhou's railway workers. In November, a strike erupted at the Tongshan locomotive shop after workers were locked behind "Gate No. 8" at shift-end. Amid long-standing grievances over labor conditions and foreign management, the dismissal of two worker leaders escalated the protest into a Longhai Railway general strike, culminating in the 1922 establishment of Jiangsu's first Communist Party branch. In 1922, the Beiyang government formally designated Xuzhou as a commercial port.

Warlord factionalism persisted through the 1920s, while bandit activity persisted in the area; in 1923, citing the inability of official militias to counter the threat, surrounding villages initiated anti-tax protests, which were subsequently suppressed by Xuzhou authorities. The authorities declared martial law in the autumn of 1926 following reports that educators were smuggling arms to students to support the Northern Expedition.

The city was captured by Nationalist forces in June 1927. On 20 June, Chiang Kai-shek met with Northwest Army leader Feng Yuxiang in the city to form an alliance. A subsequent counteroffensive by the Sun Chuanfang–Zhang Zongchang coalition forced a brief Nationalist withdrawal and contributed to Chiang's resignation, but the city was recaptured by Nationalist forces in December. During the 1930 Central Plains War, Chiang personally directed armored car units from Xuzhou to secure the rail hub against the Feng–Yan Xishan coalition.

While conflict between local activists and party officials led to the closure of over half the subcounty primary schools in Tongshan by early 1928, the region remained a source of student activism. Following the 1931 Mukden Incident, a Xuzhou delegation of 1,300 students arrived in Nanjing on December 2 to petition the government, converged with students from Yenching University, and directly confronted Foreign Minister Wellington Koo, demanding a resolute diplomatic stance and the abolition of unequal treaties.

==== Second Sino-Japanese War (1937–1945) ====
After the Battle of Shanghai, the Military Affairs Commission established the Fifth War Area, with its headquarters at Xuzhou under the command of Li Zongren. The city had experienced Japanese bombardment since August 1937. By early 1938, Nationalist military leadership anticipated a Japanese pincer movement to seize Xuzhou and secure the Tianjin–Pukou railway. Nationalist forces concentrated in the region and won a major victory at Tai'erzhuang, but the Japanese Imperial General Headquarters subsequently abandoned its earlier policy against expanding the theater of operations and ordered a large-scale pincer offensive toward Xuzhou on April 7.

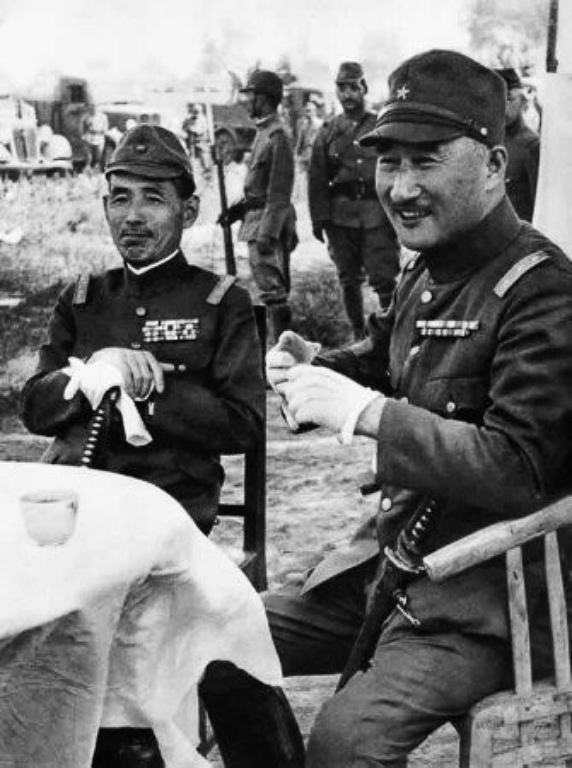
Terauchi Hisaichi (right) and Shunroku Hata (left) meeting in Xuzhou after the city's fall, May 1938

Japanese forces reached the outskirts on May 16 and began shelling the city; Li Zongren's headquarters withdrew south the next day, and he ordered a general withdrawal on May 18. Japanese troops entered Xuzhou from the west on May 19. To impede the Japanese advance, the Nationalists made the strategic decision in June to breach the Yellow River dikes at Huayuankou, triggering catastrophic flooding across the regions west and south of Xuzhou.

Even before the city's fall, missionaries had organized relief for civilians. On May 9, an International Relief Committee headed by Monseigneur Côté of the Jesuit mission was established in Xuzhou, reportedly modeled on the Nanking Safety Zone organized by John Rabe. From May 10 to 11, 1938, air raids struck the Southern Presbyterian Mission in Xuzhou; the Mark B. Grier Memorial Church was hit three times and destroyed despite visible American markings on its roof, prompting a formal U.S. diplomatic protest. These early raids demolished over 1,000 buildings and inflicted hundreds of civilian casualties. On May 14, the city was subjected to another indiscriminate bombing by fifty-four Japanese planes, resulting in over a hundred additional deaths and extensive structural destruction across the urban center. A July 1938 U.S. diplomatic report, citing missionary A. A. McFadyen, characterized the Japanese military conduct in Xuzhou as a "duplicate" of the occupation of Nanking.

In 1939, Xuzhou was established as a municipality (or city) from the urban areas of Tongshan county. It was initially administered by the North China Political Council, reorganized as the Su-Huai Special Region in 1942, and became the capital of Huaihai province (淮海省) in 1944 under the Wang Jingwei regime.

On August 3, 1945, the 1st Bomb Squadron of the Chinese-American Composite Wing raided Xuzhou. U.S. mission reports claimed successful strikes on rail facilities, and the Chongqing authorities reported the destruction of South Station. However, Nanjing authorities reported that bombs struck Nanguan (the city's southern suburb). Later local accounts put the final civilian death toll at approximately 700.

==== Post-war transition and PRC administration (since 1945) ====
The Nationalist government resumed control in September 1945. Xuzhou subsequently hosted the "Committee of Three" (including George Marshall) for ceasefire negotiations in March 1946, and was designated as one of the locations for the Chinese war crimes courts.

By June 1948, the city became the seat of the Nationalist "Bandit Suppression" Headquarters (剿匪總司令部), commanding about 800,000 troops. Following the decisive Huaihai Campaign, Communist forces took control on December 1, 1948—an outcome that facilitated the eventual capture of the Nationalist capital, Nanjing.

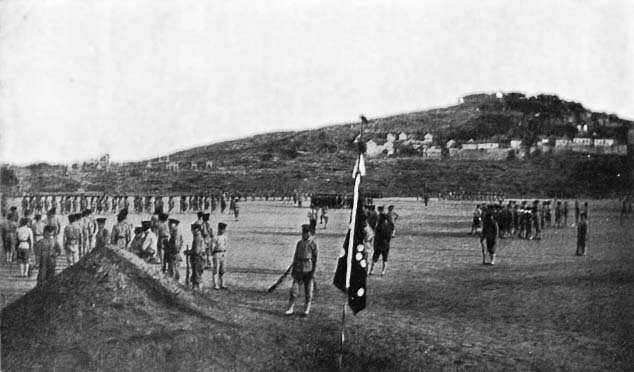
Zhang Xun's troops in Xuzhou, the 1910s

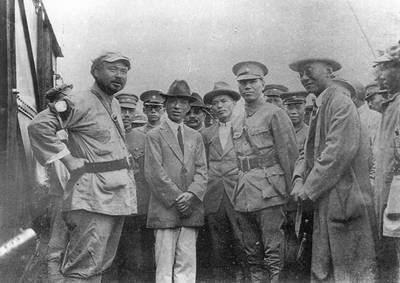
Chiang Kai-shek conferred with Feng Yuxiang in Xuzhou, 1927

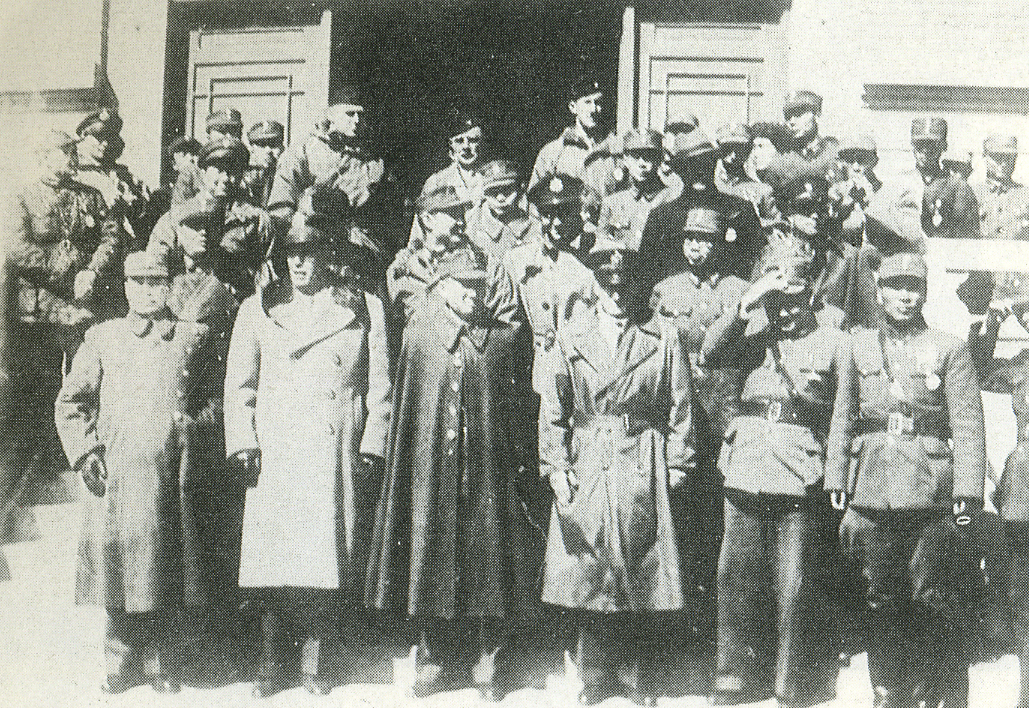
The "Committee of Three" met in Xuzhou, 1946

Administered by Shandong after 1949, Xuzhou reverted to Jiangsu in 1953. Following the 1955 transfer of Dangshan and Xiao counties to Anhui, the region maintained a dual-track administration—comprising a Municipality (urban core) and a Prefecture (renamed Region in 1970)—for three decades.

Following the onset of the Cultural Revolution, Xuzhou's Railway Branch Bureau was heavily affected by factional strife, causing severe disruptions to transportation. In 1967, Premier Zhou Enlai approved the imposition of military control over the bureau to restore order. In 1975, Minister Wan Li intervened to resolve severe transport blockages in Xuzhou caused by later factionalism. By restoring centralized ministerial control and suppressing local factions, Deng Xiaoping established the "Xuzhou Experience" (徐州经验) as the national template for the "all-round readjustment" of the Chinese economy.

In 1986, 15 prefectures and cities formally established the Xuzhou-centered Huaihai Economic Zone, a pioneering case of trans-administrative integration in contemporary China. On April 22, 1993, the State Council ratified Xuzhou as a "Larger Municipality" with independent legislative power.

== Administration ==
The prefecture-level city of Xuzhou administers ten county-level divisions, including five districts, two county-level cities and three counties.

These are further divided into 161 township-level divisions, including 63 subdistricts and 98 towns.

Map
Name	Chinese	Hanyu Pinyin	Population (2020)	Area (km^{2})	Density (/km^{2})
City Proper
Gulou District	鼓楼区	Gǔlóu Qū	806,550	222.6	3,623
Yunlong District	云龙区	Yúnlóng Qū	471,566	120.0	3,930
Quanshan District	泉山区	Quánshān Qū	619,784	102.4	6,053
Suburban
Jiawang District	贾汪区	Jiǎwāng Qū	453,555	612.4	740.6
Tongshan District	铜山区	Tóngshān Qū	1,237,760	1,952	634.1
Rural
Feng County	丰县	Fēng Xiàn	935,200	1,447	646.3
Pei County	沛县	Pèi Xiàn	1,038,337	1,328	781.9
Suining County	睢宁县	Suīníng Xiàn	1,088,553	1,768	615.7
Satellite cities (County-level cities)
Xinyi City	新沂市	Xīnyí Shì	969,922	1,573	616.6
Pizhou City	邳州市	Pīzhōu Shì	1,462,563	2,086	701.1
Total			9,083,790	11,211	810.3

== Geography ==
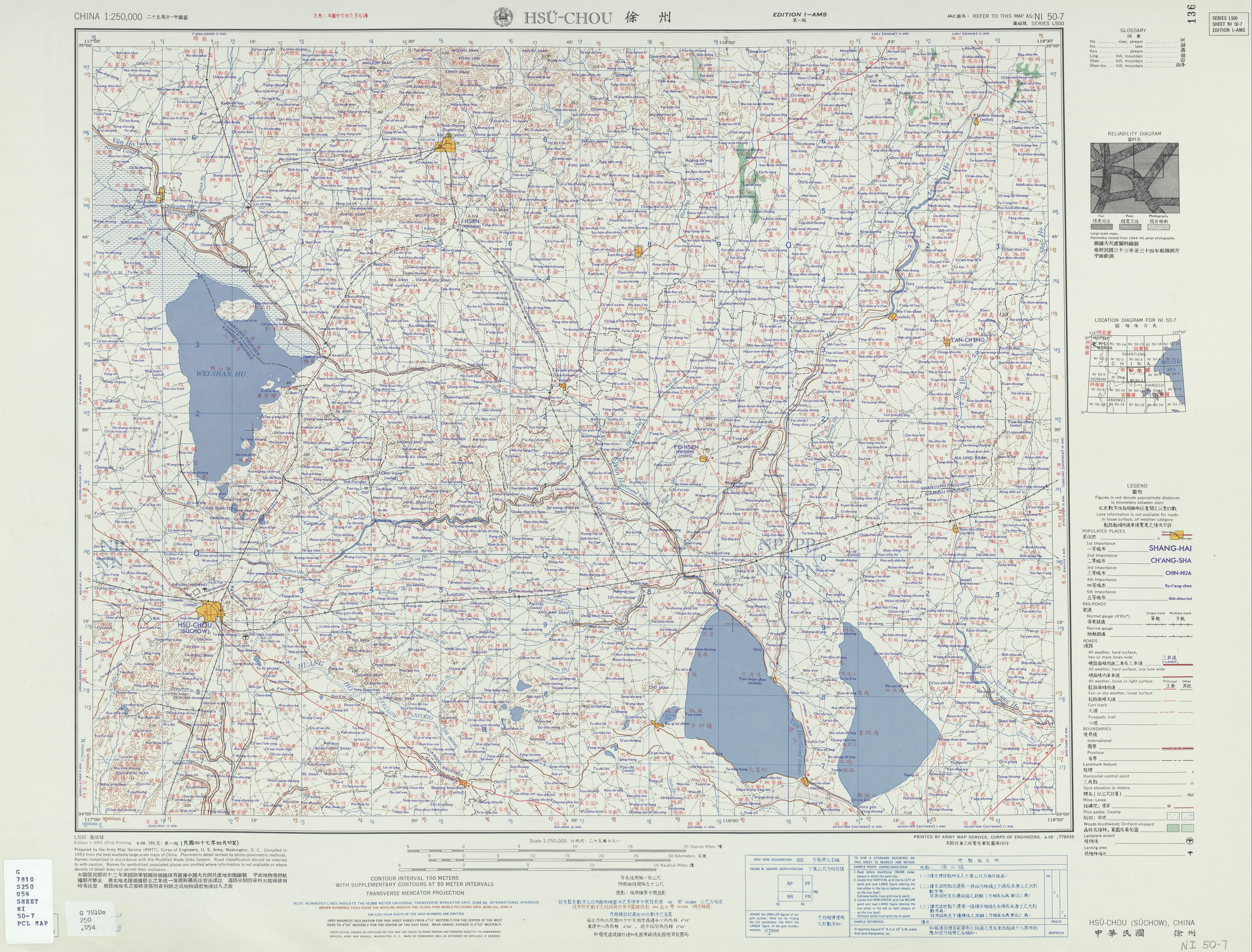
Map including Xuzhou (labeled as HSÜ-CHOU (SÜCHOW) 徐州) (AMS, 1953)

Xuzhou is situated at the southeastern extremity of the North China Plain, serving as a geographical transition zone between the Yellow River's alluvial fan and the Huai River basin. The landscape comprises an undulating plain underlain by 10–60 metres (33–197 ft) of deep alluvial deposits from historical Yellow River migrations.

This terrain is punctuated by limestone inselberg (isolated rock hills) that rise abruptly from the floodplain, including Yunlong Mountain [142 metres (466 ft)] and the region's highest point, Dadong Mountain [361 metres (1,184 ft)]. Geologically, these formations constitute the Xuzhou–Huaibei fold-thrust belt at the southeastern margin of the North China Craton.

Tectonic activity along the Tancheng–Lujiang (Tan-Lu) fault zone led to the formation of the Xuzhou and Feng-Pei coalfields. By the late 1990s, the region's proven coal reserves reached 3.94 billion tonnes—accounting for over 93% of Jiangsu province's total.

Intensive coal mining has caused landscape fragmentation and subsidence-induced flooding. Through the closure of small-scale mines and ecological restoration—including the conversion of waterlogged subsidence areas in northern Xuzhou and Jiawang into the Jiuli Lake and Pan'an Lake artificial wetlands—the local environment has partially recovered.

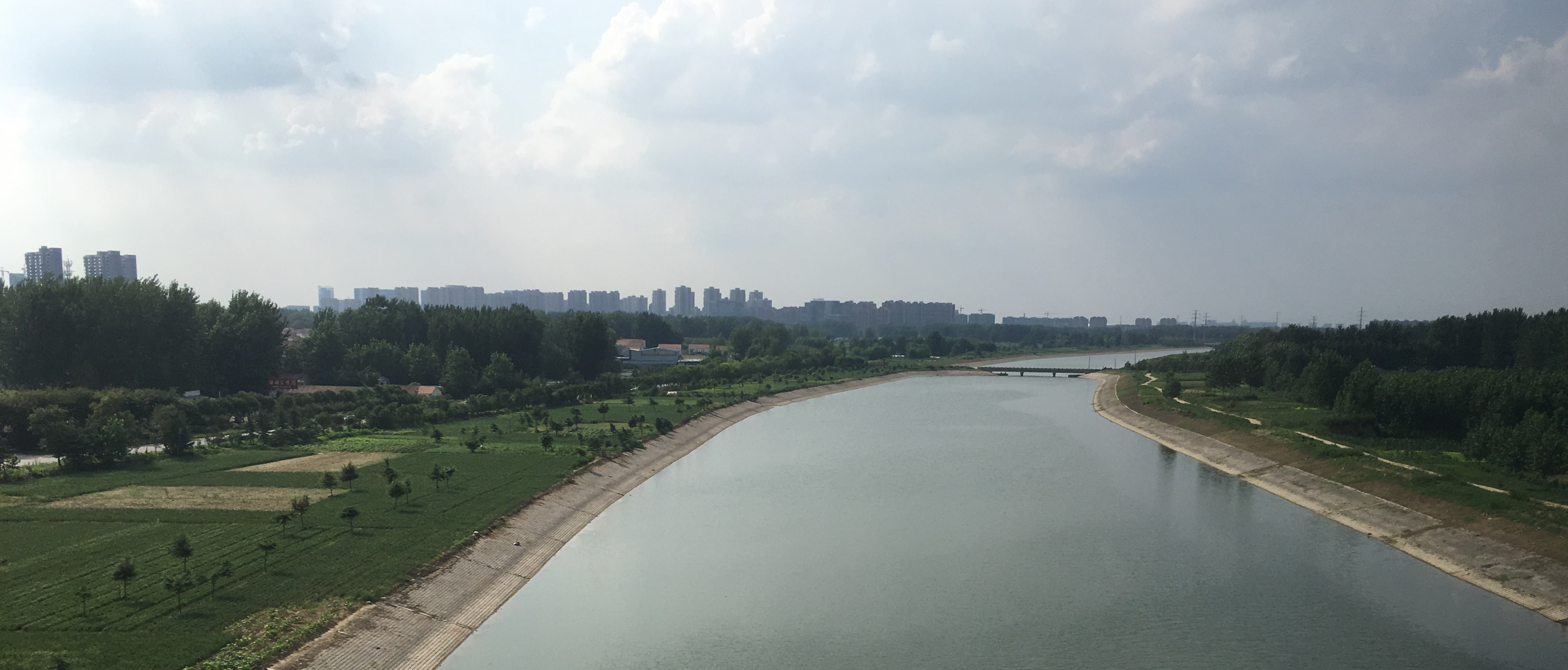
A Stretch of the Abandoned Yellow River in Xuzhou

The regional hydrology is defined by two major man-made waterways: the Beijing–Hangzhou Grand Canal and the Abandoned Course of the Yellow River. Functioning as a "perched river" with its bed elevated 2–5 metres (6.6–16.4 ft) above the surrounding terrain, the abandoned course now acts as a drainage divide between the Huai and Yi-Shu-Si river systems.

Due to its low-lying topography, the elevated riverbed, and its location at the meandering transition, the region was historically plagued by floods; records indicate 59 levee breaches near Xuzhou between 1550 and 1855.

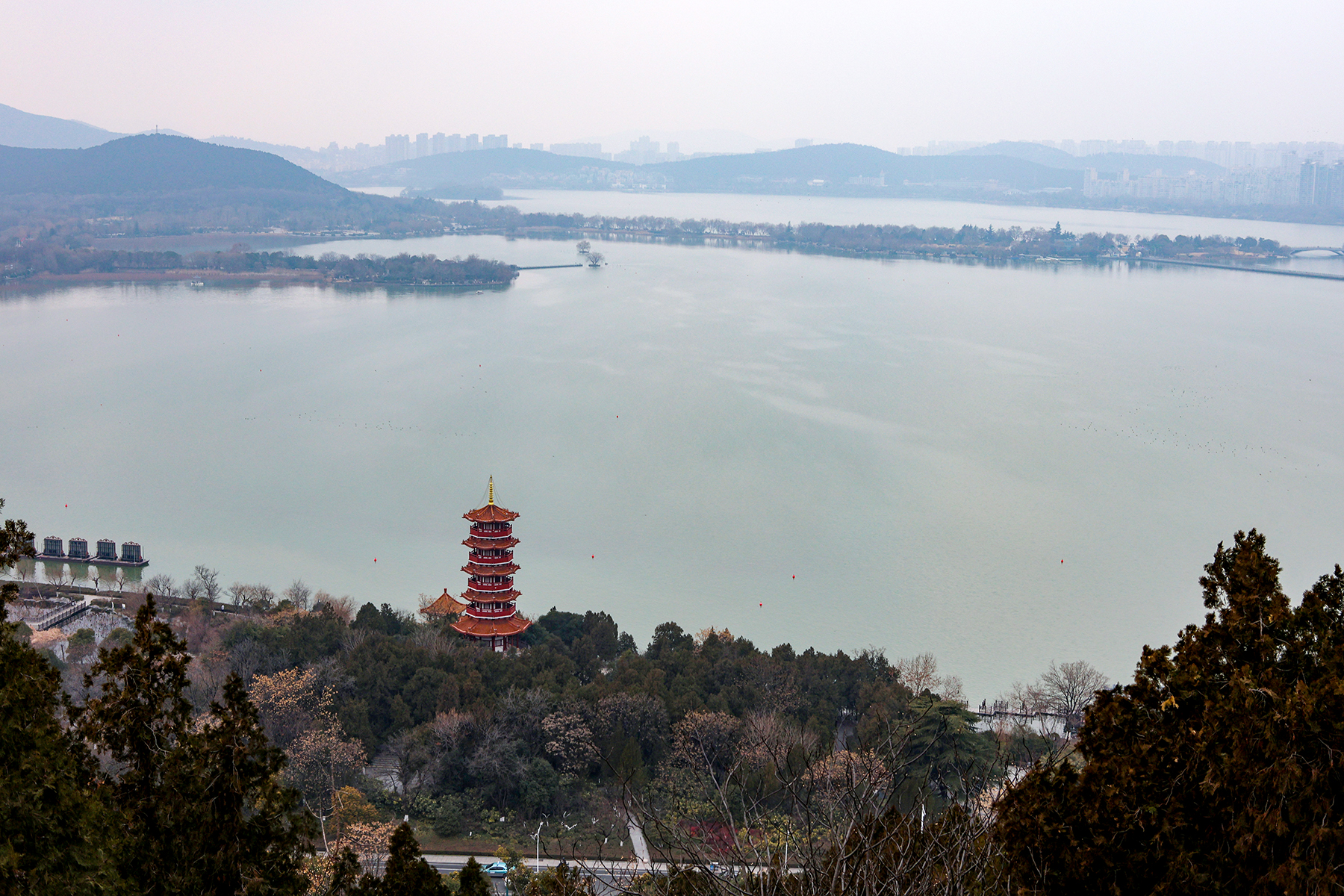
Yunlong Lake in winter

While the ancient riverbed now bisects the city proper, Yunlong Lake, with a water area of 5.82 square kilometres (2.25 sq mi), serves as a scenic reservoir to the southwest. Its outlet, the Kui River, flows southward for 35.6 kilometres (22.1 mi) into Anhui province. Historically one of the most polluted tributaries in the Huai River basin, a downtown section of the river was encased in concrete in 2005 to contain odorous emissions. Following extensive ecological remediation, these covers were removed in 2021, restoring the waterway as an open-air corridor.

While situated on a relatively stable fault zone independent of the main Tan-Lu system, the urban area remains at risk due to historical loose silt deposits that are prone to liquefaction, which can cause the ground to behave like a liquid and intensify earthquake damage.

=== Climate ===
Xuzhou has a monsoon-influenced humid subtropical climate (Köppen Cwa), with cool, dry winters, warm springs, long, hot and humid summers, and crisp autumns. The monthly daily average temperature ranges from 0.7 °C (33.3 °F) in January to 27.3 °C (81.1 °F) in July; the annual mean is 14.9 °C (58.8 °F). Snow may occur during winter, though rarely heavily. Precipitation is light in winter, and a majority of the annual total of 842.8 millimetres (33.2 in) occurs from June thru August. With monthly percent possible sunshine ranging from 44% in July to 54% in three months, the city receives 2,221 hours of bright sunshine annually.

Climate data for Xuzhou, elevation 41 m (135 ft), (1991–2020 normals, extremes 1951–present)
Month	Jan	Feb	Mar	Apr	May	Jun	Jul	Aug	Sep	Oct	Nov	Dec	Year
Record high °C (°F)	19.8 (67.6)	25.9 (78.6)	32.9 (91.2)	34.8 (94.6)	38.2 (100.8)	40.6 (105.1)	43.4 (110.1)	38.3 (100.9)	36.7 (98.1)	34.5 (94.1)	29.0 (84.2)	22.2 (72.0)	43.4 (110.1)
Mean daily maximum °C (°F)	5.6 (42.1)	9.1 (48.4)	14.8 (58.6)	21.4 (70.5)	26.7 (80.1)	30.7 (87.3)	31.8 (89.2)	30.8 (87.4)	27.2 (81.0)	21.9 (71.4)	14.4 (57.9)	7.7 (45.9)	20.2 (68.3)
Daily mean °C (°F)	1.0 (33.8)	4.1 (39.4)	9.5 (49.1)	16.0 (60.8)	21.5 (70.7)	25.8 (78.4)	27.7 (81.9)	26.8 (80.2)	22.5 (72.5)	16.5 (61.7)	9.2 (48.6)	2.9 (37.2)	15.3 (59.5)
Mean daily minimum °C (°F)	−2.6 (27.3)	0.1 (32.2)	4.8 (40.6)	10.8 (51.4)	16.4 (61.5)	21.2 (70.2)	24.3 (75.7)	23.5 (74.3)	18.5 (65.3)	12.0 (53.6)	5.0 (41.0)	−0.8 (30.6)	11.1 (52.0)
Record low °C (°F)	−17.3 (0.9)	−22.6 (−8.7)	−7.6 (18.3)	−1.4 (29.5)	4.8 (40.6)	12.4 (54.3)	15.8 (60.4)	13.4 (56.1)	5.0 (41.0)	−1.0 (30.2)	−8.3 (17.1)	−13.5 (7.7)	−22.6 (−8.7)
Average precipitation mm (inches)	18.4 (0.72)	20.9 (0.82)	32.3 (1.27)	36.8 (1.45)	64.3 (2.53)	118.4 (4.66)	238.3 (9.38)	152.6 (6.01)	70.3 (2.77)	38.5 (1.52)	35.6 (1.40)	19.1 (0.75)	845.5 (33.28)
Average precipitation days (≥ 0.1 mm)	4.3	4.9	5.7	6.7	6.7	7.4	12.8	11.2	7.4	5.7	5.9	4.2	82.9
Average snowy days	3.4	2.6	1.1	0	0	0	0	0	0	0	0.6	1.9	9.6
Average relative humidity (%)	66	63	60	61	63	65	78	80	74	69	70	67	68
Mean monthly sunshine hours	137.3	145.9	189.8	215.1	227.0	203.4	182.4	181.2	178.2	179.4	152.6	145.7	2,138
Percentage possible sunshine	44	47	51	55	53	47	42	44	48	52	49	48	48
Source: China Meteorological AdministrationNOAA

== Demographics ==
Historical populations of Xuzhou (Permanent Residents)
Year	Pop.	±% p.a.
1964	4,778,675	—
1982	6,809,138	+1.99%
1990	8,161,979	+2.29%
2000	8,913,965	+0.89%
2005	8,813,300	−0.23%
2010	8,582,100	−0.53%
2015	8,788,600	+0.48%
2020	9,083,900	+0.66%
2021	9,028,500	−0.61%
2022	9,018,500	−0.11%
2023	9,020,000	+0.02%
Note: Figures from 1964 to 2000 are based on the National Census. Figures from 2005 onwards are sourced from the Xuzhou Statistical Yearbook. Source:

In the 2020 census, Xuzhou recorded a permanent population of 9,083,900, an increase of 5.9% from 2010. By 2023, its permanent population accounted for approximately 10.6% of the total population of Jiangsu province.

Historically, the population of Xuzhou Prefecture (which then included present-day Dangshan, Xiao counties, and the urban districts of Suqian) grew from 2.95 million in 1776 to 4.34 million in 1910. Despite this growth, the region remained predominantly agricultural with minimal industrial or commercial activity; in 1910, the urban population of the prefectural seat was only approximately 32,000. Urbanization accelerated in the 20th century: the city's population reached 171,903 in 1931, 314,773 in 1947, and 333,190 in the 1953 Census.

== Economy ==
As of 2023, Xuzhou's GDP reached RMB 890.04 billion, with a per capita GDP of RMB 98,683 (c. US$14,000). The city serves as the largest economy of the Huaihai Economic Zone, recording the highest GDP, per capita GDP, and total retail sales (RMB 444.51 billion) among the region's member cities.

=== Energy Industry and Transition ===
Xuzhou's modern coal industry originated with the establishment of the Jiawang Coal Mine in 1882. Until the 1950s, it remained the only site of industrial-scale coal extraction in Jiangsu province. Driven by the 1970s energy crisis, a "multi-party development" model emerged, involving the Datun Mining Area (a "Shanghai Enclave") alongside mines operated by other regional authorities.

Since the 2000s, resource depletion led to the closure of most local mines, with the sector consolidating under three major entities: Xuzhou Mining Group, Shanghai Datun Energy Resources, and China Resources Tianneng Xuzhou Coal and Power. As of 2023, the industry's total assets for above-scale enterprises reached 41.98 billion RMB.

The transition to renewables began in 2006 with the establishment of GCL Silicon. In the same year, the company commissioned its first polysilicon facility in Xuzhou, which subsequently developed into a major production site for photovoltaic materials. In 2024, BYD began building a 30 GWh sodium-ion battery plant in Xuzhou.

=== Manufacturing and Engineering ===
The demands of coal mining anchored Xuzhou's equipment manufacturing sector, which evolved into a modern construction machinery cluster. XCMG, headquartered in Xuzhou, ranked fourth globally among construction equipment manufacturers by 2024 revenue.

As of 2023, the city's specialized equipment manufacturing sector comprised 225 enterprises above designated size. Annual output for major products included 143,167 tons of mining equipment and 729,259 tons of cranes. In addition to heavy machinery, Xuzhou has developed into a production base for two-wheelers, with annual motorcycle output totaling 526,300 units in 2023.

== Public services ==
=== Education ===
Xuzhou is a regional center for higher education, hosting 12 universities and colleges with a total enrollment of approximately 267,000 students as of 2023. Major institutions include:

- China University of Mining and Technology (CUMT): A national "Double First-Class" university; its predecessor, the Sichuan Institute of Mining and Technology, relocated from Hechuan in 1978.
- Jiangsu Normal University (JSNU): Founded in 1958 by merging the Jiangsu Teachers College (relocated from Wuxi) with the Xuzhou Teachers College.
- Xuzhou Medical University (XZMU): Established in 1958, originally as a branch of Nanjing Medical College.
- Xuzhou Institute of Technology: A municipal institution established in 2002.

=== Healthcare ===
Xuzhou serves as a regional healthcare hub for the Huaihai Economic Zone. As of 2023, the city hosts several Grade A tertiary comprehensive hospitals, notably the Affiliated Hospital of Xuzhou Medical University, Xuzhou Central Hospital, Xuzhou First People's Hospital, and Xuzhou Mining Group General Hospital.

== Culture and Society ==
=== Performing arts ===
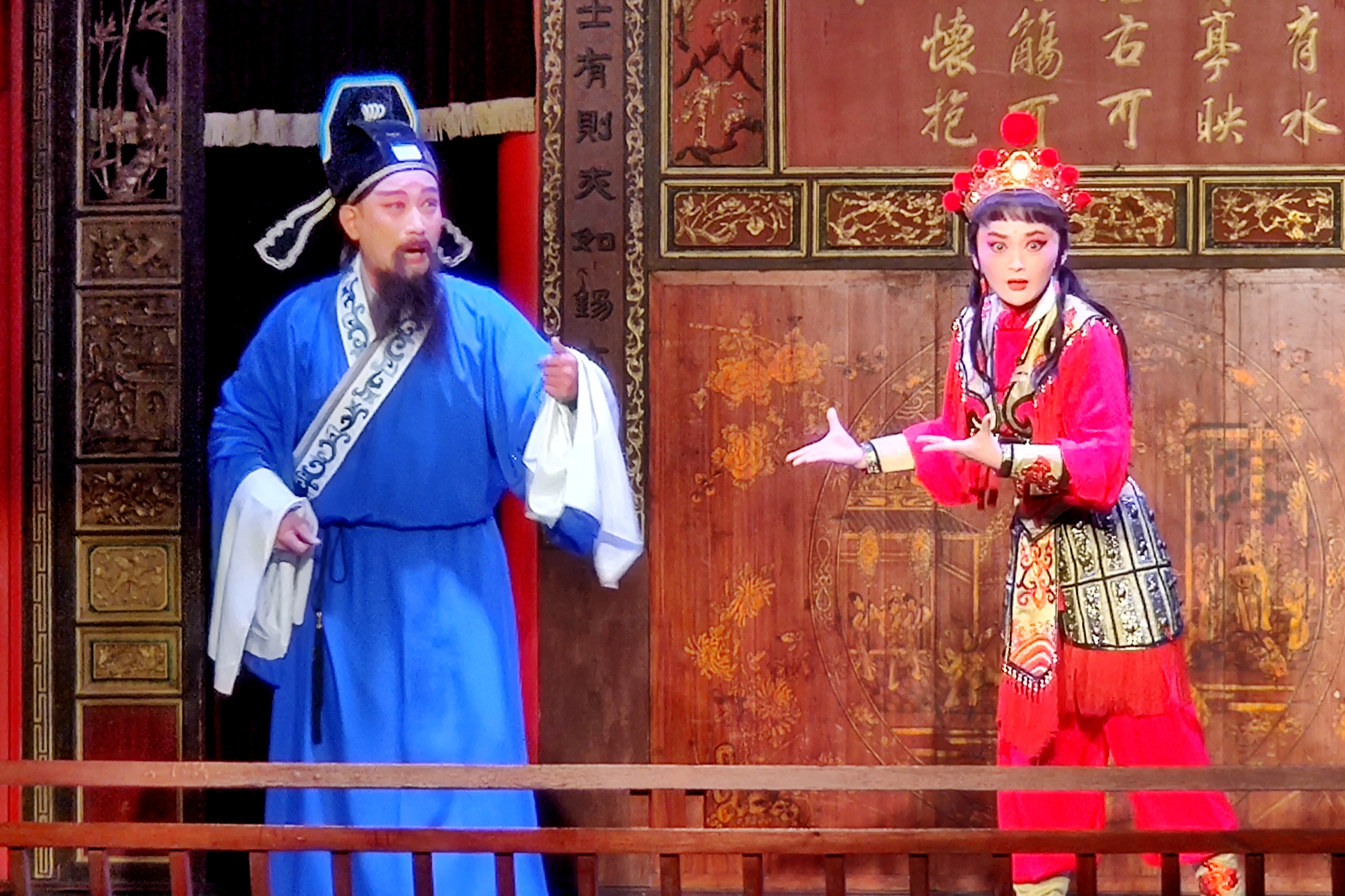
Jiangsu Bangzi: The Grudge and Grace of Mount Hua

During the Ming dynasty, Yuyao qiang was prevalent in Xuzhou. By the mid-Qing, Lahun qiang—a form popular across border regions among provinces—emerged, with its local variant evolving into Liuqin Opera. Concurrently, Northern Bangzi (Clapper) was introduced and localized, being officially designated as Jiangsu Bangzi (江苏梆子) in 1960.

In terms of modern facilities, the Xuzhou Concert Hall opened in 2011. Shaped like a myrtle flower, it has hosted the city's first philharmonic orchestra since its establishment in 2015.

=== Museums ===
Xuzhou contains various Han dynasty sites. The Xuzhou Museum houses jade artifacts and jade burial suits. The tombs of the Princes of Chu include the Lion Mountain (Shizishan) site, which contains a terracotta army, and the Guishan Han Tomb, a rock-cut structure. The Xuzhou Museum of Han Stone Reliefs preserves stone carvings from the period.

=== Cuisine ===
The regional cuisine blends characteristics of Huaiyang and Shandong cuisine, defined by salty and pungent flavors.

A staple is laomo (烙馍, locally pronounced luomo), a thin, chewy, unleavened flatbread used to wrap ingredients. Other common foods include local-style goat-meat noodles, rice noodles, and bazirou (braised pork belly). The city is noted for spicy soup (eel, hen, and gluten heavily seasoned with black pepper) and Sha soup (汤, hen, barley, and gluten seasoned with sesame oil); both can be served with beaten raw eggs.

The region also features diguo ("earth-pot") cookery: meat is simmered into a concentrated gravy while unleavened dough patches are pressed onto the pot's rim to be cooked by the rising steam. Historically, dog meat consumption was prevalent in the area. Since the 1980s expansion of goat husbandry, the annual Fuyang Festival (伏羊节, est. 2002) has institutionalized summer goat-meat consumption as a local tradition.

=== Folklore ===
In the late imperial period, Xuzhou became a subregional center for the worship of Bixia Yuanjun. A hill in the southern suburbs, home to a shrine later converted into a Buddhist temple, was renamed Mount Tai to serve as a local alternative to the original pilgrimage site in Shandong.

The Mount Tai Temple Fair is held annually in the middle of the fourth lunar month. Pilgrims from Xuzhou and neighboring areas attend the fair, often to pray for progeny; the traditional ritual involves performing prostrations from the northern foot of the mountain up the stone steps to the main hall. The event features a large market selling local snacks and traditional handicrafts. By the early 20th century, the fair's scale was sufficient to cause the closure of local schools and businesses. Though suspended in the mid-20th century, the tradition was revived in 1977 and has since been developed as a local tourism project.

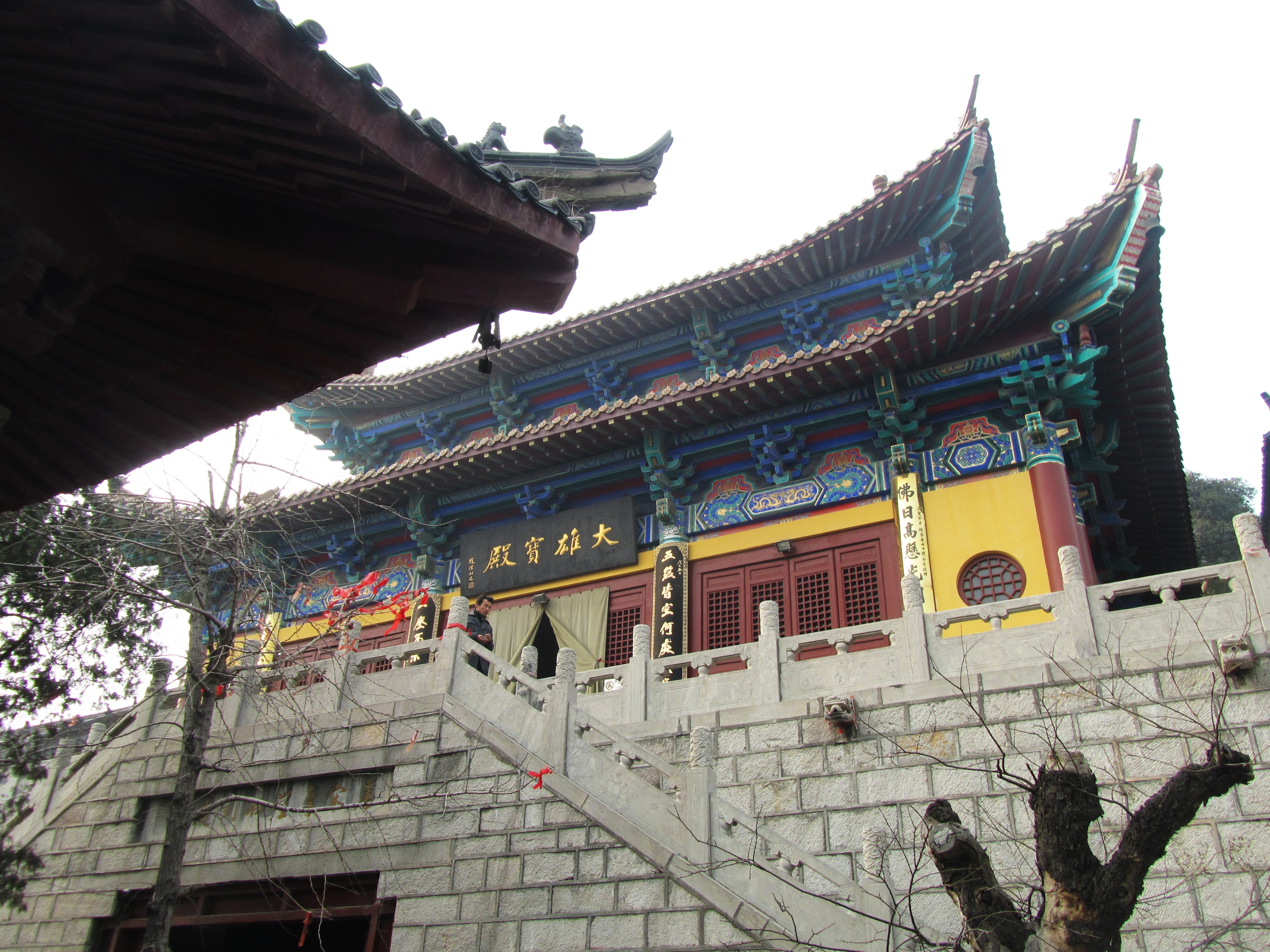
The buildings of Xinghua Temple were erected from the Song dynasty onwards

=== Religion ===
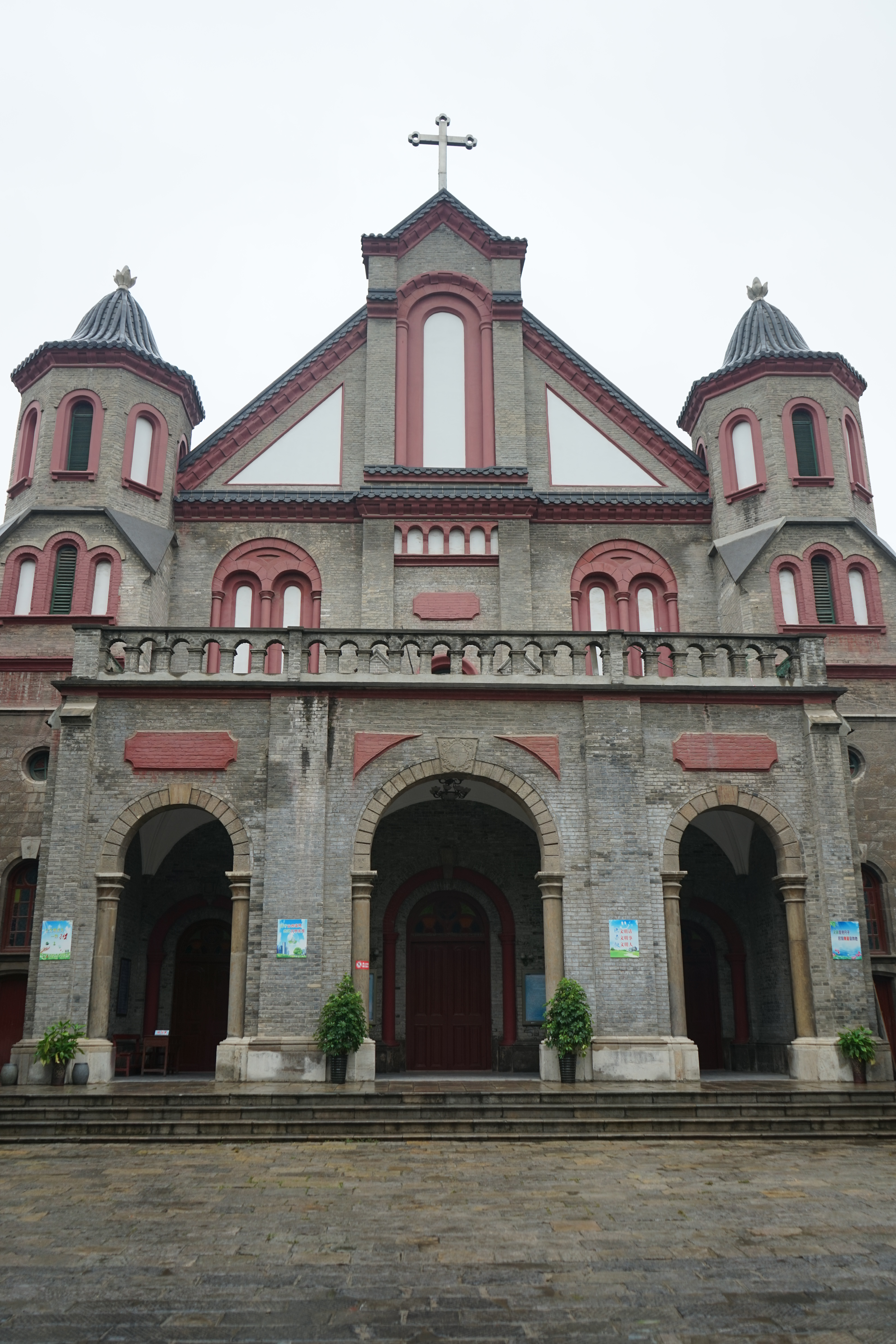
Cathedral of the Sacred Heart of Jesus, Diocese of Xuzhou

During the Han dynasty, Xuzhou emerged as the site of China's earliest recorded Buddhist community.

==== Catholicism ====
The modern Catholic mission in Xuzhou began in 1882 with the arrival of French priest Leopold Gain. In 1931, the mission officially separated from the Diocese of Nanking to form the Apostolic Prefecture of Süchow, which was entrusted to the Canadian Jesuits. It was elevated to the Apostolic Vicariate of Süchow in 1935, with Philip Côté serving as the first bishop.

Under the direction of the Canadian Jesuits, the Cathedral of the Sacred Heart of Jesus was completed in 1910 and remains the city's principal church. By 1940, the vicariate reported 73,932 adherents. In 1941, the eastern portion of the vicariate was entrusted to the American Franciscans.

==== Protestantism ====
Protestant mission in Xuzhou began in 1886 with Alfred G. Jones of the Baptist Missionary Society (BMS), followed by the American Southern Presbyterian Mission in the 1890s. The mission established the Christian Hospital in 1900 and the Mary Ervin Rogers Memorial Hospital in 1914, which merged in 1940s as the precursor to the Affiliated Hospital of XZMU. They also founded the Julia Farrior Sanford Memorial School and Mary Stevens schools, which merged in 1931 as P'ei-cheng Middle School (now Xuzhou No. 5 Middle School). By the 1920s, the Southern Baptist Convention and Seventh-day Adventists had entered the city. In 1946, the North China Theological Seminary relocated from Tengzhou to Xuzhou, before moving to Wuxi in 1948.

== Landmarks ==
=== Han dynasty tombs ===
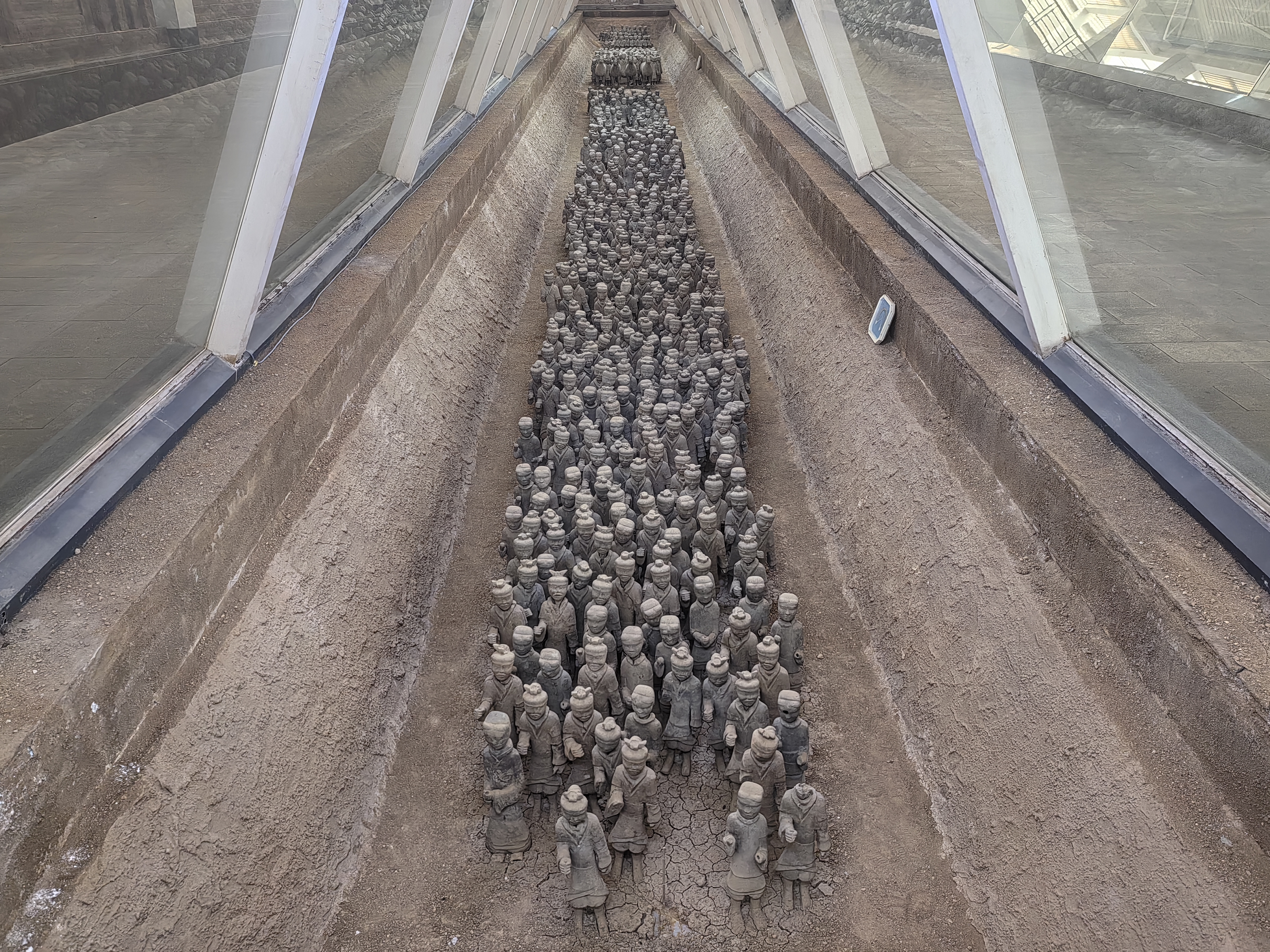
Terracotta Army at Shizishan

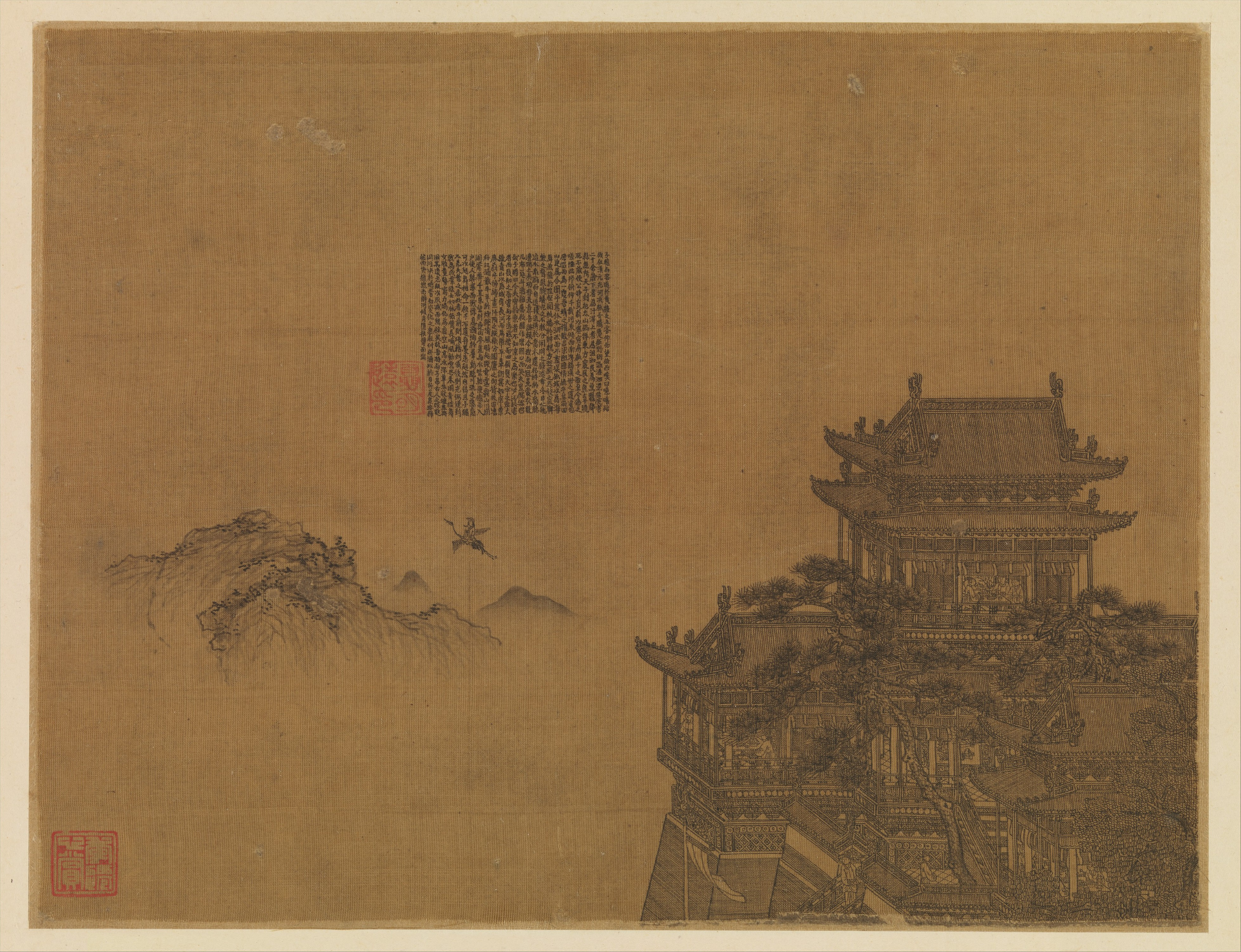
"The Yellow Pavilion" by Xia Yong, Yuan dynasty. Collection of the Metropolitan Museum of Art

=== Yellow Pavilion ===
The Yellow Pavilion (黃樓) was built in 1078 during Su Shi's tenure as the Prefect of Xuzhou to commemorate the completion of the city's wall fortification project under his leadership. The name "Yellow" carries a dual significance: it symbolically represents the element of earth, which conquers water and literally refers to the pounded earth (hangtu) used in the construction of the new defenses and the pavilion's foundation. The current structure is a reconstruction dating to 1988.

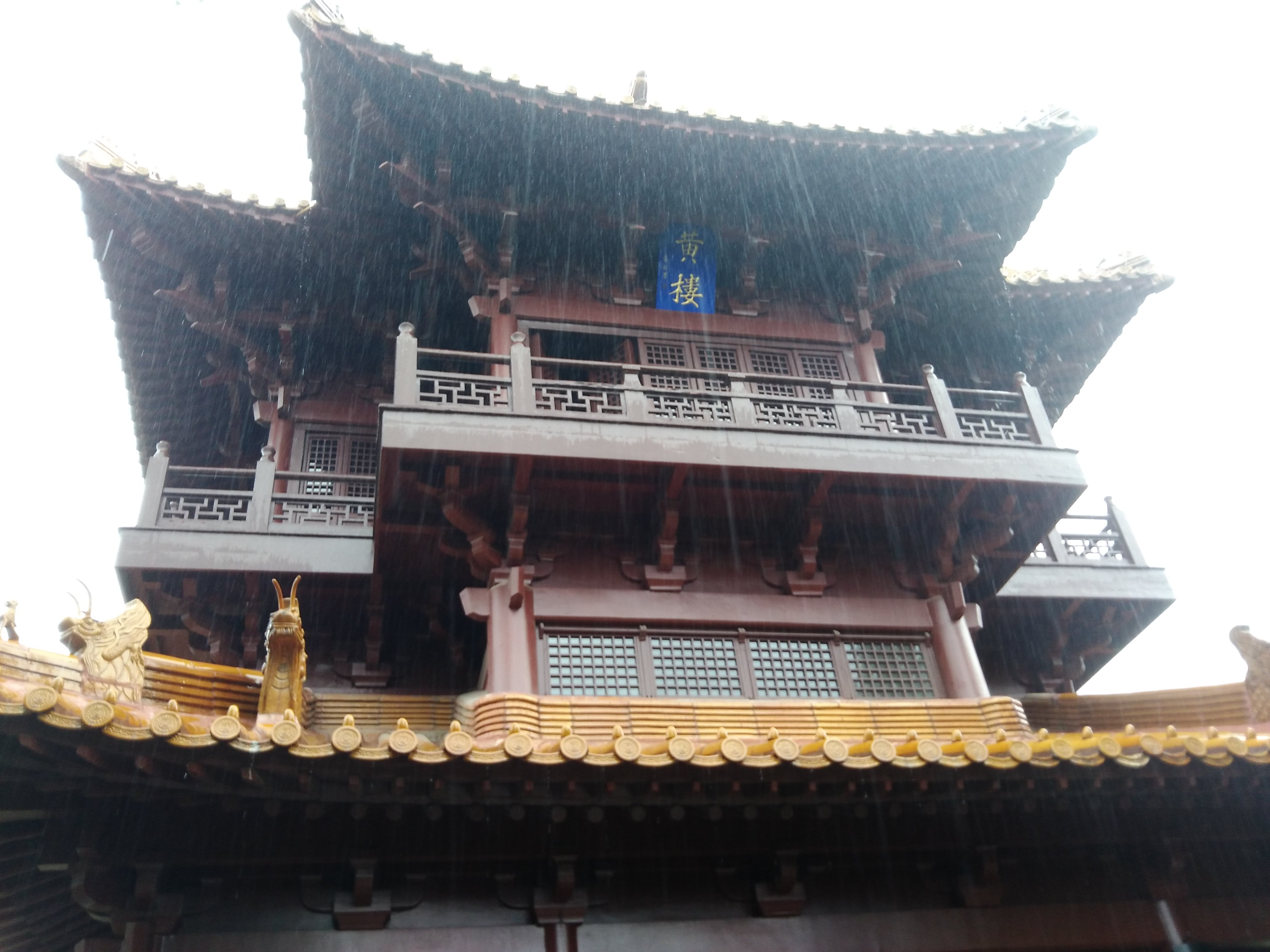
The Yellow Pavilion nowadays

== Transport ==
=== Roads ===
Xuzhou has many urban expressways: Xuzhou 3rd Ring Road expressways (east, north and west), Xuzhou East Ave. expressway (城东大道快速路), Xuzhou-Pantang expressway, Xuzhou-Jiawang expressway and Xuzhou-Suqian expressway etc.

==== Expressways ====
- G2 Beijing–Shanghai Expressway
- G2513 Huai'an–Xuzhou Expressway
- G3 Beijing–Taipei Expressway
- G30 Lianyungang–Khorgas Expressway
- S49 Xinyi–Yangzhou Expressway
- S65 Xuzhou–Mingguang Expressway
- S69 Jinan–Xuzhou Expressway

==== National Highways ====
- China National Highway 104
- China National Highway 205
- China National Highway 206
- China National Highway 311

=== Railways ===
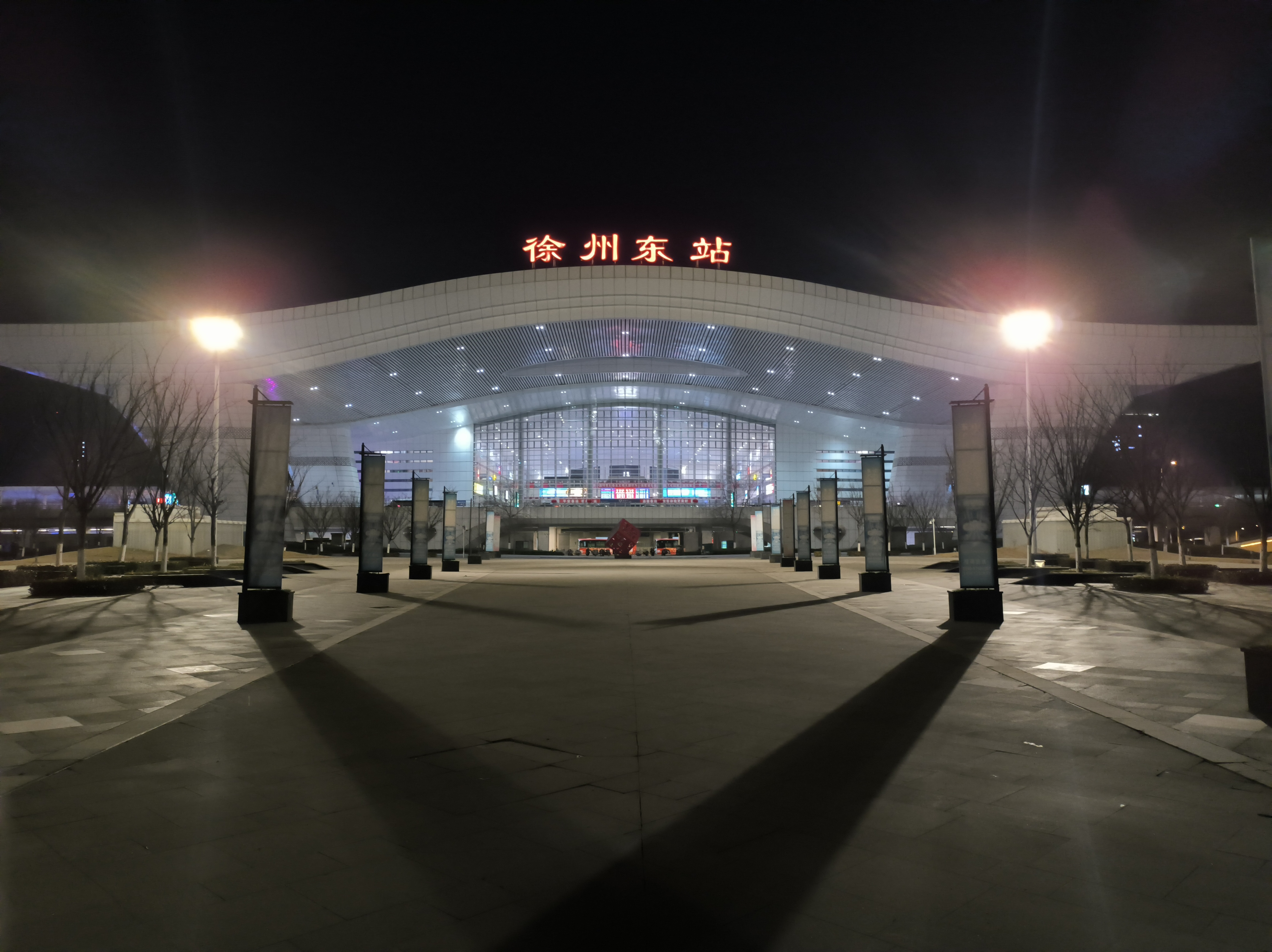
Xuzhoudong Railway Station East Hall

Xuzhou is a major railway hub in China. Xuzhou Railway Station is the junction of the Beijing–Shanghai and Lianyungang–Lanzhou (Longhai) railways. Xuzhoudong Railway Station, located in the east, serves as the interchange between the Beijing–Shanghai and Xuzhou–Lanzhou high-speed railways; it also functions as the terminal for the Xuzhou–Lanzhou, Xuzhou–Yancheng, and Lianyungang–Xuzhou lines. The two stations are linked via the Dahu connection line.

Xuzhoubei Railway Station, located in the north, is the largest marshalling yard of the China Railway Shanghai Group, handling over 20,000 wagons daily. As one of 14 designated China Railway Express assembly centers, Xuzhou maintains sea-rail intermodal connections to the ports of Ningbo-Zhoushan, Lianyungang, Yangshan, and Qingdao. In 2023, the annual rail freight volume reached 54.53 million tons.

=== Aviation ===
Xuzhou Guanyin International Airport is one of the three biggest international airports in Jiangsu Province, it serves the area with scheduled passenger flights to major airports in China. Xuzhou Guanyin International Airport (徐州观音国际机场) has two terminals until 2019. Domestic Terminal (Terminal 2) and International Terminal (Terminal 1).

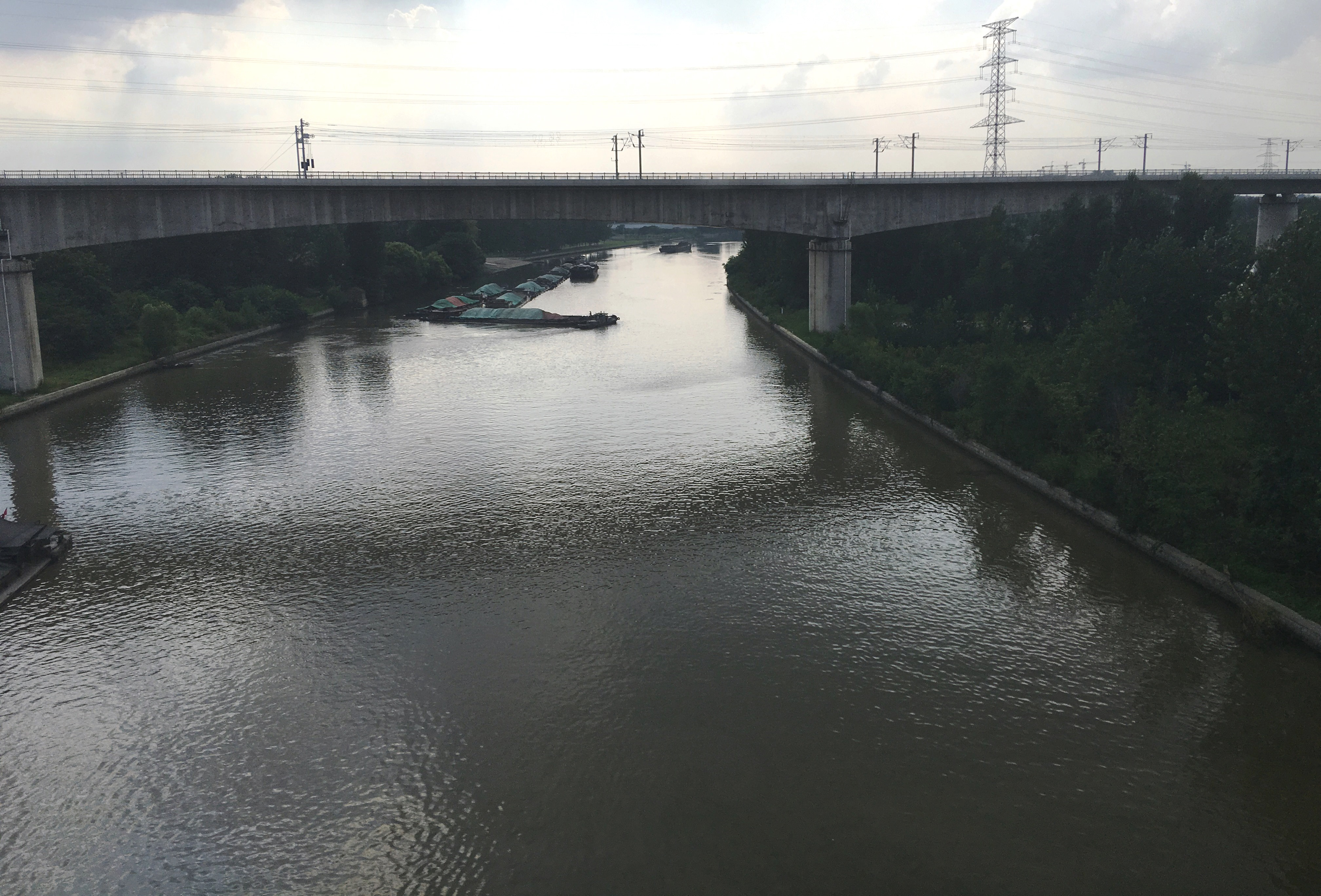
The Beijing-Shanghai Railway spans the Grand Canal at Xuzhou.

=== Metro System ===
Xuzhou is the first city in Northern Jiangsu to operate a rapid transit system.

==== Operational Lines ====
- Line 1 (Sep 2019): Xuzhoudong Railway Station – Luwo. Interchanges at Pengcheng Square (L2) and Xuzhou Railway Station (L3).
- Line 2 (Nov 2020): Keyunbei – Xinchengqudong. Serves JSNU Yunlong Campus.
- Line 3 (Jun 2021): Xiadian – Gaoxinqu'nan. Serves CUMT Wenchang Campus and JSNU Quanshan Campus.
- Line 6 (Sep 2025): Xuzhoudong Railway Station – Tongshan Chinese Medical Hospital.

=== Others ===
The Grand Canal flows through Xuzhou, and the navigation route extends from Jining to Hangzhou.

Luning oil pipeline, which originates from Linyi county of Shandong to Nanjing, passes through Xuzhou.

== Military ==
Xuzhou is headquarters of the 12th Group Army of the People's Liberation Army, one of the three group armies that compose the Nanjing Military Region responsible for the defense of China's eastern coast and possible military engagement with Taiwan. The People's Liberation Army Navy also has a Type 054A frigate that shares the name of the region.

== See also ==
- Battle of Xuzhou
- List of cities in the People's Republic of China by population
- List of twin towns and sister cities in China
- Xuzhou dialect

== General references ==
- Ji, Shijia (2008). 江苏省志・大事记（上） [Provincial Gazetteer of Jiangsu, Volume on Chronology, Part I: Prior to 1912] (PDF). Jiangsu Guji Press. ISBN 978-7-806-43321-8. Archived from the original (PDF) on 2021-12-04.
- Shan, Shumo; Ma, Xiangyong (1999). 江苏省志·地理志 [Provincial Gazetteer of Jiangsu, Volume on Geography] (PDF) (in Chinese). Jiangsu Guji Press. ISBN 978-7-806-43266-2. Archived from the original (PDF) on 2021-11-05.
- Twitchett, Denis; Loewe, Michael (1987). The Cambridge History of China, Volume 1: The Ch'in and Han Empires, 221 BC–AD 220. Cambridge University Press. ISBN 978-0-521-24327-8.
- Twitchett, Denis (2007). The Cambridge History of China, Volume 3: Sui and T'ang China, 589–906, Part 1. Cambridge University Press. ISBN 978-0-521-21446-9.
- Mote, Frederick W.; Twitchett, Denis (2007). The Cambridge History of China, Vol. 7: The Ming Dynasty, 1368-1644, Part 1. Cambridge University Press. ISBN 978-0-521-24332-2.
- Mote, Frederick W.; Twitchett, Denis (1998). The Cambridge History of China, Volume 8: The Ming Dynasty, 1368–1644, Part 2. Cambridge University Press. ISBN 978-0-521-24333-9.
- Perry, Elizabeth J. (1999). Rebels and revolutionaries in North China: 1845 - 1945. History Political science. Stanford, Calif: Stanford Univ. Press. ISBN 978-0-8047-1175-3.
- Xuzhou Gardens and Parks Records Compilation Committee (XZYLZ) (2016). Records of Xuzhou Gardens and Parks 徐州园林志 (in Chinese). Beijing: Fangzhi Publishing House. ISBN 978-7-5144-2044-9.
- Xuzhou Municipal Local History Compilation Committee (2017). Gazetteer of Xuzhou City: 1978–2005 徐州市志: 1978-2005 (in Chinese). Jiangsu People's Publishing House. ISBN 978-7-214-19707-8.
