= Diocese of Xuzhou =

Roman Catholic diocese in China

Diocese of Xuzhou Dioecesis Siuceuvensis 天主教徐州教区
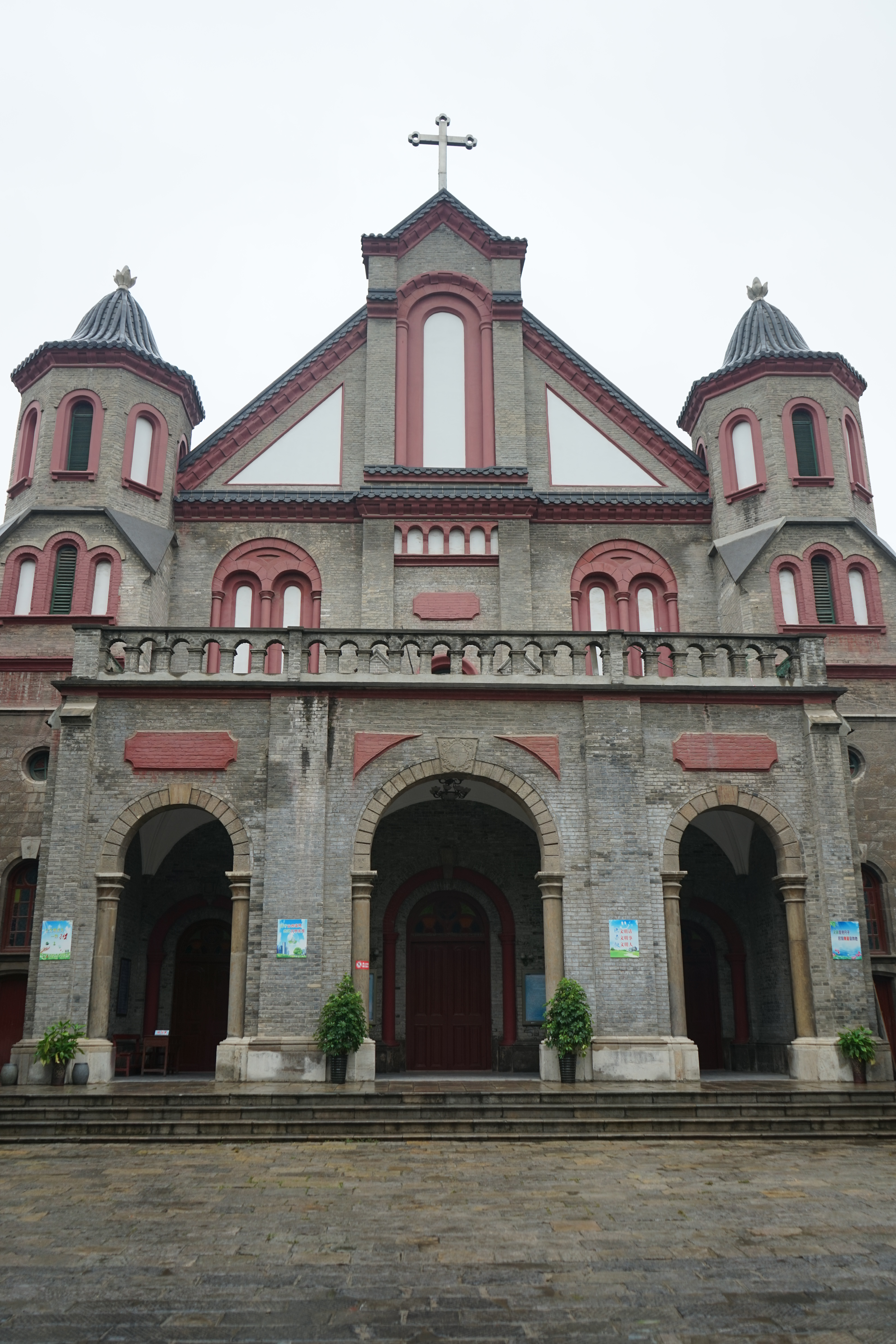
- Xuzhou Cathedral

Location
- Country: China
- Metropolitan: Nanjing

Statistics
- Area: 20,000 km^{2} (7,700 sq mi)
- Population: Total; Catholics: (as of 1950); 4,500,000; 93,500 (2.1%)

Information
- Rite: Latin Rite
- Cathedral: Cathedral of the Sacred Heart of Jesus in Xuzhou

Current leadership
- Pope: Leo XIV
- Bishop: Sede Vacante
- Metropolitan Archbishop: Francis Savio Lu Xinping

The Roman Catholic Diocese of Xuzhou/Süchow (Latin: Siuceuven(sis), Chinese: 徐州) is a diocese located in the city of Xuzhou (Jiangsu) in the ecclesiastical province of Nanjing in China.

== History ==
- July 1, 1931: Established as Apostolic Prefecture of Xuzhou 徐州 from the Apostolic Vicariate of Nanjing 南京
- June 18, 1935: Promoted as Apostolic Vicariate of Xuzhou 徐州
- April 11, 1946: Promoted as Diocese of Xuzhou 徐州

== Leadership ==
- Bishops of Xuzhou 徐州 (Roman rite)
  - Bishop Philip Côté, S.J. (April 11, 1946 – January 16, 1970)
  - Bishop John Wang Renlei (2011–present)
- Vicars Apostolic of Xuzhou 徐州 (Roman Rite)
  - Bishop Philip Côté, S.J. (June 18, 1935 – April 11, 1946)
