= Philip Côté =

American clergyman and bishop

Philip Côté SJ (December 28, 1895 – January 17, 1970) was an American clergyman and bishop for the Roman Catholic Diocese of Xuzhou.

Côté was born on December 28, 1895, in Lawrence, Massachusetts, U.S. He entered the Society of Jesus in 1916, was ordained as a priest in Montreal in 1927, soon departed for missionary work in China. He was appointed Titular Bishop of Polystylus in 1935, before subsequently being appointed Bishop of Xuzhou in 1946.

Firsthand witness to the Japanese invasion of China Fled to Taiwan at the end of the Chinese Civil War, he continued his missionary work through the region and later returned to mainland China participated as a Council Father at the Second Vatican Council, and died in Xuzhou in 1970.

He died on January 17, 1970, in Xuzhou, China.
