= John Wang Renlei =

- Bishop of the Roman Catholic Diocese of Xuzhou
- Church: Cathedral of the Sacred Heart of Jesus in Xuzhou
- Province: Shandong
- Diocese: Roman Catholic Diocese of Xuzhou
- Installed: 2011
- Predecessor: Thomasa Qian Yurong

Orders
- Ordination: 1996

Personal details
- Born: April 1970 (age 56) Weishan County, Shandong, China
- Denomination: Roman Catholic
- Education: National Seminary of Catholic Church in China

John Wang Renlei (Chinese: 王仁雷; pinyin: Wáng Rénléi; born April 1970) is a Chinese Catholic priest and the current bishop of the Roman Catholic Diocese of Xuzhou from 2011.

== Biography ==
Wang was born in Weishan County, Shandong, in April 1970, to a Catholic family. He is the third of three brothers. He graduated from the National Seminary of Catholic Church in China in May 1996. He was ordained a priest in August 1996. In August of the same year, Joseph Liu Yuanren, the former chairman of the Chinese Catholic Church and then Bishop of Nanjing Diocese, consecrated him as a priest. From August 1996 to January 2005, he served in the Fengxian Catholic Church. On November 30, 2006, he was elected Coadjutor bishop of the Roman Catholic Diocese of Xuzhou. In 2011 he became Bishop of the Roman Catholic Diocese of Xuzhou. At the beginning of 2012, he reconciled with the Holy See, which recognized him as the rightful Ordinary.

Catholic Church titles
Previous: Thomasa Qian Yurong	Bishop of the Roman Catholic Diocese of Xuzhou; 2011	Incumbent
