= John Wang (politician) =

Taiwanese politician

John Wang MLY
- 王政中

Member of the Legislative Yuan
- In office 1 February 2002 – 31 January 2005
- Constituency: Overseas Chinese

Personal details
- Born: 10 October 1962 (age 63)
- Party: Taiwan Solidarity Union
- Education: University of Southern California (BA)

Wang Cheng-chung (Chinese: 王政中; born 10 October 1962), also known by his English name John Wang, is a Taiwanese politician. A member of the Taiwan Solidarity Union, he served one term on the Legislative Yuan, representing overseas Chinese between 2002 and 2005.

== Early life and education ==
Wang's father Kenjohn was the founding leader of the Taiwanese American Foundation. John Wang was raised in the United States and earned his bachelor's degree from the University of Southern California.

== Career ==
As a legislator, Wang took an interest in foreign affairs, and took several trips abroad. He traveled to the United States to discuss Taiwan's inclusion in the World Trade Organization and the aftermath of the 2003 invasion of Iraq. Wang also visited Switzerland to advocate for Taiwan's inclusion in the World Health Assembly. Within the Legislative Yuan, Wang took active roles in the Taiwan–USA Parliamentary Amity Association, and the Taiwan–France Parliamentary Amity Association. In September 2002, the legislature issued a non-binding resolution against the use of foreign languages during interpellation, shortly after Wang had questioned Premier Yu Shyi-kun in English.
