= Bazirou =

Pork dish from Shandong, China

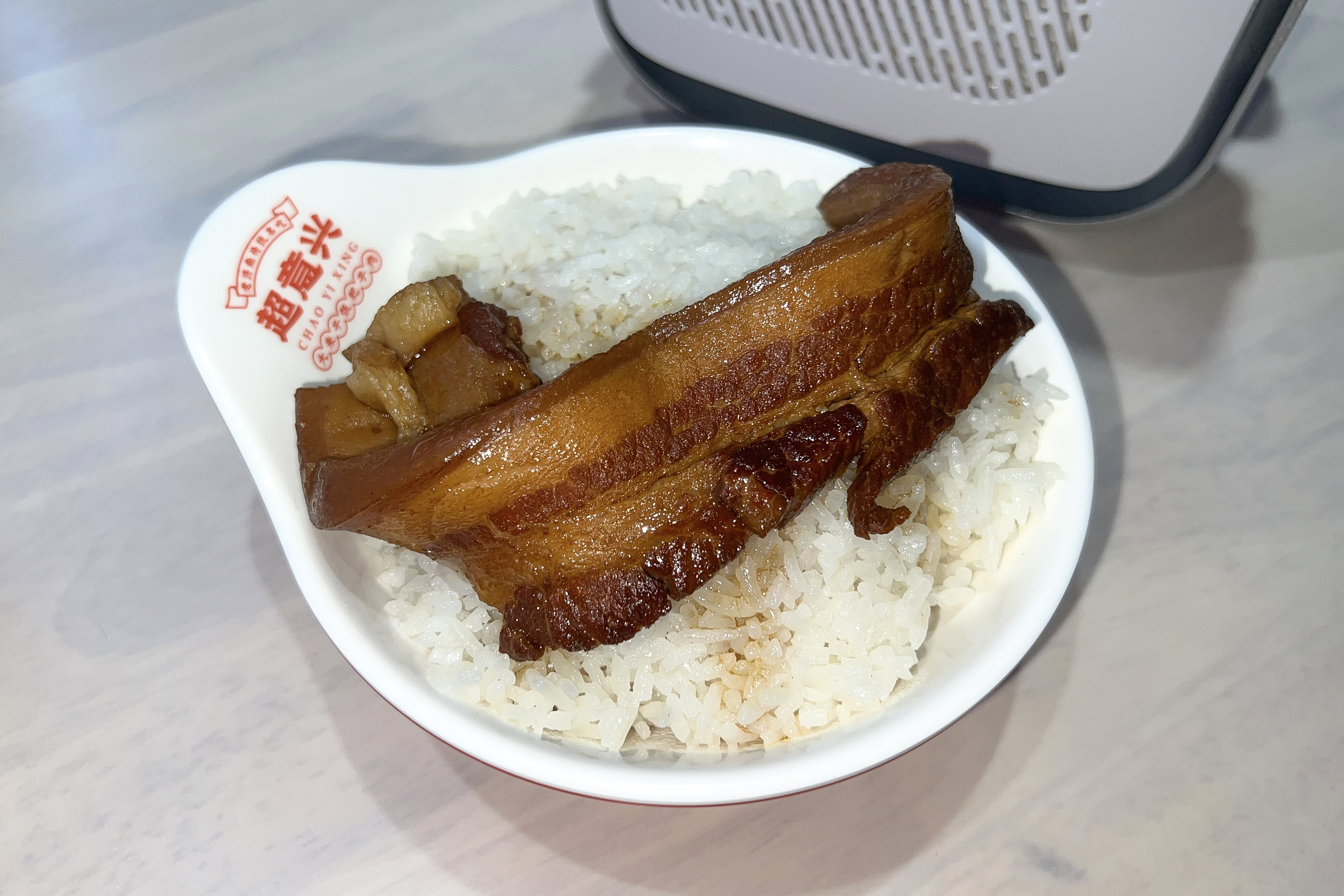
Bazirou over rice

Bazirou (Chinese: 把子肉; pinyin: Bǎzǐ ròu), or Bazirou pork, is a classic meat dish from Shandong, known for its bold flavor and rustic presentation. The name literally means "handful pork", referring to the long, baton-like strips of pork belly that can be grasped by hand. Unlike many braised pork dishes in China that cut the meat into small cubes, Bazirou preserves the meat in large pieces, giving it a primal, substantial character.

== Overview ==
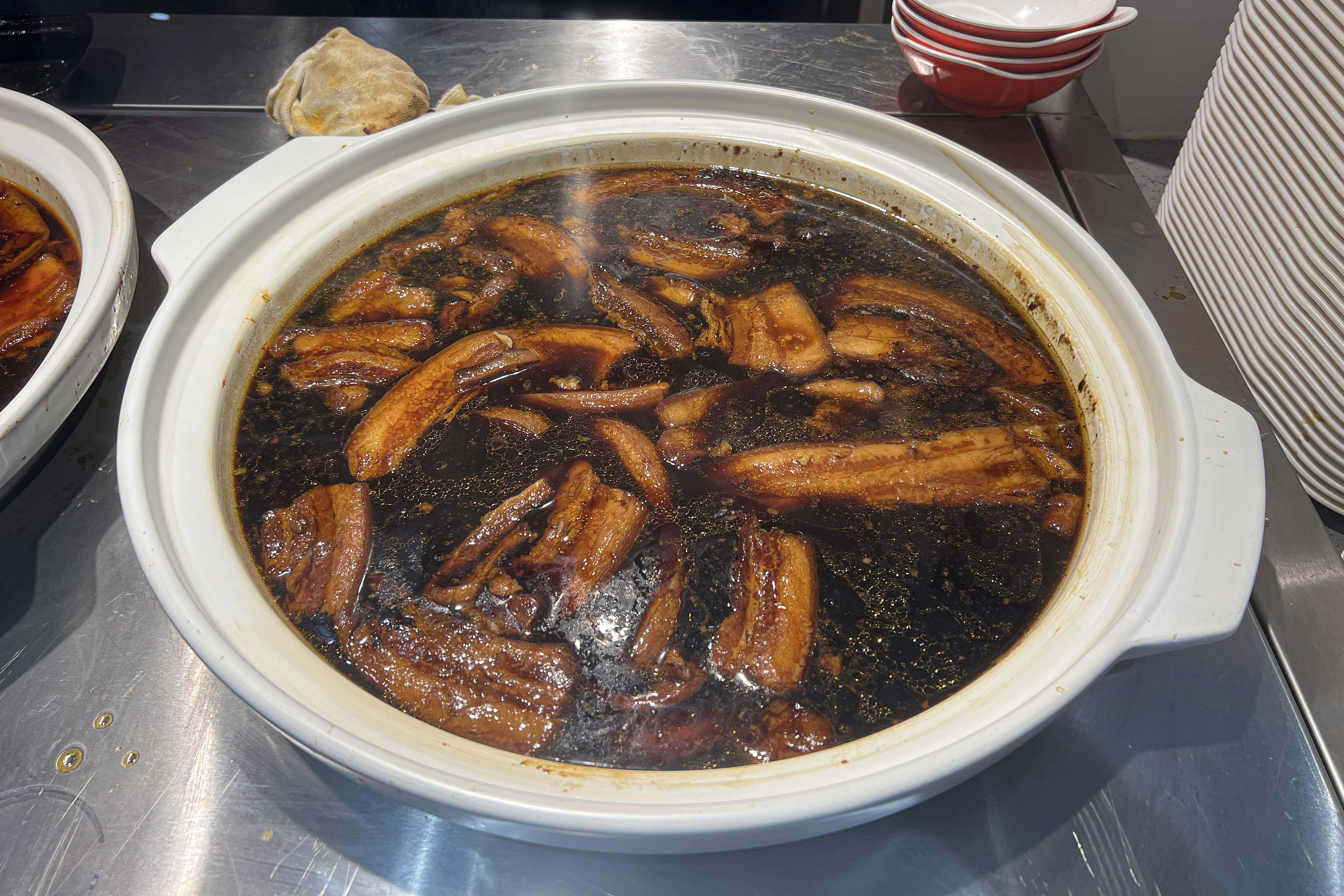
A pot of Bazirou

The preparation typically begins by blanching or searing the pork to tighten the skin and seal in juices, followed by slow braising in a mixture of soy sauce, onion, ginger, garlic, star anise, and other spices. The result is pork that is deeply infused with savory, umami-rich flavor, tender enough to fall apart with gentle pressure, yet firm enough to maintain its shape when served. The emphasis is on salty robustness rather than sweetness, a defining trait of Shandong cuisine, which traditionally favors intense, straightforward flavors.

Bazirou is most commonly enjoyed as a comforting everyday food rather than fine dining, often paired with steamed buns, flatbread, or simply ladled over a bowl of white rice to make a quintessential northern-style comfort meal. Its origins are closely associated with the cities of Jinan and Zibo, where generations of local cooks have preserved and transmitted the dish as part of Shandong’s culinary identity.
