= Christianity in Henan =

Henan province of China has one of the largest Christian populations of East Asia. There are believed to be several million Christians in Henan, most of them attending Chinese house churches. Henan is thought to have one of the most significant proportions of Christians of any Chinese province. Henan has one of the largest Protestant populations of the country. Many Protestants of Henan live in rural areas. On August 6, 2004, a hundred house church members were arrested in Henan. During the Boxer Rebellion, Christians were killed in Henan. The Henan Mission, up to 1925 of the Presbyterian Church of Canada, was founded in 1888. The Shouters are active in the province. There is persecution of Christians. Bishop Li Hongye was arrested in Luoyang in 2001. A Henan Bible School exists.

== Roman Catholic dioceses with seat in Henan ==
- Roman Catholic Archdiocese of Kaifeng
- Roman Catholic Diocese of Luoyang
- Roman Catholic Diocese of Nanyang
- Roman Catholic Diocese of Weihui
- Roman Catholic Diocese of Xinyang
- Roman Catholic Diocese of Zhengzhou

== See also ==
- Chinese Rites controversy
- List of Re-education Through Labor camps in China
- Kaifeng Jews
- Christianity in Henan's neighbouring provinces
  - Christianity in Anhui
  - Christianity in Hebei
  - Christianity in Shaanxi
  - Christianity in Shandong
