= Aiadava =

Ancient Dacian fortified settlement

- Aiadaba, Aeadaba
- Location within Serbia
- 43.2180°N 22.3074°E
- Location: Bela Palanka, Serbia

Aiadava (Aiadaba or Aeadaba, Greek: Αἰάδαβα) was a Dacian town in the Remesiana region, present day Bela Palanka, Serbia.

After the Romans conquered Moesia in the 75 BC, the new castrum (imperial domain with estates) and municipium was known initially as Ulpianorum and then Remesiana (Moesi) and laid on the Via Militaris road, between Naissus and Serdica.

Emperor Justinian (r. 527–565) had following strongholds in the district of Remesiana:

Brittura Subaras Lamponiana Stronges Dalmatas Primiana Phrerraria Topera Tomes Cuas Tzertzenutzas Stens Aeadaba Destreba Pretzouries Cumudeba Deurias Lutzolo Rhepordenes Spelonca Scumbro Briparo Tulcoburgo Longiana Lupophantana Dardapara Burdomina Grinciapana Graecus Drasimarca

The patron saint of Romania, Nicetas of Remesiana, was a 4th-century bishop at Remesiana, of possible Dacian descent.

Excavations include well-preserved castrum dating to 4th century, a hoard of 260 coins minted during the rule of Constantine I, Theodosius I, Tiberius Claudius Nero.

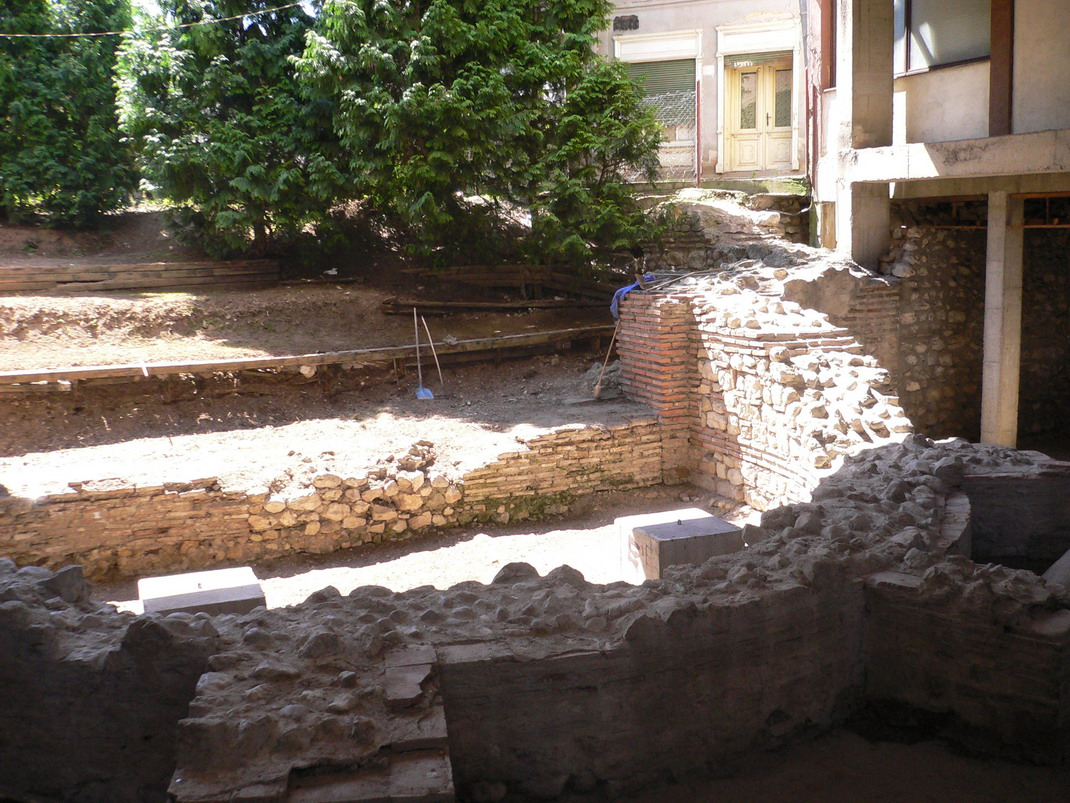
Basilica Apse under excavation in Remesiana. Basilica is found under modern residential building.

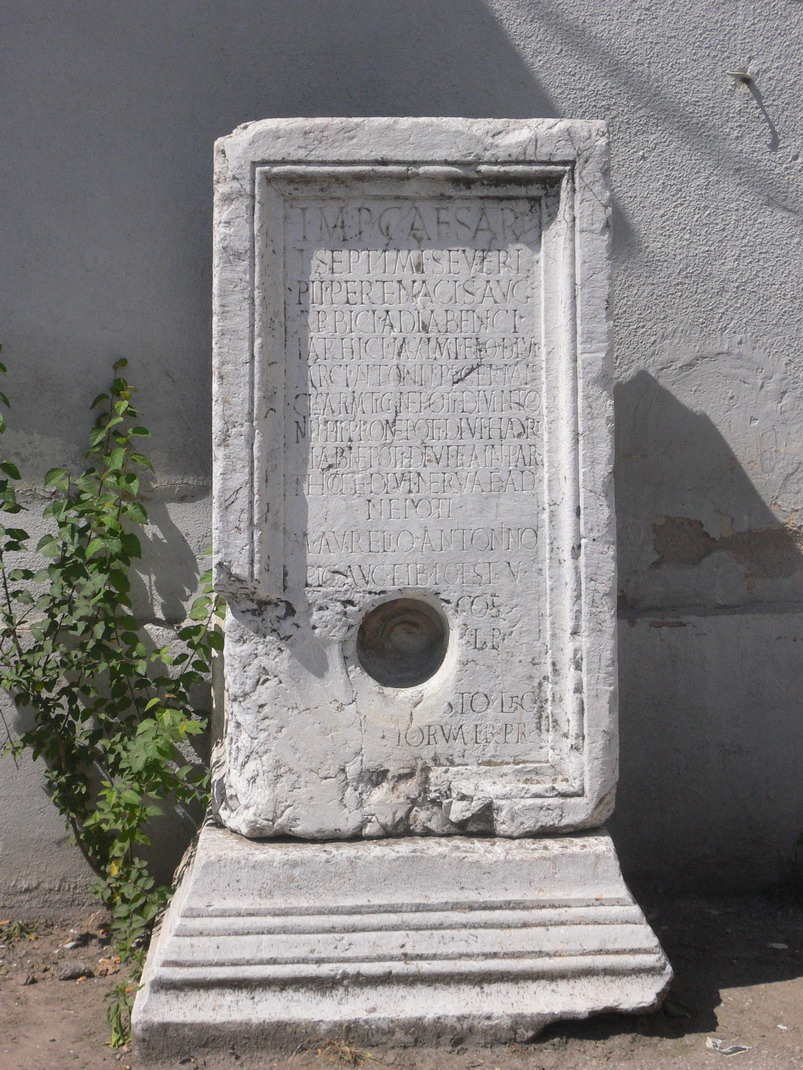
3rd century Septimius Severus monument in Bela Palanka.

== See also ==
- Dacia
- List of ancient cities in Thrace and Dacia
- Archaeological Sites of Great Importance (Serbia)
- Remesiana
