= Christianity in Anhui =

Anhui province of China has one of the largest Christian populations of regions of East Asia. It includes millions of people. According to surveys conducted in 2007 and 2009, 5.30% of the population identifies as Christian. Christianity in Henan is one of the largest Christian populations in East Asia as well. The Shouters are active in the province. The defunct Apostolic Vicariate of Kiang-nan had a long history. The country has Persecution of Christians. Watchman Nee died a martyr in an Anhui labour-camp in 1972.

== Roman Catholic dioceses with seat in Anhui ==
- Roman Catholic Archdiocese of Anqing
- Roman Catholic Diocese of Bengbu
- Roman Catholic Diocese of Wuhu

== See also ==
- Beili Wang
- Zhushenjiao
- Christianity in Anhui's neighbouring provinces
  - Christianity in Henan
  - Christianity in Jiangsu
  - Christianity in Jiangxi
  - Christianity in Shandong
  - Christianity in Zhejiang
