= Joseph Jin Dechen =

- Bishop Emeritus of the Roman Catholic Diocese of Nanyang
- Church: Cathedral of St Joseph in Nanyang
- Province: Kaifeng
- Diocese: Roman Catholic Diocese of Nanyang
- Installed: 1981
- Term ended: 2011
- Predecessor: Pietro Massa
- Successor: Joseph Zhu Baoyu

Orders
- Ordination: 1944

Personal details
- Born: June 19, 1919 China
- Died: November 21, 2002 (aged 83) China
- Denomination: Roman Catholic

Joseph Jin Dechen (Chinese: 靳德辰; pinyin: Jìn Déchén; June 19, 1919 – November 21, 2002) was a Chinese Catholic priest and Bishop Emeritus of the Roman Catholic Diocese of Nanyang.

== Biography ==
He was ordained a priest in 1944. In 1958, he was arrested for the first time and sentenced to life in prison. This sentence was settled and he was released in 1973. In December 1981, when he was Bishop Emeritus in Roman Catholic Diocese of Nanyang, he was again arrested, charged with resistance to abortion and birth control, and was sentenced to 15 years of prison and five years of subsequent loss of political rights on July 27, 1982. He was detained in the Third Province Prison in Yu County (now Yuzhou), near Zhengzhou in Henan, and was pardoned and released in May 1992 and ordered to stay in his village Jinjiajiang, near Nanyang. He was out of weakness when he was released from prison.

Catholic Church titles
| Previous: Pietro Massa | Bishop Emeritus of the Roman Catholic Diocese of Nanyang; 1981–2011 | Succeeded by Joseph Zhu Baoyu |
