= Joseph Zhu =

Joseph Zhu may refer to:

- Joseph Zhu Huayu (1918–2005), Chinese Roman Catholic bishop in Anhui
- Joseph Zhu Baoyu (1921–2020), Chinese Roman Catholic bishop in Henan
