= Diocese of Zhumadian =

Roman Catholic diocese in China

Diocese of Zhumadian Dioecesis Ciumatienensis 天主教驻马店教区

Location
- Country: China
- Ecclesiastical province: Kaifeng
- Metropolitan: Kaifeng

Statistics
- Area: 12,700 km^{2} (4,900 sq mi)
- Population: Total; Catholics: (as of 1950); 1,300,000; 14,100 (1.1%)

Information
- Rite: Latin Rite

Current leadership
- Pope: Leo XIV
- Bishop: Sede Vacante
- Metropolitan Archbishop: Joseph Gao Hongxiao

The Roman Catholic Diocese of Zhumadian/Chumatien (Latin: Ciumatienen(sis), Chinese: 駐馬店) is a diocese located in the city of Zhumadian (Henan) in the ecclesiastical province of Kaifeng in China.

== History ==
- March 2, 1933: Established as the Apostolic Prefecture of Zhumadian 駐馬店 from the Apostolic Vicariate of Nanyangfu 南陽府 and the Apostolic Prefecture of Xinyangzhou 信陽州
- November 9, 1944: Promoted as Apostolic Vicariate of Zhumadian 駐馬店
- April 11, 1946: Promoted as Diocese of Zhumadian 駐馬店

== Leadership ==
- Bishops of Zhumadian 駐馬店 (Roman rite)
  - Bishop Joseph Mary Yuan Ke-zhi (Yüen K’ai-chih) (袁克治) (April 11, 1946 – January 30, 1969)
- Vicars Apostolic of Zhumadian 駐馬店 (Roman Rite)
  - Bishop Joseph Mary Yuan Ke-zhi (Yüen K’ai-chih) (袁克治) (November 9, 1944 – April 11, 1946)
- Prefects Apostolic of Zhumadian 駐馬店 (Roman Rite)
  - Fr. Joseph Mary Yuan Ke-zhi (Yüen K’ai-chih) (袁克治) (later Bishop) (1939 – November 9, 1944)
  - Fr. Peter Wang (August 4, 1933 – 1938)
