= Joseph Liu =

Joseph Liu may refer to:

- Joseph Liu Yuanren (1923–2005), Chinese Roman Catholic bishop
- Joseph Liu Xinhong (born 1964), Chinese Roman Catholic bishop
- Joseph P. Liu, legal scholar and professor at Boston College Law School
- Joseph T. C. Liu, engineer and professor at Brown University

== See also ==
- Joseph Lau (born 1951), Hong Kong billionaire, felon and fugitive
