= Taddeo Wang Yuesheng =

Chinese prelate

Most Reverend Taddeo Wang Yuesheng
- Bishop of Zhengzhou
- Native name: 王跃胜
- Church: Catholic Church
- Diocese: Diocese of Zhengzhou
- Appointed: 16 December 2023

Orders
- Consecration: 25 January 2024

Personal details
- Born: 27 February 1966 (age 60) Zhumadian, Henan, China

Taddeo Wang Yuesheng (also known as Thaddeus Wang Yuesheng; Chinese: 王躍勝; born 27 February 1966) is a Chinese prelate of the Catholic Church who has been bishop of the Diocese of Zhengzhou since January 2024. He has been a priest since 1993.

== Biography ==
Taddeo Wang Yuesheng was born in Zhumadian in the province of Henan on 27 February 1966. He studied philosophy and theology at the Centre South Seminary from 1987 to 1993 and was ordained a priest in Hankou on 17 October 1993. He has worked as a parish priest in Zhengzhou, since December 2011 in the District of Huiji there.

He has been president of the Henan Patriotic Association since 2011.

On 16 December 2023, Pope Francis appointed him bishop of Zhengzhou, in accordance with the procedures established by the Provisional Agreement between the Holy See and the People's Republic of China, dated 22 September 2018. (Note: The Provisional Agreement was valid for two years. It was renewed in 2020 and 2022. It has eased but not eliminated friction between the parties.) Wang Yuesheng received his episcopal consecration on 25 January 2024 in Our Lady of Lourdes Church, Zhengzhou City, from Joseph Shen Bin, Bishop of Shanghai and President of the Catholic Patriotic Association, with co-consecrators Joseph Zhang Yinlin, Bishop of Jixian, and Joseph Yang Yongqiang, Bishop of Zhoucon.

In 2020 and 2023 he was elected as member of the 13th and 14th Chinese People's Political Consultative Conferences.

He was the sixth bishop consecrated in China since the Provisional Agreement of 2018 and the first since September 2021. He is the first resident bishop in Zhengzhou in over 70 years. (Note: The preceding bishop of Zhengzhou Faustino Tissot (1901–1991), a native of Trent, Italy, was expelled from China on 12 November 1953.)

== See also ==
- China–Holy See relations
