= Diocese of Zhengzhou =

Roman Catholic diocese in China

Diocese of Zhengzhou Dioecesis Cemceuvensis 天主教郑州教区

Location
- Country: China
- Ecclesiastical province: Kaifeng
- Metropolitan: Kaifeng

Statistics
- Area: 18,000 km^{2} (6,900 sq mi)
- Population: Total; Catholics: (as of 1950); 4,000,000; 20,514 (0.5%)

Information
- Rite: Latin Rite

Current leadership
- Pope: Leo XIV
- Bishop: Taddeo Wang Yuesheng

The Roman Catholic Diocese of Zhengzhou/Chengchow (Latin: Cemceuven(sis), Chinese: 鄭州) is a diocese located in the city of Zhengzhou in the ecclesiastical province of Kaifeng in China.

== History ==
- August 28, 1882: Established as the Apostolic Prefecture of Western Honan 河南西境 from the Apostolic Vicariate of Honan 河南
- May 2, 1911: Promoted as Apostolic Vicariate of Western Honan 河南西境
- December 3, 1924: Renamed as Apostolic Vicariate of Zhengzhou 鄭州
- April 11, 1946: Promoted as Diocese of Zhengzhou 鄭州

== Leadership ==
Vicars Apostolic of Western Honan 河南西境

- Bishop Luigi Calza, S.X. (23 June 1906 – 18 September 1911)

Vicars Apostolic of Zhengzhou 鄭州

- Bishop Luigi Calza, S.X. (18 September 1911 – 22 October 1944)

Bishops of Zhengzhou 鄭州

- Faustino M. Tissot, S.X. (10 May 1946 – 1983)
- Taddeo Wang Yuesheng, 58 (25 January 2024 – present)
