= Christianity in Jiangsu =

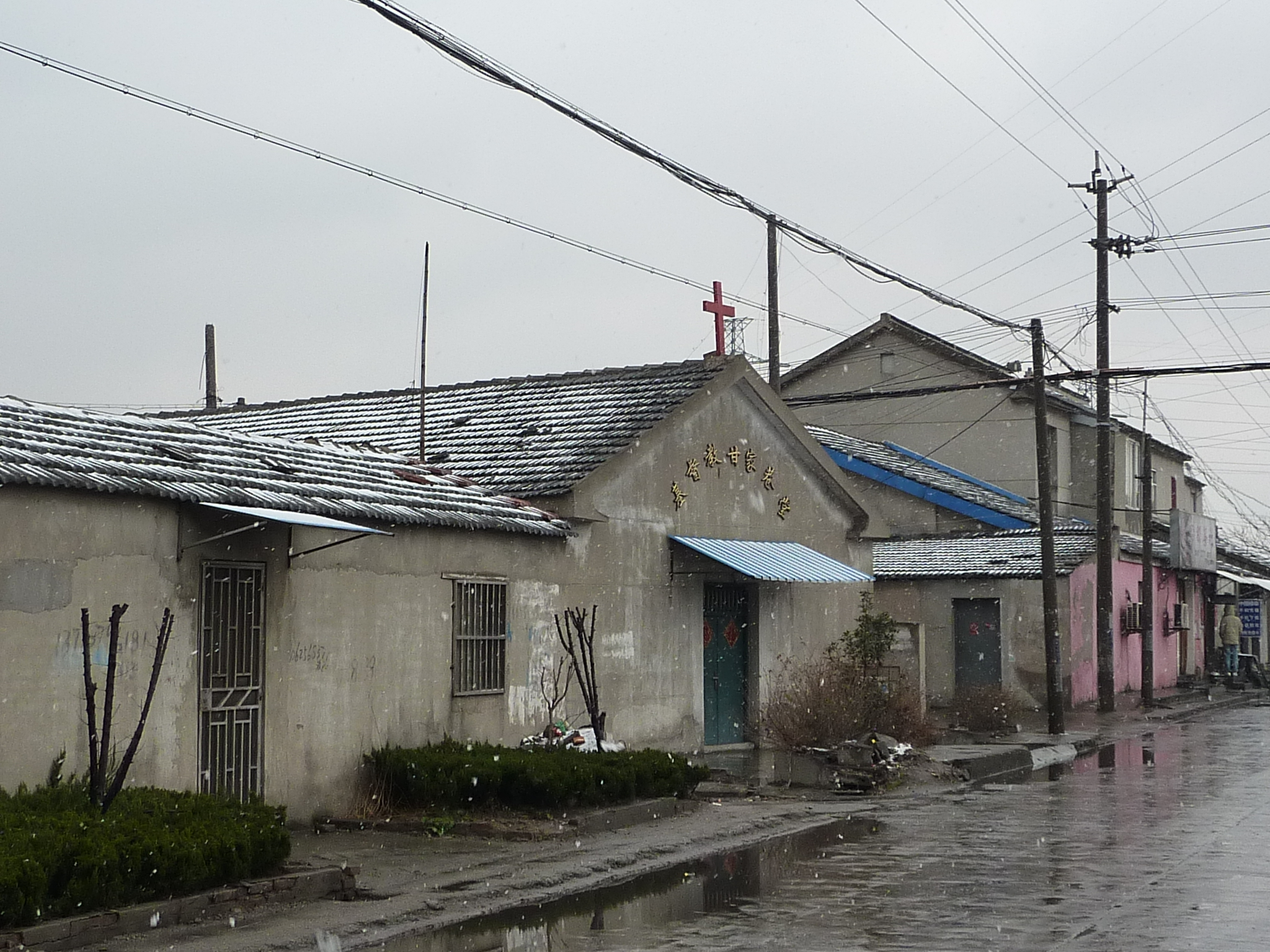
A small church in Ganjiaxiang, a workers' neighborhood on the outskirts of Nanjing

Christianity is a minority religion in Jiangsu province of China. Elsewhere in China, Christians are found in significant numbers in Henan, in Anhui and in Shandong.

The number of Christians in Jiangsu has been estimated at 125,000 for 1985, at 250,000 for 1988, at 400,000 for 1989, at 640,000 for 1991 and at 900,000 for 1995 according to Religious Affairs Bureau of Jiangsu Province. These figures possibly are underestimates. The country has persecution of Christians.

Amity Foundation, its general secretary being Qiu Zhonghui, has its seat in Nanjing.

== History ==
Presence of Christians in Jiangsu has been attested as early as the 14th century (see Caterina Vilioni), but when the Jesuit missionaries reached the province in the late 16th century, they were not able to find any Christians there. Matteo Ricci himself was based in Nanjing for a while, and since then the province had a significant missionary presence, not always entirely welcome by the local population (see e.g. the Yangzhou riot of 1868).

During the Taiping Rebellion, Jiangsu was partly controlled by the rebels, who established their capital in Nanjing, and whose ideology was significantly influenced by Christianity.

== Roman Catholic dioceses with seat in Jiangsu ==
- Roman Catholic Archdiocese of Nanking
- Roman Catholic Diocese of Haimen
- Roman Catholic Diocese of Suzhou
- Roman Catholic Diocese of Xuzhou

== See also ==
- Spirit Church
- Christianity in Jiangsu's neighbouring provinces
  - Christianity in Anhui
  - Christianity in Shandong
  - Christianity in Shanghai
  - Christianity in Zhejiang
- zh:Category:江苏基督教 (The corresponding Category in Chinese Wikipedia)
