= Diocese of Weihui =

Roman Catholic diocese in China

Diocese of Weihui Dioecesis Ueihoeivensis 天主教卫辉教区

Location
- Country: China
- Ecclesiastical province: Kaifeng
- Metropolitan: Kaifeng

Statistics
- Population: Total; Catholics: (as of 1950); 2,500,000; 46,000 (1.8%)

Information
- Rite: Latin Rite
- Cathedral: Cathedral in Anyang

Current leadership
- Pope: Leo XIV
- Metropolitan Archbishop: Joseph Gao Hongxiao
- Coadjutor: Joseph Zhang Yinlin

The Roman Catholic Diocese of Weihui/Weíhwei/Jixian (Latin: Ueihoeiven(sis), Chinese: 衛輝, 級縣) is a diocese located in the city of Weihui in the ecclesiastical province of Kaifeng in China.

== History ==
- 1869: Established as Apostolic Vicariate of Northern Honan 河南北境 from the Apostolic Vicariate of Honan 河南
- August 2, 1929: Renamed as Apostolic Vicariate of Weihuifu 衛輝府
- April 11, 1946: Promoted as Diocese of Weihui 衛輝

== Leadership ==
- Bishops of Weihui 衛輝 (Roman rite)
  - Bishop Joseph Zhang Yinlin (2016 - )
  - Bishop Thomas Zhang Huai-xin (1981 - 2016)
  - Bishop Mario Civelli, P.I.M.E. (祁济众) (July 18, 1946 – February 2, 1966)
- Vicars Apostolic of Northern Honan 河南北境 (Roman Rite)
  - Bishop Martino Chiolino, P.I.M.E. (林栋臣) (February 23, 1921 – 1929)
  - Bishop Giovanni Menicatti, P.I.M.E. (梅占魁) (September 12, 1903 – 1919)
  - Bishop Giovanni Domenico Rizzolati, O.F.M. (August 30, 1839 – 1856)
