= Joseph Zhu Huayu =

Chinese bishop

- Bishop of Bengbu
- Native name: 朱化宇
- Church: Bengbu Cathedral
- Province: Anhui
- Diocese: Roman Catholic Diocese of Bengbu
- Installed: 1986
- Term ended: 2001
- Predecessor: Zhou Yi-zhai
- Successor: Liu Xinhong

Orders
- Ordination: 1947

Personal details
- Born: 1918 Xingtai, Hebei, China
- Died: February 26, 2005 (aged 86–87) Bengbu, Anhui, China
- Denomination: Roman Catholic

Chinese name
- Chinese: 朱化宇
Transcriptions
Standard Mandarin
- Hanyu Pinyin: Zhū Huàyǔ

Joseph Zhu Huayu (Chinese: 朱化宇; 1918 – 26 February 2005) was a Chinese priest, bishop of the Catholic Patriotic Association, recognized by the state authorities of the People's Republic of China, while remaining without communication with the Vatican.

== Biography ==
Zhu was born in Xingtai, Hebei, in 1918. He was ordained in 1947. He worked as a priest. The years 1966-1976 (Cultural Revolution) he forced to work in the fields instead of spreading Catholicism. From 1981, he worked as a pastor in the province of Anhui. In 1986 he became the bishop of Bengbu. After the administrative changes of the diocese (made by the state authorities), he headed the new diocese of Anhui (2001), covering the entire province, and the merger of the existing dioceses of Bengbu, Anqing and Wuhu and the Tunxi Apostolic Prefecture.

Catholic Church titles
Previous: Zhou Yi-zhai	Bishop of Bengbu; 1986-2001	Next: Liu Xinhong (刘新红)
