= Francis R. Reiss =

American prelate of the Catholic Church (born 1940)

His Excellency, The Most Reverend Francis Ronald Reiss J.C.L.
- Auxiliary Bishop Emeritus of Detroit; Titular Bishop of Remesiana
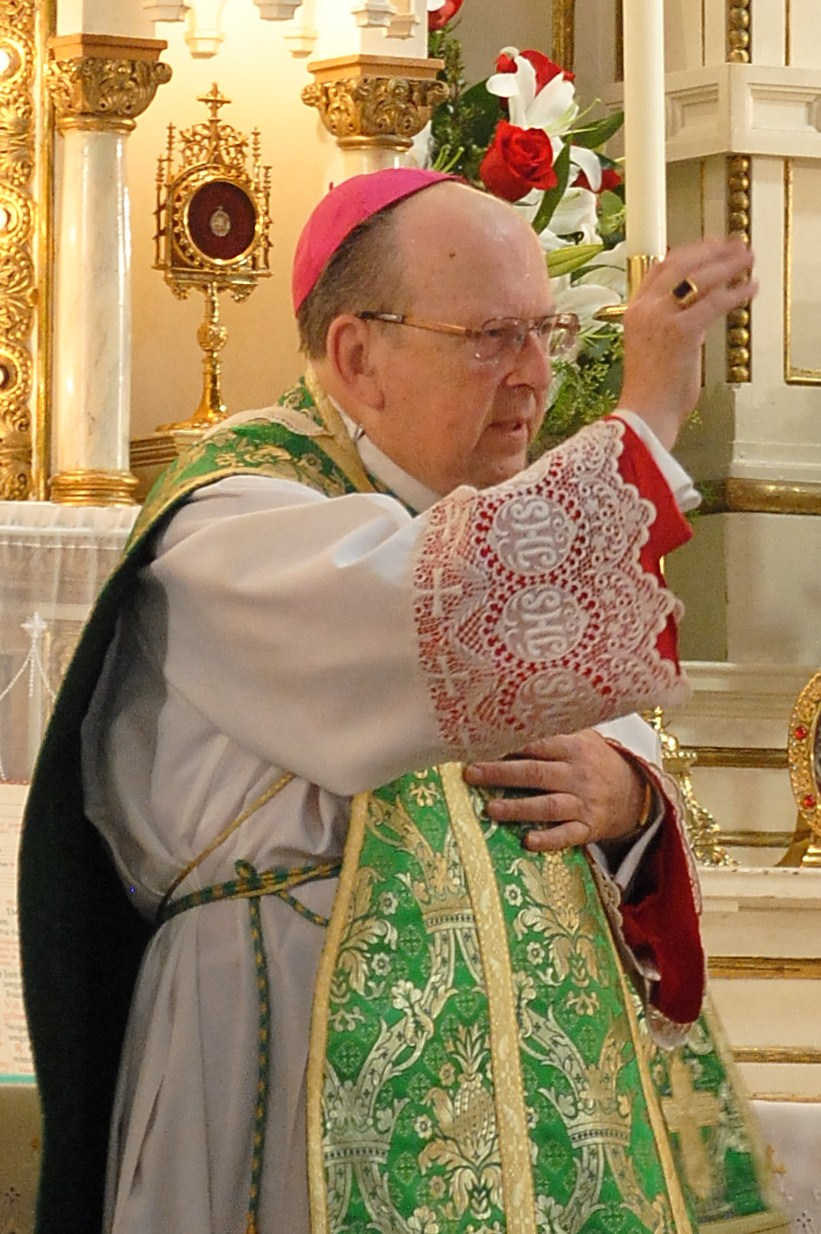
- Bishop Reiss giving the blessing after pontifical low mass on August 12, 2012.
- Archdiocese: Archdiocese of Detroit
- Appointed: July 7, 2003
- Installed: August 12, 2003
- Retired: November 11, 2015
- Other post: Titular Bishop of Remesiana

Orders
- Ordination: June 4, 1966 by John Dearden
- Consecration: August 12, 2003 by Adam Cardinal Maida, Edmund Szoka, and Walter Joseph Schoenherr

Personal details
- Born: November 11, 1940 (age 85) Detroit, Michigan, US
- Denomination: Catholic Church
- Education: University of Detroit; St. John Provincial Seminary; Pontifical Gregorian University
- Motto: In Christo omnia (All things in Christ)

Styles of Francis Ronald Reiss
- Reference style: His Excellency; The Most Reverend
- Spoken style: Your Excellency
- Religious style: Bishop

Francis Ronald Reiss (born November 11, 1940) is an American prelate of the Roman Catholic Church. He served as an auxiliary bishop of the Archdiocese of Detroit in Michigan from 2003 to 2015.

== Biography ==
=== Early life ===
Francis Reiss was born on November 11, 1940, in Hamtramck, Michigan, to Joseph and Emily Reiss. The oldest of the three children, he has a sister, Sandra, and a brother, John. Reiss attended St. Stephen Elementary School and St. Andrew High School in Detroit. He then entered Sacred Heart Seminary in Detroit, where he obtained a Bachelor of Arts degree in philosophy in 1962. Reiss then studied at St. John Provincial Seminary in Plymouth. Michigan.

=== Priesthood ===
Reiss was ordained to the priesthood for the Archdiocese of Detroit by Archbishop John Dearden on June 4, 1966. He did his postgraduate studies at the University of Detroit, earning a Master of Religious Studies degree (1972) and a Master of Education degree (1973). He also received a Master of Divinity degree from St. John Provincial Seminary in 1974, and a Licentiate of Canon Law from the Pontifical Gregorian University in Rome in 1984.

Reiss served as campus minister at the University of Michigan and at Henry Ford Community College in Dearborn, Michigan. He served later as dean of admissions and academic dean of the School of Theology at Sacred Heart Seminary. He also served as defender of the bond on the Archdiocesan Metropolitan Tribunal, director of the Archdiocesan Department of Education, and archdiocesan vicar of the Southland Vicariate.

Reiss served as pastor of the following Michigan parishes:

- Holy Ghost in Detroit
- St. Mary in Port Huron
- Ss. Peter and Paul in Detroit
- St. Frances Cabrini Parish in Allen Park

=== Auxiliary Bishop of Detroit ===
On July 7, 2003, Pope John Paul II appointed Reiss as an auxiliary bishop of Detroit and titular bishop of Remesiana. He was consecrated on August 12, 2003, by Cardinal Adam Maida, with Cardinal Edmund Szoka and Walter Schoenherr serving as co-consecrators. Reiss selected as his episcopal motto: "In Christo Omnia" (Philippians 4:13).

Reiss was diagnosed with esophageal cancer in 2008, but it went into remission in 2009.

In October 2014, Reiss announced the removal of Reverend Thomas Belczakas as pastor of St. Kenneth Parish in Plymouth. Reiss said that Thomas Belczakas and his brother, Reverend Edward Belczakas, stole $110,000 from St. Kenneth to help purchase a condominium in Palm Beach, Florida.

=== Retirement ===
On November 11, 2015, Reiss submitted his letter of resignation as auxiliary bishop of Detroit, as required on his 75th birthday, and Pope Francis accepted it that day.

== See also ==
- Catholic Church hierarchy
- Catholic Church in the United States
- Historical list of the Catholic bishops of the United States
- List of Catholic bishops of the United States
- Lists of patriarchs, archbishops, and bishops

== Episcopal succession ==
Catholic Church titles
Preceded by –	Auxiliary Bishop of Detroit; 2003–2015	Succeeded by –
