= Christianity in Shanghai =

Christianity is a minority faith in Shanghai, a municipality in China.

Shanghai has the highest proportion of Catholic residents of any province-level division in mainland China (2003). The Roman Catholic Diocese of Shanghai has churches including St. Ignatius Cathedral of Shanghai and She Shan Basilica. Shanghai has far more Christians than Jews. The Konrad-Adenauer-Stiftung, which is close to the governing party Christian Democratic Union (Germany) of Germany, has an office in Shanghai.

== List of Protestant missionaries in Shanghai ==
Below is a selection of historic Protestant missionaries in Shanghai:

- Young John Allen
- William Jones Boone
- William Jones Boone, Jr.
- Joseph Edkins
- Frederick Rogers Graves
- Walter Russell Lambuth
- William Lockhart
- Walter Lowrie
- Walter Henry Medhurst
- William Muirhead
- Francis Lister Hawks Pott
- Samuel Isaac Joseph Schereschewsky
- James Hudson Taylor
- Matthew Tyson Yates

== See also ==
- Shanghighlander
- Christianity in Shanghai's neighbouring provinces
  - Christianity in Jiangsu
  - Christianity in Zhejiang
