= Diocese of Shangqiu =

Roman Catholic diocese in China

Diocese of Guide Dioecesis Coeitevensis 天主教归德教区

Location
- Country: China
- Ecclesiastical province: Kaifeng
- Metropolitan: Kaifeng

Statistics
- Area: 8,000 km^{2} (3,100 sq mi)
- Population: Total; Catholics: (as of 1950); 2,000,000; 9,973 (0.5%)

Information
- Rite: Latin Rite
- Cathedral: Cathedral of the Sacred Heart of Jesus in Shangqiu

Current leadership
- Pope: Leo XIV
- Bishop: Sede Vacante
- Metropolitan Archbishop: Joseph Gao Hong-xiao

The Roman Catholic Diocese of Shangqiu /Guide/ Kweíteh (Latin: Coeiteven(sis), Chinese: 歸德, 商邱) is a suffragan Latin diocese in the ecclesiastical province of Kaifeng in eastern China, yet depends on the missionary Roman Congregation for the Evangelization of Peoples.

Its cathedral episcopal see is Cathedral of the Sacred Heart of Jesus (South Church), located in the city of Shangqiu 商丘 (formerly Guide/ Kweíteh), in Henan province.

No statistics available. It is vacant, without apostolic administrator, since 2009.

== History ==
- Established June 19, 1928 as Apostolic Prefecture of Guide 歸德/ de Kweiteh (Latin), on territory split off from the then Apostolic Vicariate of Kaifengfu 開封府 (now its Metropolitan)
- Promoted on May 18, 1937 as Apostolic Vicariate of Guide 歸德
- Promoted on April 11, 1946 as Diocese of Shangqiu/Guide 歸德 / Cœiteven(sis) (Latin)

== Episcopal ordinaries ==
(all Roman rite, so far members of a missionary Latin Congregation)

Apostolic Prefect of Guide/ Kweíteh 歸德

- father Francisco Javier Ochoa Ullate, Order of Saint Augustine (O.A.R.) (born Spain) (8 January 1929 – 18 May 1937 see below)

Apostolic Vicar of Guide/ Kweíteh 歸德

- Francisco Javier Ochoa Ullate, O.A.R. (see above 18 May 1937 – 11 April 1946 see below), Titular Bishop of Chusira (1937.05.18 – 1946.04.11)

Suffragan Bishops of Shangqiu/Guide

- Francisco Javier Ochoa Ullate, O.A.R. (see above 11 April 1946 – retired 11 December 1947), emeritate as Titular Bishop of Remesiana (1947.12.11 – death 1976.09.06)
- Arturo Quintanilla Manzanares, O.A.R. (born Spain) (10 November 1949 – death 21 November 1970)
- Nicholas Shi Jing-xian, O.S.A. (first China-born incumbent) (1991 - uncanonical since 1999 - death 2001)
- vacancy.

== See also ==
- List of Catholic dioceses in China

== Sources and external links ==
- GCatholic.org - data for all sections
- Catholic Hierarchy
