= Joseph Zhang Yinlin =

- Bishop of Weihui
- Native name: 张银林
- Province: Henan
- Diocese: Roman Catholic Diocese of Weihui
- Installed: 8 May 2016
- Predecessor: Thomas Zhang Huai-xin

Orders
- Ordination: 2004
- Consecration: 2015

Personal details
- Born: April 1971 (age 55) Linzhou, Henan, China
- Denomination: Roman Catholic
- Education: National Seminary of Catholic Church in China
- Coat of arms

Chinese name
- Traditional Chinese: 張銀林
- Simplified Chinese: 张银林
Transcriptions
Standard Mandarin
- Hanyu Pinyin: Zhāng Yínlín

Joseph Zhang Yinlin (Chinese: 张银林; born April 1971) is a Chinese Catholic priest and the current bishop of Weihui.

== Biography ==
Zhang was born in Linzhou, Henan, in April 1971. He graduated from the National Seminary of Catholic Church in China in 1996. He was ordained a priest in 2004.

In 2011 he was elected deputy director of the Henan Catholic Academic Affairs Committee. In 2013 he was elected a member of the 12th Henan People's Political Consultative Conference of the Chinese People's Political Consultative Conference.

On April 29, 2015, he was elected Coadjutor Bishop of Anyang, which was recognized by the Pope. On May 8, 2016, he became bishop of Weihui.

Catholic Church titles
Previous: Thomas Zhang Huai-xin	Bishop of Weihui; 2016	Incumbent
