= Christianity in Zhejiang =

Christianity is a minority in Zhejiang province of China. Zhejiang has one of the largest Protestant populations of China. Immaculate Conception Cathedral of Hangzhou is in Zhejiang. Zhejiang has greater religious freedom of Christianity than other parts of the country. There were more than 600 detentions of Christians in the province in 2006. The Shouters are active in the province. Christianity in Wenzhou is a disproportionately large population.

== Roman Catholic dioceses with seat in Zhejiang ==
- Roman Catholic Archdiocese of Hangzhou
- Roman Catholic Diocese of Lishui
- Roman Catholic Diocese of Ningbo
- Roman Catholic Diocese of Taizhou
- Roman Catholic Diocese of Yongjia

== See also ==
- Chinese Rites controversy
- Zhushenjiao
- Christianity in Zhejiang's neighbouring provinces
  - Christianity in Anhui
  - Christianity in Fujian
  - Christianity in Jiangsu
  - Christianity in Jiangxi
  - Christianity in Shanghai
