= Christianity in Shandong =

Christianity is a minority religion in Shandong province of China. Christianity in Henan, Christianity in Anhui and Christianity in Jiangsu are other major provincial Christian populations. Cheeloo University is defunct. St. Michael's Cathedral, Qingdao and Sacred Heart Cathedral (Jinan) are churches of European style. Another European-style church is due to be built in Qufu, where Confucius originated. This idea was or is opposed by Confucianist groups. There is official action against house churches.

== Roman Catholic dioceses with seat in Shandong ==
- Roman Catholic Archdiocese of Jinan
- Roman Catholic Diocese of Caozhou
- Roman Catholic Diocese of Qingdao
- Roman Catholic Diocese of Yanggu
- Roman Catholic Diocese of Yantai
- Roman Catholic Diocese of Yanzhou
- Roman Catholic Diocese of Yizhou
- Roman Catholic Diocese of Zhoucun

== See also ==
- Spirit Church
- Christianity in Shandong's neighbouring provinces
  - Christianity in Anhui
  - Christianity in Hebei
  - Christianity in Henan
  - Christianity in Jiangsu
