= Cathedral of St. Thomas, Hefei =

Catholic cathedral in Anhui, China

- Cathedral of St. Thomas
- 圣多默主教座堂
- Location: Catholic Bishop's House, Xinhua Industrial Zone, Zhangwa Road, Hefei, Hefei, Anhui (ANHUI) 230041
- Country: China
- Denomination: Roman Catholic

History
- Status: Cathedral
- Dedication: St. Thomas

Architecture
- Functional status: Active

Administration
- Archdiocese: Roman Catholic Archdiocese of Anqing

Clergy
- Archbishop: vacant

Cathedral of St. Thomas located in Hefei, Anhui, China, is a Roman Catholic cathedral serving as the active cathedral for the Roman Catholic Archdiocese of Anqing, China.
