= Diocese of Xinyang =

Latin Catholic diocese in China

Diocese of Xinyang Dioecesis Siniamensis 天主教信阳教区

Catholic

Location
- Country: China
- Ecclesiastical province: Kaifeng
- Metropolitan: Kaifeng

Statistics
- Area: 30,000 km^{2} (12,000 sq mi)
- Population: Total; Catholics: (as of 1950); 6,000,000; 13,654 (0.2%)

Information
- Denomination: Catholic Church
- Sui iuris church: Latin Church
- Rite: Latin Rite

Current leadership
- Pope: Leo XIV
- Bishop: sede vacante
- Metropolitan Archbishop: Joseph Gao Hongxiao

The Diocese of Xinyang (also known as Sinyang; Latin: Siniamen(sis), Chinese: 信陽) is a diocese located in the city of Xinyang in the ecclesiastical province of Kaifeng in China.

== History ==
- December 15, 1927: Established as the Apostolic Prefecture of Xinyangzhou 信陽州 from Apostolic Vicariate of Kaifengfu 開封府
- April 25, 1933: Promoted as Apostolic Vicariate of Xinyangzhou 信陽州
- April 11, 1946: Promoted as Diocese of Xinyang 信陽

== Leadership ==
- Bishops of Xinyang 信陽 (Roman rite)
  - Bishop Antonio Pott, S.V.D. (March 8, 1951 – 1954)
  - Bishop Vitus Zhang Zuo-heng (Chang Tso-huan), S.V.D. (張作恆) (April 11, 1946 – November 13, 1949)
- Vicars Apostolic of Xinyangzhou 信陽州 (Roman Rite)
  - Bishop Vitus Zhang Zuo-heng (Chang Tso-huan), S.V.D. (張作恆) (July 8, 1941 – April 11, 1946)
  - Bishop Ermanno Schoppelrey, S.V.D. (December 13, 1933 – May 25, 1940)
- Prefects Apostolic of Xinyangzhou 信陽州 (Roman Rite)
  - Fr. Giorgio Froewis, S.V.D. (August 1, 1928 – 1932)
