= Luigi Calza =

Roman Catholic Bishop

Most Reverend Luigi Calza, S.X.
- Vicar Apostolic of Zhengzhou; Titular Bishop of Termessus
- Appointed: 23 June 1906
- Term ended: 27 October 1944
- Successor: Bishop Faustino M. Tissot, S.X.

Orders
- Ordination: 24 May 1902 by Bishop Francesco Magani
- Consecration: 12 April 1912 by Guido Maria Conforti

Personal details
- Born: 26 July 1879 Parma, Italy
- Died: 27 October 1944 (aged 65) Zhengzhou, China
- Denomination: Roman Catholic

Luigi Calza also known as Luigi Calza (Calzi) was an Italian Roman Catholic prelate, member of the Xaverian Missionary Fathers, who served as Prefect and Vicar Apostolic in China from 1906 to 1944. He is considered the first Xaverian bishop appointed in China.

== Early life ==
Calza was born in Parma, Italy on 26 July 1879.

== Priesthood ==
Luigi became a professed member of the Xaverian Missionary Fathers in year 1897 and was ordained a priest on 24 May 1902 by Bishop Francesco Magani.

== Episcopate ==
Luigi was appointed Prefect of the Prefecture Apostolic of Western Honan {Ho-Nan Occidentale} nowadays Roman Catholic Diocese of Zhengzhou on 23 June 1906. He was appointed Vicar Apostolic of Prefecture Apostolic of Western Honan {Ho-Nan Occidentale} and Titular Bishop of Termessus (Titular See) on 18 September 1911 and consecrated a bishop by St. Guido Maria Conforti on 12 April 1912. During the famine of 1911 to 1913, he opened orphanages for the orphans and set up many schools, training centres and hospitals in Zhengzhou.

== Death ==
Calza died in China on 27 October 1944.
