= Sacred Heart Cathedral, Kaifeng =

Catholic cathedral in Kaifeng, China

Sacred Heart Cathedral
- Lishiting Catholic Church
- 耶稣圣心主教座堂
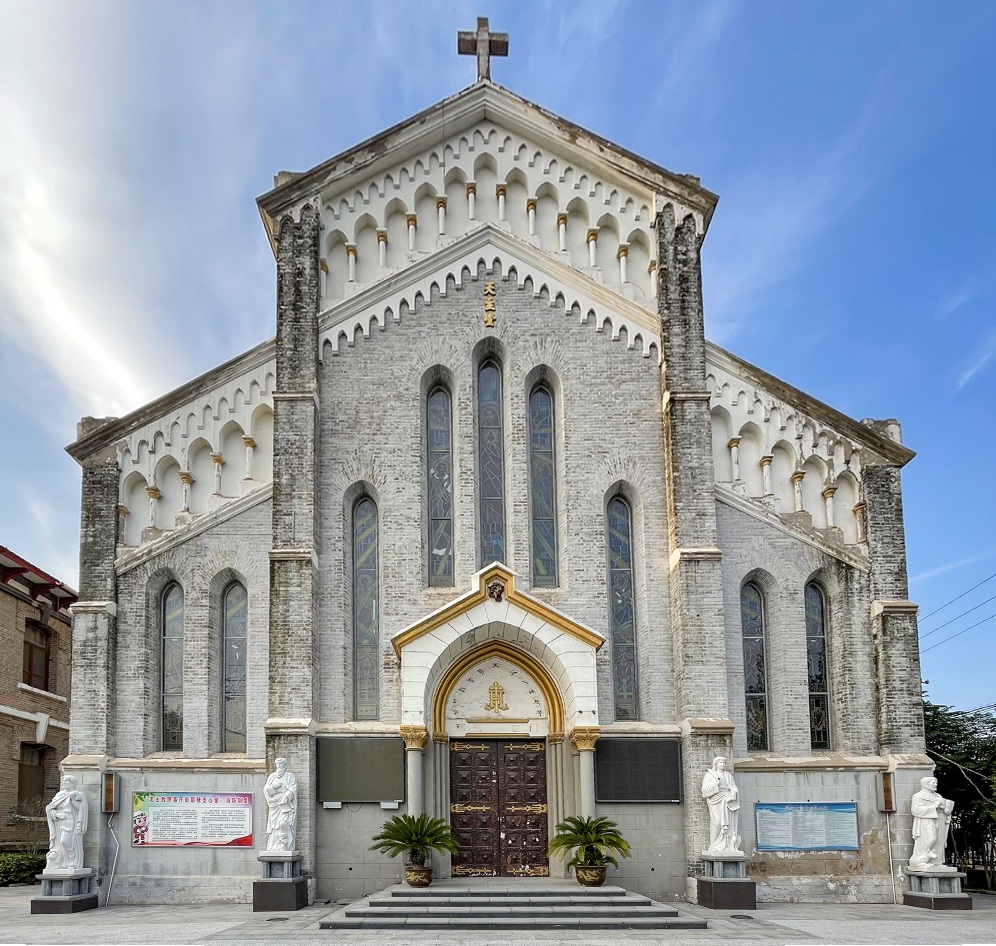
- The main facade of the cathedral, in 2021. The red-brick episcopal residence is on the left.
- Sacred Heart Cathedral
- 34°47′50″N 114°21′29″E
- Location: 41 Lishiting St, Shunhe, Kaifeng, Henan
- Country: China
- Denomination: Catholic Church
- Sui iuris church: Latin Church

History
- Founder: Noè Giuseppe Tacconi
- Dedication: Sacred Heart of Jesus

Architecture
- Years built: 1917–1919

Administration
- Archdiocese: Archdiocese of Kaifeng

The Sacred Heart Cathedral (Note: Simplified Chinese: 耶稣圣心主教座堂; traditional Chinese: 耶穌聖心主教座堂; pinyin: Yēsū Shèngxīn Zhǔjiào Zuòtáng.) is a Catholic cathedral in Kaifeng, Henan, China. Completed in 1919, it is the largest Catholic church in the province. The cathedral complex includes a bell tower and the episcopal residence, and is listed as a province-level cultural heritage and protected site.

== History ==
The history of Catholicism in Kaifeng traces back to the 17th century, when Jesuits including Giulio Aleni and Nicolas Trigault visited the city in search of the Kaifeng Jews. In 1629, Francesco Sambiasi founded the first Catholic church in Kaifeng, but it was destroyed by the flood of the Yellow River in 1642.

In 1916, the Apostolic Vicariate of Eastern Honan was established in Kaifeng, and the Italian Noè Giuseppe Tacconi was its inaugural apostolic vicar. In the autumn of 1916, Tacconi went to the United States to raise funds for a cathedral because European countries were involved in World War I. He also sought people from Shanghai and Tianjin to design and build the cathedral. After he returned to Kaifeng in 1917, he purchased local residences around Lishiting Street (理事厅街) for the site of the cathedral, and went to Tianjin to hire a French building company. The construction began in 1917 and commenced in 1919.

In 1937, during the Second Sino-Japanese War, the Japanese forces conducted airstrikes in Kaifeng. Tacconi made four large flags, including two flags of Italy and two flags of Vatican City. When the air-raid siren sounded, workers would hoist a flag to the top of the cathedral's bell tower to prevent attacks on the cathedral.

In August 1946, during the Chinese Civil War, the Communist forces took control of northern Henan, southern Hebei, and eastern Shandong. Some clergy and believers from these areas fled to Kaifeng and lived in the dormitory building of the cathedral complex. On 13 April 1947, Gaetano Pollio was consecrated as the bishop of Kaifeng at the cathedral by Antonio Riberi, Apostolic Internuncio to China. In May 1948, during the First Battle of Kaifeng, Chen Shiju, commander of the communist forces, set up his headquarters at the cathedral and used the bell tower of the cathedral to observe and direct combat. Kuomintang forces also hit the bell tower with two mortar shots.

During the Cultural Revolution, the cathedral was damaged: stained glass windows were broken, and the roof tiles were disarranged. In the 1990s, the cathedral was renovated. In 2006, it was recognised as province-level cultural heritage protected site (省级文物保护单位).

== Current state ==
=== Cathedral building ===
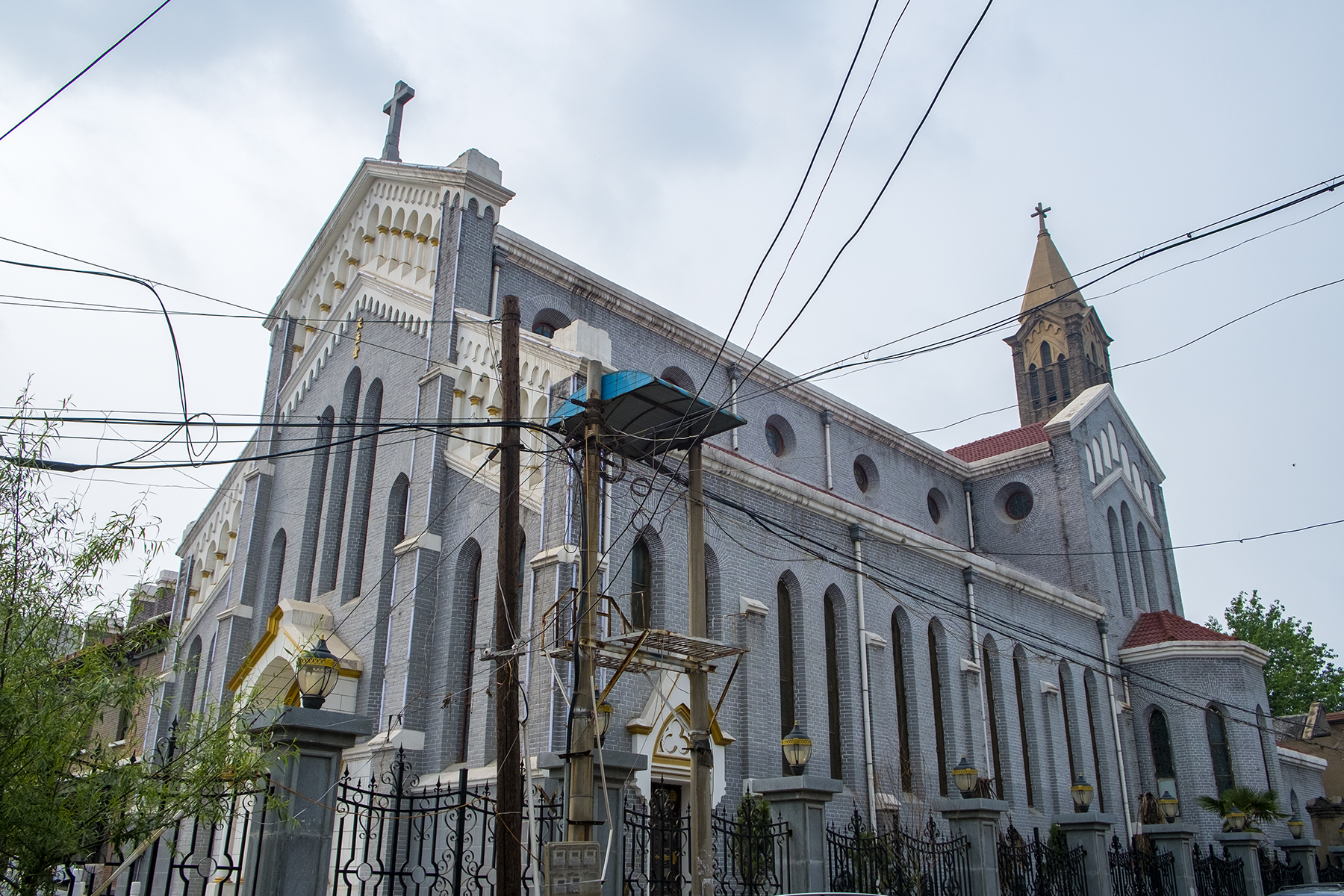
The cathedral seen from the south-eastern corner, with the bell tower behind it.

The cathedral is the largest Catholic church building in Henan. It is in basilica form, 34.6 metres (114 ft) long, and 22.7 metres (74 ft) wide. The total floor area is 619.2 square metres (6,665 sq ft): the ground floor is 584 square metres (6,290 sq ft), and the choir loft is 35.2 square metres (379 sq ft). The altar is placed at the north under a semispherical dome, with an altar to the Virgin Mary on its east and an altar to Saint Joseph on its west.

The cathedral is made of bricks and timber. It has twelve cylindrical pillars separated by arches. Its ceiling height along the nave is 14.7 metres (48 ft). The roof used to be covered with special tiles from Tianjin that were stringed by copper wires from the back, but during the Cultural Revolution, Red Guards removed the wires. In the 1990s, the old tiles were replaced with roof tiles made in Kaifeng.

The main façade of the cathedral faces south. On the façade, there are several windows topped with pointed arches. The five windows in the center of the façade used to feature five images, with the Sacred Heart of Jesus at the center, Saint Peter and Saint Paul to the left and right, and Francis Ferdinand de Capillas and John Gabriel Perboyre on the far left and far right. De Capillas and Perboyre were martyred in China because of the Qing prescription against Christianity. The stained glass windows were shattered during the Cultural Revolution, and were later replaced with plain glass.

=== Associated buildings ===
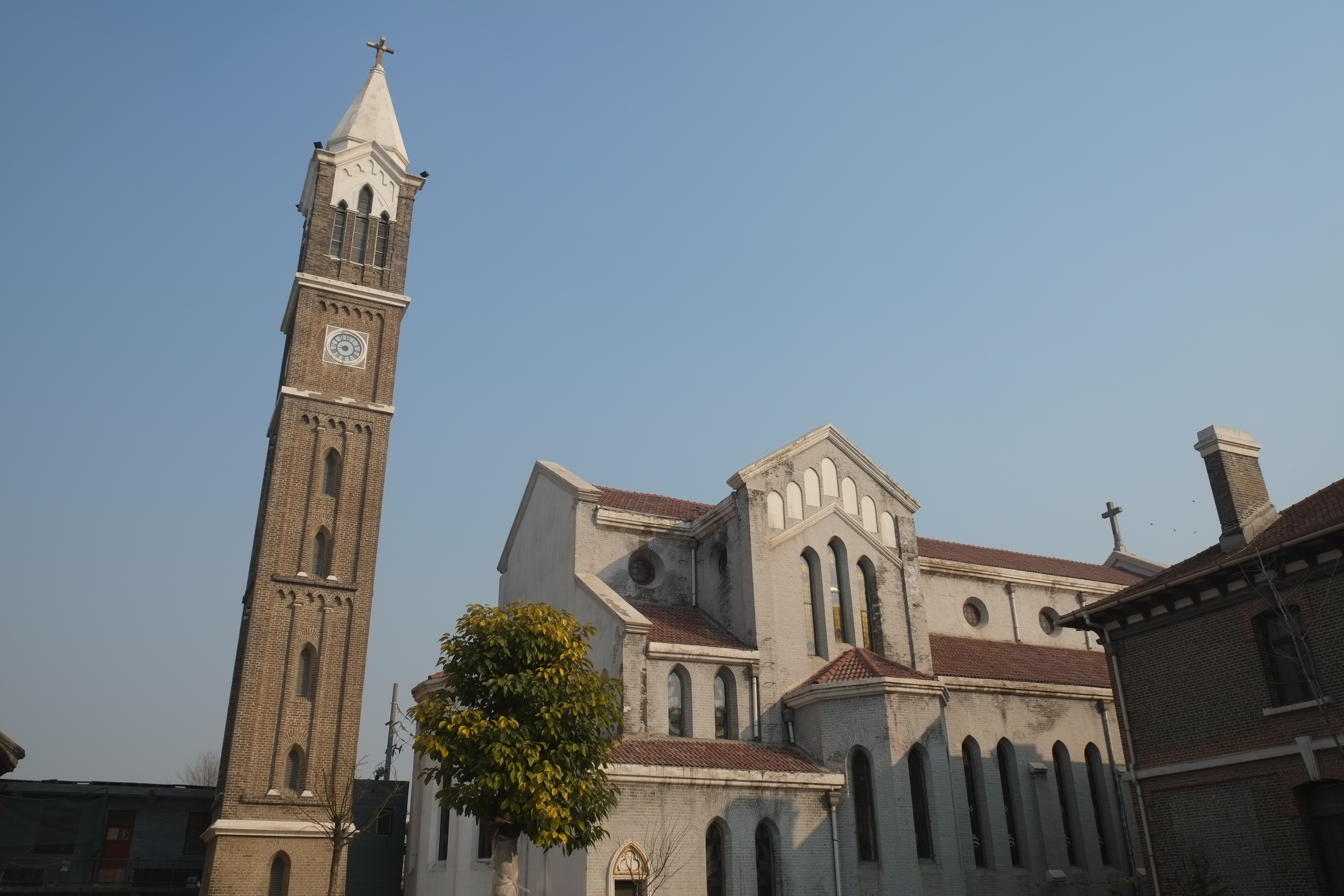
The bell tower is situated behind the cathedral.

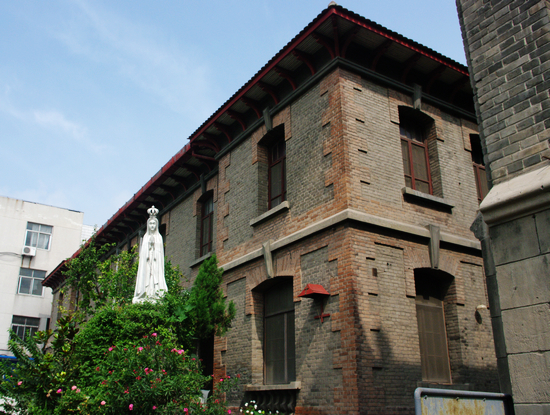
The former episcopal residence, with a statue of Mary in the front.

The bell tower stands independently to the north of the cathedral. It has four floors, with an entrance to the south. It is topped by a 3 metres (9.8 ft) cement cross. The bell tower is made of bricks with cement floor boards.

There is a large bronze bell the top of the bell tower, with a diameter of 0.8 metres (31 in). It has a pulley with ropes reaching to the ground floor of the tower for bell ringers. The bell was made in 1921. It is decorated with patterns of fauna and flora, and with the Latin inscription by Tacconi:

PELLO TEMPESTATES FLEO MORTUOS VOCO POPULUM MONEO DEVOTIONEM

I fight against the storms, I weep for the dead, I call the people, and I remind of devotion.

The former episcopal residence is 4 metres (13 ft) to the west of the cathedral. It has two storeys above the ground and one basement to store the wine for the Eucharist. It is 31 metres (102 ft) long and 16 metres (52 ft) wide, with a total floor area of 1,514 square metres (16,300 sq ft). Currently, the ground floor is used for reception and dining, and clergy members live on the floor above.
