= Joseph Liu Xinhong =

- Bishop of Anqing
- Native name: 刘新红
- Church: Catholic Church
- Archdiocese: Archdiocese of Anqing
- Installed: 3 May 2006
- Predecessor: Joseph Zhu Huayu

Orders
- Ordination: 18 November 1990
- Consecration: 3 May 2006 by John Wu Shi-zhen

Personal details
- Born: 1964 (age 61–62)
- Coat of arms

Joseph Liu Xinhong (Simplified Chinese: 刘新红, Traditional Chinese: 劉新紅) is the Chinese Patriotic Catholic Association-sponsored Bishop of Anhui. As a layman, he was considered the strongman of the Chinese Patriotic Catholic Association, whose deputy chairman he was. This association was established in 1957 to oppose relations with Rome. Consecrated as bishop in 2006 without pontifical mandate, he was automatically excommunicated.

On September 22, 2018, Pope Francis lifted the excommunication of Joseph Liu Xinhong and other six bishops previously appointed by the Chinese government without a pontifical mandate.

== See also ==
- Joseph Ma Yinglin
- Zhan Silu
- Joseph Li Shan
- Bernardine Dong Guangqing
