= Briparo =

Serbian locality

Briparo (Greek: Βρίπαρο) was a locality in the Remesiana region, present Bela Palanka, Serbia.
