= Remesiana =

Ancient Roman city in Serbia

Coordinates: 43°13′4.8″N 22°18′26.78″E

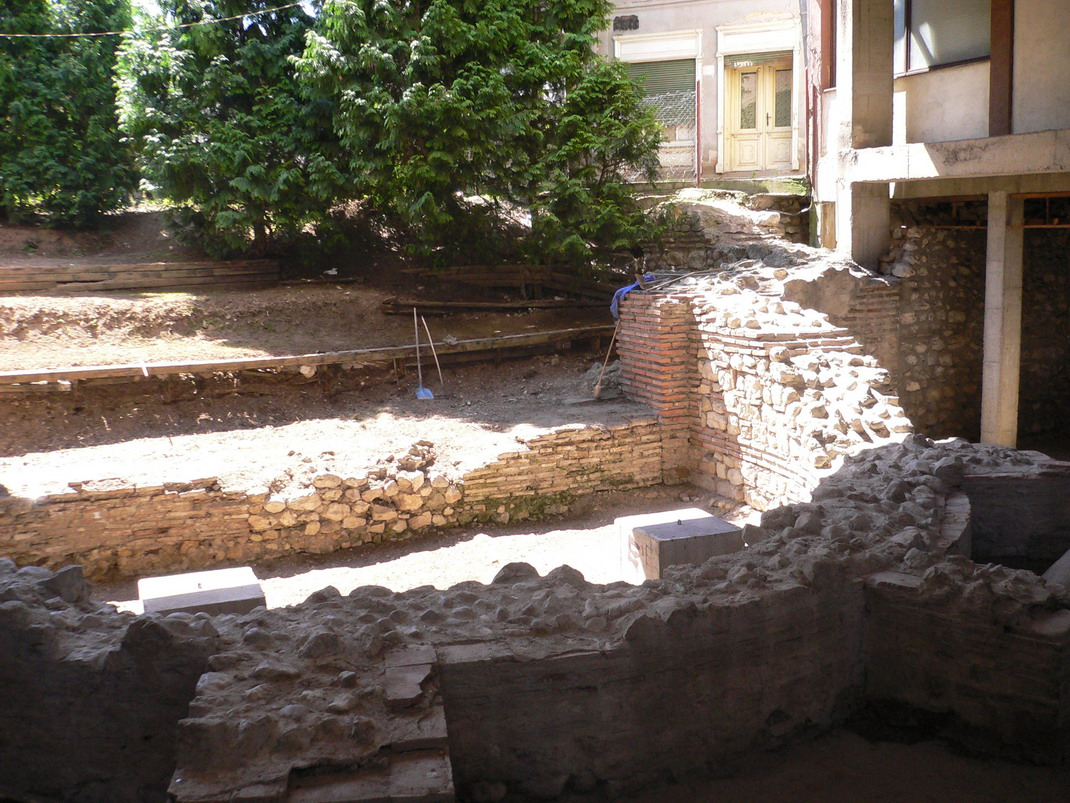
Basilica Apse under excavation in Remesiana, found under modern residential building.

Remesiana (Byzantine Greek: Ρεμεσιανισία) was an ancient Roman city and former bishopric, which remains an Eastern Orthodox and also a Latin Catholic titular see, located around and under the modern city of Bela Palanka in Serbia.

Remesiana was declared an Archaeological Sites of Great Importance in 1987, and it is protected by Republic of Serbia.

== History ==
Remesiana was built after the Roman conquest of Moesia, in the area of the town Aiadava. It was on the route of ancient Via Militaris road between Naissus and Serdica in Dacia Mediterranea.

=== Districts ===
Byzantine Emperor Justinian had the following strongholds in the district of Remesiana : Brittura, Subaras, Lamponiana, Stronges, Dalmatas, Primiana, Phrerraria, Topera, Tomes, Cuas, Tzertzenutzas, Stens, Aeadaba, Destreba, Pretzouries, Cumudeba, Deurias, Lutzolo, Rhepordenes, Spelonca, Scumbro, Briparo, Tulcoburgo, Longiana, Lupophantana, Dardapara, Burdomina, Grinciapana, Graecus and Drasimarca.

==== Localities ====
- Briparo

=== Site of the Assembly ===
Austrian historian Karl Patsch's opinion that the provincial assembly of Moesia Superior sat at Remesiana, based upon the fact that some inscriptions were discovered, "inaugurated between 202 and 209 by Ulpiana in honour of Septimius Severus and Julia Augusta," is not correct.

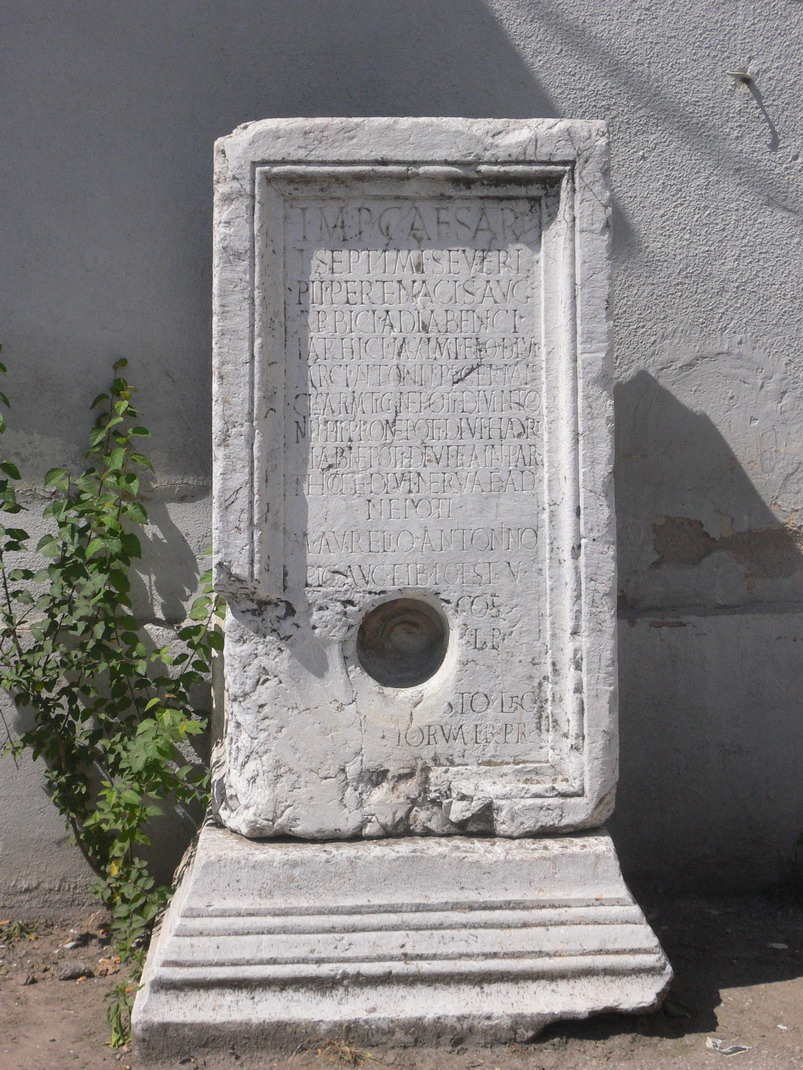
Septimius Severus's monument in Bela Palanka

One can see in a recently discovered inscription of identical content that these inscriptions were inaugurated in 202. However, that year Septimius Severus returned from the east to Rome and probably passed through Remesiana and on that occasion the inscriptions were inaugurated.

== Ecclesiastical History ==
Remesiana was import enough in the Late Roman province of Dacia Mediterranea to become (circa 300 AD) one of the suffragans of its capital's Metropolitan, the Archdiocese of Serdica, in the sway of the Patriarchate of Constantinople.

It was suppressed circa 500 AD.

Only two residential Suffragan Bishops of Remesiana are historically documented :

- Saint Nicetas of Remesiana (fl. ca. 335–414), friend of Paulinus of Nola, and to whom Gennadio di Marsiglia dedicated a brief biographical note in De Viris Illustribus, patron saint of Romania, canonized by both Catholic and Orthodox churches
- Diogenianus, participant at the Second Council of Ephesus in 449.

=== Titular see ===
Remesiana is an Eastern Orthodox titular see, within the ecclesiastical hierarchy of the Serbian Orthodox Church.

Remesiana is also a Roman Catholic titular see since circa 1890, when the diocese as nominally restored as Latin titular bishopric of Remesiana (Latin = Curiate Italian) / Remesianen(sis) (Latin adjective).

It has had the following incumbents, so far of the fitting Episcopal (lowest) rank :

- Joseph-Marie Leray, Sacred Heart Missionaries (M.S.C.) (born France) (1897.07.27 – death 1929.10.17) as first Apostolic Vicar of Gilbert Islands (Kiribati) (1897.07.27 – 1927) and emeritate
- Federico Melendro Gutiérrez (梅耿光), Jesuits (S.J.) (born Spain) (1930.02.14 – 1946.04.11) as only Apostolic Vicar of Anqing 安慶 (China) (1930.02.14 – 1946.04.11); later promoted first Metropolitan Archbishop of Anqing 安慶 (1946.04.11 – death 1978.10.25)
- Francisco Javier Ochoa Ullate (陳明理), Augustinian Recollects (O.A.R.) (born Spain) (1947.12.11 – 1976.09.06) as emeritate; formerly only Apostolic Prefect of Guide 歸德 (China) (1929.01.08 – 1937.05.18), (see) promoted only Apostolic Vicar of Guide 歸德 (1937.05.18 – 1946.04.11) and Titular Bishop of Chusira (1937.05.18 – 1946.04.11), again (see) promoted first Bishop of Shangqiu 商邱 (China) (1946.04.11 – retired 1947.12.11)
- Jacques Louis Marie Joseph Fihey (1977.05.31 – 1989.04.22) as Auxiliary Bishop of Archdiocese of Marseille (France) (1977.05.31 – 1983.02.12); later Bishop of the Military Vicariate of the French Armed Forces (1983.02.12 – 1986.07.21), restyled Bishop of the Military Ordinariate of the French Armed Forces (1986.07.21 – 1989.04.22), finally Bishop of Coutances (France) (1989.04.22 – retired 2006.10.02), died 2017
- Sylvester Donovan Ryan (1990.02.17 – 1992.01.28) as Auxiliary Bishop of Archdiocese of Los Angeles (California, USA) (1990.02.17 – 1992.01.28); later Bishop of Monterey (USA) (1992.01.28 – retired 2006.12.19)
- Nicola De Angelis, Sons of the Immaculate Conception (C.F.I.C.) (born Italy) (1992.04.27 – 2002.12.28) as Auxiliary Bishop of Toronto (Ontario, Canada) (1992.04.27 – 2002.12.28); later Bishop of Peterborough (Canada) (2002.12.28 – retired 2014.04.08)
- Francis Ronald Reiss (2003.07.07 – ...) as Auxiliary Bishop of Archdiocese of Detroit (USA) (2003.07.07 – 2015.11.11) and on emeritate.

== See also ==
- Archaeological Sites of Great Importance (Serbia)
- List of Catholic dioceses in Serbia and Kosovo
- Tourism in Serbia

== Sources and external links ==
- GCatholic - former & titular bishopric

Bibliography

- Pius Bonifacius Gams, Series episcoporum Ecclesiae Catholicae, Leipzig 1931, p. 417
- Daniele Farlati-Jacopo Coleti, Illyricum Sacrum, vol. VIII, Venice 1817, pp. 77–84
- Zeiller, Jacques (1918). Les origines chrétiennes dans les provinces danubiennes de l'Empire romain. Paris: E. De Boccard.
- Michel Le Quien, Oriens christianus in quatuor Patriarchatus digestus, Paris 1740, vol. II, coll. 305-306
