= Agostino Gaetano Riboldi =

Italian cardinal

His Eminence Agostino Gaetano Riboldi
- Archbishop of Ravenna
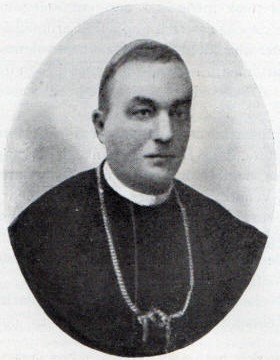
- Church: Roman Catholic Church
- Archdiocese: Ravenna
- See: Ravenna
- Appointed: 15 April 1901
- Term ended: 25 April 1902
- Predecessor: Sebastiano Galeati
- Successor: Guido Maria Conforti
- Other post: Cardinal-Priest of Santi Nereo ed Achilleo (1901-02)
- Previous post: Bishop of Pavia (1877-1901)

Orders
- Ordination: 11 August 1861
- Consecration: 22 April 1877 by Lucido Maria Parocchi
- Created cardinal: 15 April 1901 by Pope Leo XIII
- Rank: Cardinal-Priest

Personal details
- Born: Agostino Gaetano Riboldi; 18 February 1839 Paderno Dugnano, Kingdom of Lombardy–Venetia
- Died: 25 April 1902 (aged 63) Ravenna, Kingdom of Italy

Agostino Gaetano Riboldi (18 February 1839 – 25 April 1902) was an Italian cardinal of the Roman Catholic Church. He was the Bishop of Pavia from 1877 to 1901, and the Archbishop of Ravenna from 1901 to 1902. He was made a cardinal at the papal consistory held on 15 April 1901 and became the Cardinal-Priest of Santi Nereo ed Achilleo.

A street in the town of his birth, Paderno Dugnano, is named for him.
