= Peter Li Hongye =

Chinese Roman Catholic bishop

Peter Li Hongye (1920 – April 23, 2011) was a Roman Catholic bishop from China.

Li was the underground Roman Catholic bishop of the Roman Catholic Diocese of Luoyang. He died suddenly during the Easter Vigil liturgy.
