= Joseph Zhu Baoyu =

Chinese bishop (1921–2020)

Most Reverend Joseph Zhu Baoyu
- Bishop Emeritus of Nanyang
- Church: Catholic Church
- Diocese: Nanyang
- Appointed: November 21, 2002
- Term ended: 2010
- Predecessor: Joseph Jin Dechen
- Successor: Peter Jin Lugang

Orders
- Ordination: 1957
- Consecration: March 19, 1995 by Joseph Jin Dechen, Thomas Zhang Huai-xin, Nicholas Shi Jingxian

Personal details
- Born: 2 July 1921 Pushan, Henan, China
- Died: 7 May 2020 (aged 98) Nanyang, Henan, China

Joseph Zhu Baoyu (simplified Chinese: 朱宝玉; traditional Chinese: 朱寶玉; pinyin: Zhū Bǎoyù; July 2, 1921 – May 7, 2020) was a Chinese bishop of the Roman Catholic Church. He was Bishop Emeritus of Nanyang. The Chinese government considered him to be Titular Bishop of the Diocese.

== Biography ==
Zhu Baoyu was born on July 2, 1921, in Pushan, Henan. He was entrusted to an orphanage in Jingang at the age of 6, after his father's death. He was baptized into the Roman Catholic Church at 8. He studied theology and philosophy at Kaifeng Major Seminary, and was ordained to the priesthood in 1957.

In December 1981, Zhu Baoyu was arrested and subsequently sentenced to 10 years' imprisonment for "anti-revolutionary crime", reportedly for organizing a pilgrimage to the Sheshan Basilica. He was released on parole in 1988. In 1993 he was stated to be restricted to the village of Jingang.

A member of the underground church, Zhu Baoyu was appointed Coadjutor Bishop of Nanyang and consecrated with Vatican approval on March 19, 1995. He succeeded Joseph Jin Dechen as Bishop of Nanyang in 2002, and retired in 2010. A year later, on June 30, 2011, he was installed as a state-sanctioned Bishop of Nanyang. Then aged 90, Zhu Baoyu explained he had accepted the offer in hopes of influencing the Chinese government to return Church properties expropriated during the Cultural Revolution.

Zhu Baoyu fell ill on February 3, 2020, and was diagnosed with COVID-19. He was reported to no longer be infected on February 14. At the age of 98, he was one of the oldest patients to recover from the virus. Zhu died on May 7, 2020, in Nanyang at 98.
