= Dardapara =

Dardapara (Greek: Δαρδάπαρα) was two Thracian localities in the Dardania-Remesiana regions (Moesia), present Serbia.

Eastern Roman Emperor Justinian I (r. 527–565) rebuilt Dardapara.

A Dardapara has been connected with Grdelica, in Leskovac, southern Serbia.
