= Matthew Tyson Yates =

Matthew Tyson Yates was a Baptist Christian missionary who served with the American Southern Baptist Mission during the late Qing Dynasty in China.

== Works authored or edited ==
- Matthew Tyson Yates, Presbyterian church in U.S.A. Board of foreign missions. Central China mission. Press. Shanghai (1904). First lessons in Chinese (revised ed.). American Presbyterian Mission Press. pp. 151.
