= Diocese of Bengbu =

Roman Catholic diocese in China

Diocese of Bengbu Dioecesis Pampuvensis 蚌埠教区

Location
- Country: China
- Ecclesiastical province: Anqing
- Metropolitan: Anqing

Statistics
- Area: 60,000 km^{2} (23,000 sq mi)
- Population: Total; Catholics: (as of 1950); 9,000,000; 64,334 (0.7%)

Information
- Denomination: Roman Catholic
- Rite: Latin Rite
- Established: 21 February 1929 (As Vicariate Apostolic of Pengpu); 11 April 1946 (As Diocese of Bengbu)
- Cathedral: Bengbu Cathedral

Current leadership
- Pope: Leo XIV
- Bishop: Sede Vacante
- Metropolitan Archbishop: Sede Vacante

The Roman Catholic Diocese of Bengbu (Latin: Pampuven(sis), Chinese: 蚌埠) is a Latin Rite suffragan diocese in the ecclesiastical province of Anqing in eastern China, yet depends on the missionary Roman Congregation for the Evangelization of Peoples.

Its episcopal see is a cathedral in the city of Bengbu 蚌埠, Anhui province. It is vacant, without apostolic administrator since 2005.

No recent statistics available.

== History ==
- Established on 21 February 1929 as Apostolic Vicariate of Bengbu 蚌埠, on territory split off from the Apostolic Vicariate of Wuhu 蕪湖
- 11 April 1946: Promoted as Diocese of Bengbu 蚌埠 (中文) / Pengpu / Pampuven(sis) (Latin adjective)

== Episcopal ordinaries ==
(all Roman rite)

Apostolic Vicars of Bengbu 蚌埠 (Roman Rite)

- Tommaso Berutti, Jesuit Order (S.J.) (Italian) (19 December 1929 – retired 1933), Titular Bishop of Cusæ (1929.12.19 – death 1975.01.21)
- Cipriano Cassini, S.J. (Italian) (15 January 1937 – 11 April 1946 see below), Titular Bishop of Drivastum (1936.12.23 – 1946.04.11)

Suffragan Bishops of Bengbu 蚌埠

- Cipriano Cassini, S.J. (see above 11 April 1946 – 11 June 1951)
- uncanonical : Zhou Yi-zhai (周益齋) (1958 without papal mandate – death 1983.10.26)
- Joseph Zhu Hua-yu (朱化宇) (1986 – 2001), also Apostolic Administrator of Archdiocese of Anqing 安慶 (China) (1997 – 2001), Apostolic Administrator of Wuhu 蕪湖 (China) (1997 – 2005.02.26); later Metropolitan Archbishop of above Anqing 安慶 (2001 – 2005.02.26)
- Apostolic Administrator Father Xu Qin-zhong (許欽忠), S.J. (1997 – 2005), no other prelature.

== See also ==
- List of Catholic dioceses in China

== Sources and external links ==
- GCatholic.org - data for all sections
- Catholic Hierarchy
