= Diocese of Luoyang =

Roman Catholic diocese in China

Diocese of Luoyang Dioecesis Loiamensis 天主教洛阳教区

Location
- Country: China
- Ecclesiastical province: Kaifeng
- Metropolitan: Kaifeng

Statistics
- Area: 25,000 km^{2} (9,700 sq mi)
- Population: Total; Catholics: (as of 1950); 3,000,000; 10,122 (0.3%)

Information
- Rite: Latin Rite
- Cathedral: Cathedral of the Mother of God in Luoyang

Current leadership
- Pope: Leo XIV
- Bishop: Sede Vacante
- Auxiliary Bishops: Peter Mao Qingfu

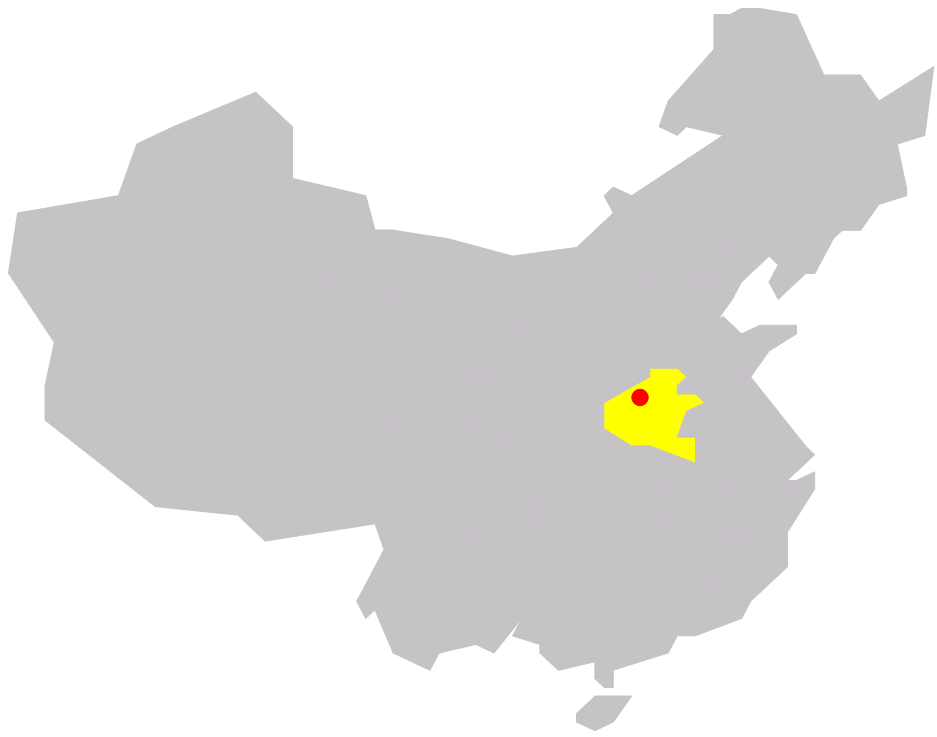
Location of Luoyang within China

The Roman Catholic Diocese of Luoyang/Loyang (Latin: Loiamen(sis), Chinese: 洛陽) is a diocese located in the city of Luoyang in the ecclesiastical province of Kaifeng in China.

== History ==
- May 25, 1929: Established as Apostolic Prefecture of Luoyang 洛陽 from the Apostolic Vicariate of Zhengzhou 鄭州
- January 28, 1935: Promoted as Apostolic Vicariate of Luoyang 洛陽
- April 11, 1946: Promoted as Diocese of Luoyang 洛陽

== Leadership ==
- Bishops of Luoyang 洛陽 (Roman rite)
  - Bishop Peter Li Hong-ye (1988 - 2011)
  - Bishop Assuero Teogano Bassi, S.X. (巴友仁) (April 11, 1946 – November 8, 1970)
- Vicars Apostolic of Luoyang 洛陽 (Roman Rite)
  - Bishop Assuero Teogano Bassi, S.X. (巴友仁) (January 28, 1935 – April 11, 1946)
- Prefects Apostolic of Luoyang 洛陽 (Roman Rite)
  - Fr. Assuero Teogano Bassi, S.X. (巴友仁) (later Bishop) (January 9, 1930 – January 28, 1935)
