= Thomas Zhang Huai-xin =

Roman Catholic bishop (1925–2016)

- Bishop of Weihui
- Native name: 張懷信
- Church: Catholic Church
- Diocese: Diocese of Weihui
- In office: 19 October 1981 – 8 May 2016
- Predecessor: Mario Civelli
- Successor: Joseph Zhang Yinlin

Orders
- Ordination: 19 October 1950 by Gaetano Pollio
- Consecration: 19 October 1981 by Julius Jia Zhiguo

Personal details
- Born: 23 May 1925 Honghetunxiang (north of Yindu), Honan Province, Republic of China
- Died: 8 May 2016 (aged 90) Anyang, Henan, China

Thomas Zhang Huai-xin (Chinese: 张怀信; 23 May 1925 – 8 May 2016) was a Chinese Catholic bishop.

Ordained to the priesthood in 1960, Zhang Huai-Xin was consecrated bishop of the Roman Catholic Diocese of Weihui, China, in 1981 and served until his death in 2016.

== Notes ==
Catholic Church titles
Previous: Mario Civelli	Bishop of Weihui; 1981-2016	Next: Joseph Zhang Yinlin
