= Nicetas of Remesiana =

Bishop of Remesiana (c. 335–414)

Saint Nicetas of Remesiana the Dardanian
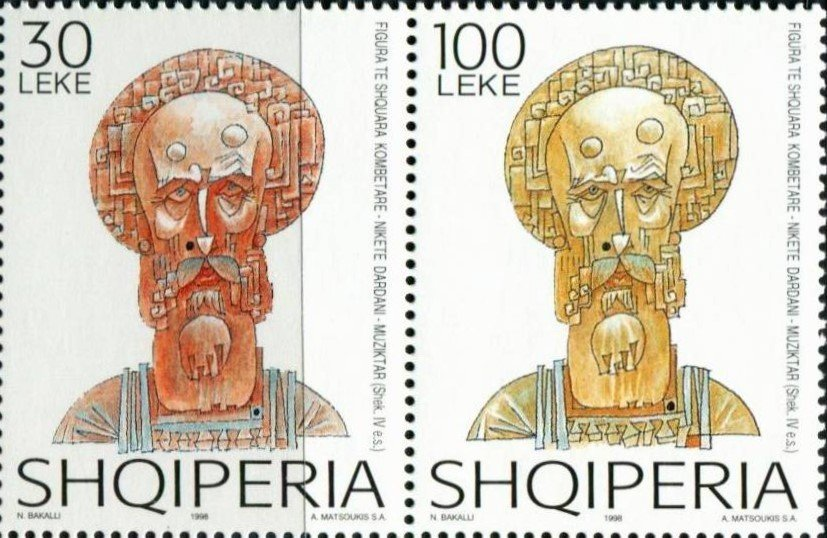

Bishop of Remesiana
- Born: c. 335
- Died: 414
- Venerated in: Eastern Orthodox Church; Roman Catholic Church
- Feast: 22 June
- Major works: Te Deum

Nicetas of Remesiana (c. 335 – 414) was an early Christian saint, writer, theologian and Bishop of Remesiana, which was then in the Roman province of Dacia Mediterranea.

== Early life ==
Nicetas was born in around AD 335 in the Roman Empire and was a Dardanian, a paleo-Balkan population, often aligned as Illyrian, inhabiting the ancient Balkans, as he claimed “I am Dardanian” (Latin: Dardanus sum). Remesiana was located in present-day Bela Palanka, Serbia.

== Religious activities ==
Nicetas promoted Latin sacred music for use during the liturgy and reputedly composed a number of liturgical hymns. Though some 19th- and 20th-century scholars number the major Latin Christian hymn of praise, the Te Deum, to Nicetas (traditionally attributed to Ambrose and Augustine), this is now considered "controversial". He is presumed to be the missionary to the barbarian Thracian tribe of the Bessi.

Because of his missionary activity, his contemporary and friend, Paulinus of Nola, lauded him poetically for instructing in the Gospel barbarians changed by him from wolves to sheep and brought into the fold of peace, and for teaching to sing of Christ with Roman heart bandits, who previously had no such ability. However, it is doubtful whether these barbarians really were barbarians, or whether their mention is only a poetical topos. Indeed, Paulinus, who wrote a quite classical Latin poetry, probably used existing poetical authorities. For Dacia, where Nicetas was from, the poetical authority was Ovid, although the Dacia (probably the province Dacia Mediterranea) of that time did not correspond with the Getia where Ovid had been banished to.

In 398, Nicetas made a pilgrimage to Nola to visit the grave of Felix of Nola.

Lengthy excerpts survive of his principal doctrinal work, Instructions for Candidates for Baptism, in six books. They show that he stressed the orthodox position in Trinitarian doctrine. They contain the expression "communion of saints" about the belief in a mystical bond uniting both the living and the dead in a certain hope and love. No evidence survives of previous use of this expression, which has since played a central role in formulations of the Christian creed.

== Veneration ==
His feast day as a saint is on 22 June.
