= Joseph T. C. Liu =

Joseph Tsu Chieh Liu (born 1934) is an engineer.

Liu completed a bachelor's degree, followed by a Master of Science in Engineering, at the University of Michigan in 1958. He worked for a Convair for a year and was based in Fort Worth, Texas, before pursuing a doctorate at the California Institute of Technology in 1964. Liu subsequently worked for the Gas Dynamics Laboratory at Princeton University's Department of Aerospace and Mechanical Sciences. He joined the Brown University faculty in 1966, and upon his retirement, was granted emeritus status. Liu was elected a fellow of the American Physical Society in 1984, "[f]or original and significant theoretical contributions in integrating and concepts of large scale turbulent structure into quantitative calculations of developing shear flows and their noise production."
