= Guido Maria Conforti =

Italian Roman Catholic saint

Saint Guido Maria Conforti
- Bishop of Parma
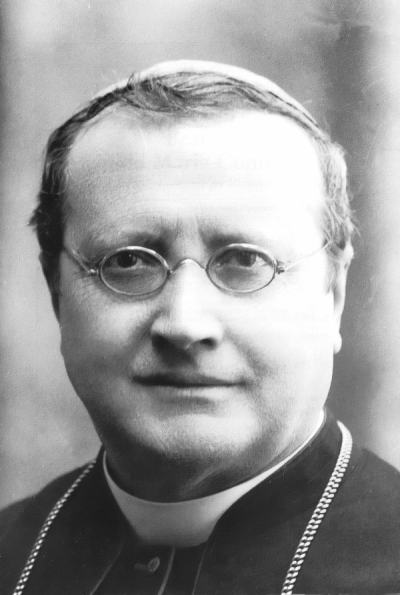
- Guido Maria Conforti in 1910.
- Church: Roman Catholic Church
- Diocese: Parma
- See: Parma
- Installed: 12 December 1907
- Term ended: 5 November 1931
- Predecessor: Francesco Magani
- Successor: Evasio Colli
- Previous posts: Vicar-General of Parma (1896–1902); Archbishop of Ravenna (1902–04); Titular Archbishop of Stauropolis (1904–07); Coadjutor Bishop of Parma (1904–07)

Orders
- Ordination: 22 September 1888 by Giovanni Andrea Miotti
- Consecration: 11 June 1902 by Lucido Maria Parocchi

Personal details
- Born: Guido Maria Conforti; 30 March 1865 Casalora di Ravadese, Parma, Italy
- Died: 5 November 1931 (aged 66) Parma, Italy
- Motto: In omnibus Christus ("Christ in all things")
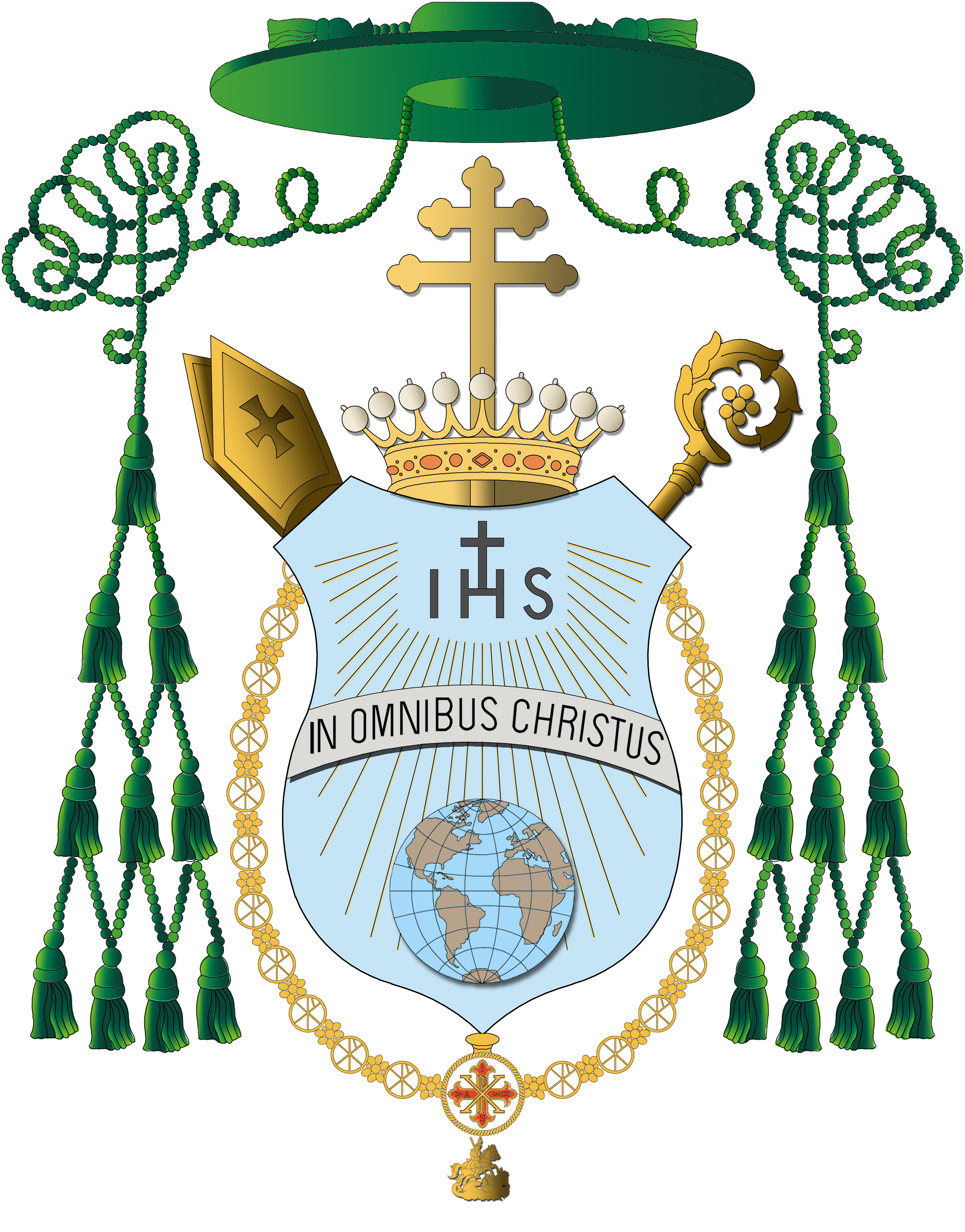
- Coat of arms

Sainthood
- Feast day: 5 November
- Venerated in: Roman Catholic Church
- Beatified: 17 March 1996; Saint Peter's Basilica, Vatican City by Pope John Paul II
- Canonized: 23 October 2011; Saint Peter's Square, Vatican City by Pope Benedict XVI
- Attributes: Episcopal attire
- Patronage: Xaverian Missionary Fathers

Ordination history of Guido Maria Conforti
History
Priestly ordination
- Ordained by: Giovani Andrea Miotti
- Date: 22 September 1888
- Place: Parma, Italy
Episcopal consecration
- Consecrated by: Lucido Maria Parocchi
- Date: 11 June 1902
Episcopal succession
Bishops consecrated by Guido Maria Conforti as principal consecrator
- Luigi Calza, S.X.: 12 April 1912

Guido Maria Conforti (30 March 1865 – 5 November 1931) was an Italian Roman Catholic archbishop who founded the Xaverian Missionaries (S.X.) on 3 December 1895. He was known to make frequent visits to his parishes and worked to support the religious education and religious involvement among the youth.

Pope John Paul II beatified him in 1996 and he was canonized in 2011 by Pope Benedict XVI.

== Biography ==
Guido Maria Conforti was born in Casalora di Ravadese in the diocese and province of Parma, Italy, in 1865, the eighth of ten children of Rinaldo and Antonia Adorni Conforti. He attended an elementary school run by the De La Salle Brothers from 1872 and each day on his way to the school he would stop by the church of Santa Maria della Pace, his parish church, where he used to have conversations with the crucified Jesus Christ. This was when his vocation became apparent. He later recalled: "I looked at Him and He looked at me and seemed to say so many things".

Although his father would have preferred that he stay and manage the farm, Conforti enrolled in the seminary in Parma in November 1876. He began reading the works of Francis Xavier which inspired a desire to be a missionary, but his requests to join the Society of Jesus or the Salesians of Saint John Bosco were denied. At the time, the rector of the seminary was Andrea Carlo Ferrari, future cardinal and Blessed. Ferrari became his mentor. Conforti was appointed vice-rector.

Conforti was ordained to the priesthood on 22 September 1888 at Fontanellato. Conforti then served as a professor at the local seminary. He became the Vicar-General of the Diocese of Parma on 7 March 1896.

=== Founder ===
Conforti established the Xaverian Missionaries on 3 December 1895 and the organization received the approval of Pope Leo XIII on 3 December 1898. In 1899, he sent the order's first missionaries to China. Leo XIII appointed him Archbishop of Ravenna in May 1902 following the death of Cardinal Agostino Gaetano Riboldi. He was consecrated bishop on 11 June 1902, at the Basilica of St Paul Outside the Walls in Rome. Conforti submitted his resignation due to his ill health in October 1904. On 14 November, he was made both the Coadjutor Bishop of Parma and Titular Archbishop of Stauropolis.

In 1907 he became Bishop of Parma, retaining his personal title of Archbishop. He traveled to all parishes via horseback or other means to inspect his diocese. He had a particular focus on religious education.

Conforti is said to have provided the initiative behind Pope Benedict XV's encyclical Maximum illud, issued on 30 November 1919. That document is called the Magna Carta of modern Catholic missionary work.

He travelled to China in 1928 to visit the Xaverian Missionaries working there. He arrived in Shanghai on 26 October 1928 and met with his contacts to inspect their work.

Conforti returned to Parma and fell ill in October 1931. He died a month later and he was interred in Parma. His tomb was later relocated in 1942 and in 1996.

== Sainthood ==
Conforti's spiritual writings were approved by theologians on 12 July 1946. The cause of sainthood was introduced in Parma on 29 May 1959 under Pope John XXIII and the work done on a diocesan level culminated on 11 February 1982 with Conforti being declared Venerable by Pope John Paul II on account of his life of heroic virtue.

The requisite miracle being approved, Conforti was beatified by John Paul II on 17 March 1996.

A second tribunal for a miracle needed for canonization opened on 4 October 2005 and closed on 16 November 2005 and Pope Benedict XVI approved the decree on 10 December 2010, leading to his canonization on 23 October 2011.

== Gallery ==
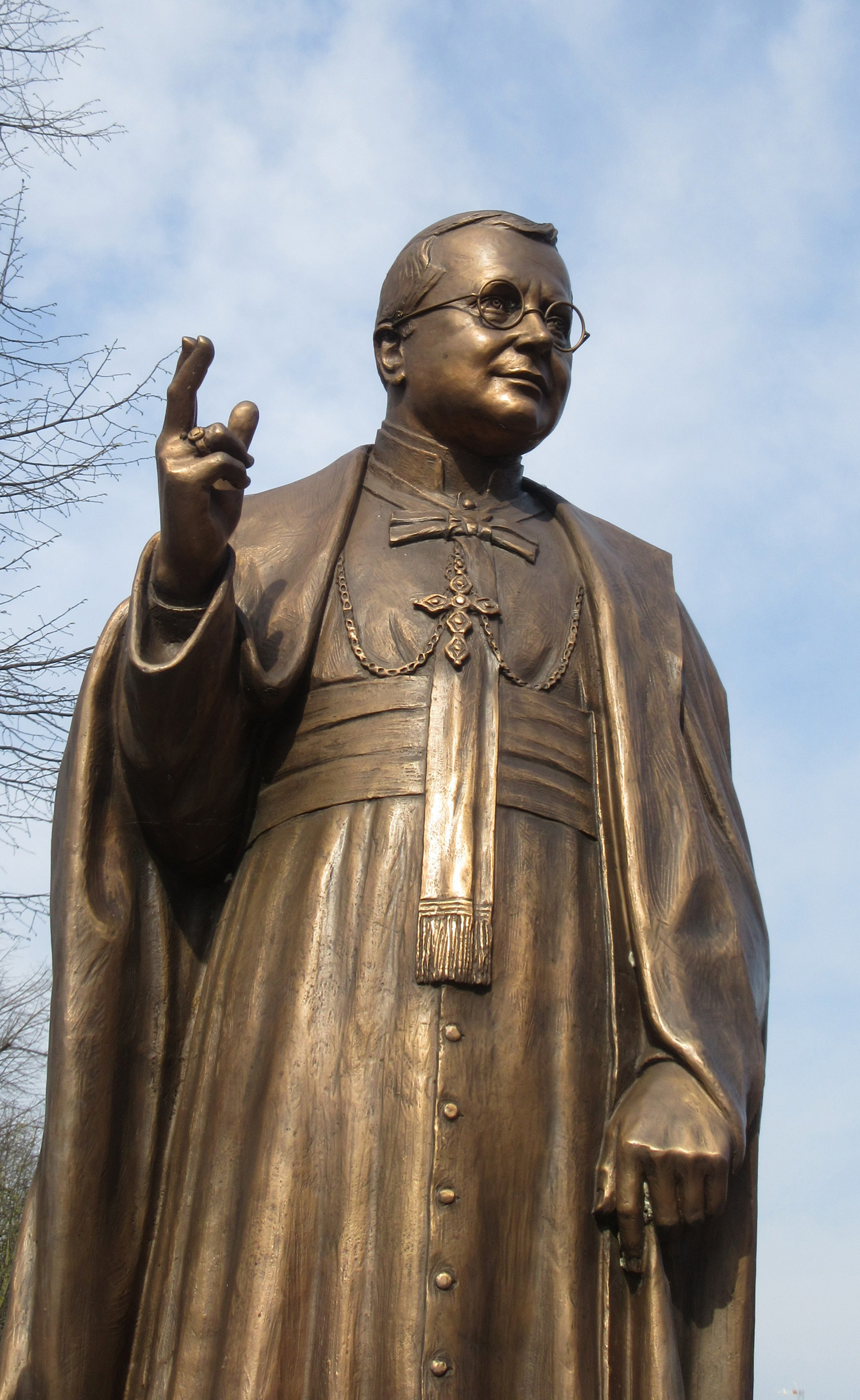
Statue of Conforti in Sanctuary of the Blessed Virgin of the Holy Rosary square

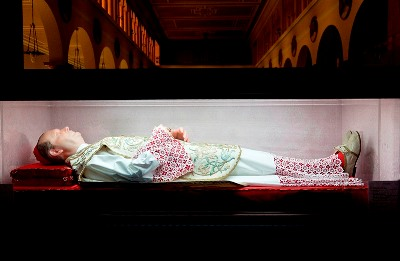
The tomb of Conforti

== Bibliography ==
- Augusto, Luca (2011). Guido Maria Conforti. Vescovo e missionario. Milan: Paoline Editoriale Libri. ISBN 978-88-315-3964-7.
- Botti, Ferruccio (1965). Mons. Guido Maria Conforti: note storico-critiche nel centenario della nascita. Quaderni di Vita nuova, 6 (in Italian). Parma: Scuola tipografica benedettina.
- Conforti, Paolo (2015). La casa del vescovo: San Guido Maria Conforti : storia della famiglia (in Italian). Parma: Silva editore. ISBN 978-88-7765-190-7.
- Etaba, Roger Onomo (2008). Les missionnaires xavériens au Cameroun (1898-2001) (in French). Yaoundé: Éditions CLÉ. ISBN 978-9956-0-9108-9.
- Manfredi, Angelo (2010). Guido Maria Conforti (in Italian). Bologna: EMI. ISBN 978-88-307-1892-0.
- Teodori, Franco (1998). Beato Guido Maria Conforti: omelie e lettere : giubileo costantiniano, primo congresso catechistico, settimana catechistica : 1913 (in Italian). Città del Vaticano: Libreria Editrice Vaticana. ISBN 9788820925574.
