= Diocese of Wuhu =

Roman Catholic diocese in China

Diocese of Wuhu Dioecesis Uhuvensis 芜湖教区
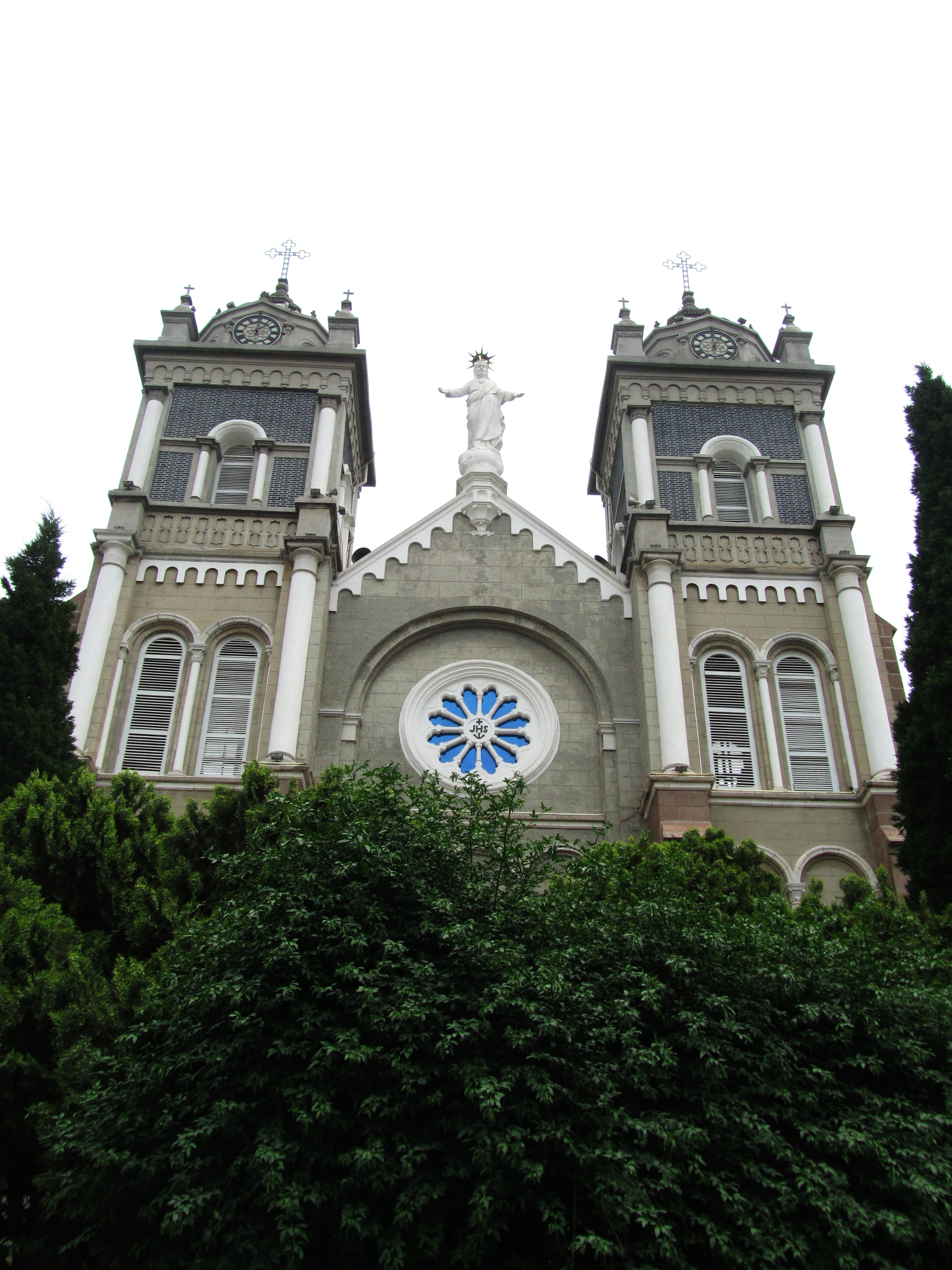
- Saint Joseph Cathedral

Location
- Country: China
- Ecclesiastical province: Anqing
- Metropolitan: Anqing

Statistics
- Population: Total; Catholics: (as of 1950); 5,000,000; 41,135 (0.8%)

Information
- Denomination: Roman Catholic
- Rite: Latin Rite
- Cathedral: Cathedral of St Joseph in Wuhu

Current leadership
- Pope: Leo XIV
- Bishop: Sede Vacante
- Metropolitan Archbishop: Sede Vacante

The Roman Catholic Diocese of Wuhu (Latin: Uhuven(sis), Chinese: 蕪湖) is a diocese located in the city of Wuhu in the ecclesiastical province of Anqing in China.

== History ==
- August 8, 1921: Established as the Apostolic Vicariate of Anhui 安徽 from the Apostolic Vicariate of Kiang-nan 江南)
- December 3, 1924: Renamed as Apostolic Vicariate of Wuhu 蕪湖
- April 11, 1946: Promoted as Diocese of Wuhu 蕪湖

== Leadership ==
- Bishops of Wuhu (Roman rite)
  - Bishop Zenón Arámburu Urquiola, S.J. (April 11, 1946 – April 4, 1969)
- Vicars Apostolic of Wuhu 蕪湖 (Roman Rite)
  - Bishop Zenón Arámburu Urquiola, S.J. (July 7, 1936 – April 11, 1946)
  - Bishop Vicente Huarte San Martín, S.J. (December 3, 1924 – August 23, 1935)
- Vicars Apostolic of Anhui 安徽 (Roman Rite)
  - Bishop Vicente Huarte San Martín, S.J. (April 26, 1922 – December 3, 1924)
