= Archdiocese of Kaifeng =

Roman Catholic archdiocese in China

Coordinates: 34.7972°N 114.3580°E

Archdiocese of Kaifeng Archidioecesis Chaefomensis 天主教开封总教区
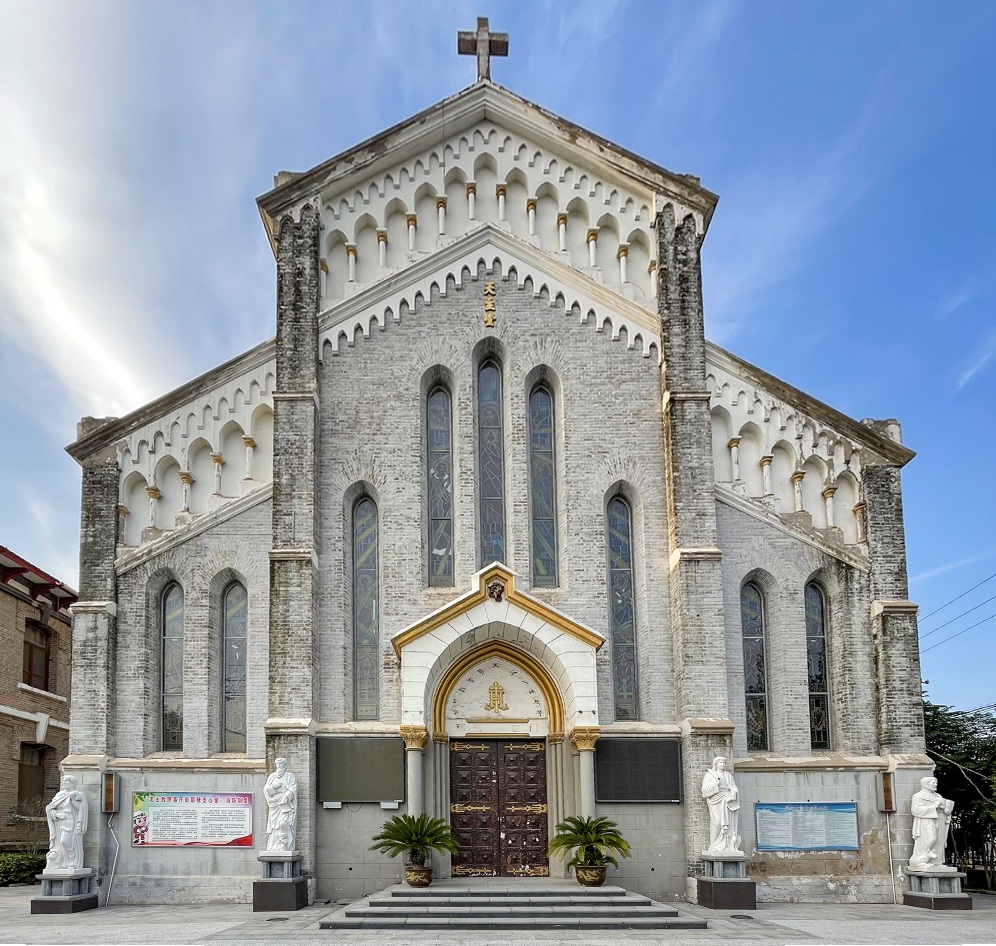
- Sacred Heart Cathedral, Kaifeng

Location
- Country: China
- Ecclesiastical province: Kaifeng

Statistics
- Population: Total; Catholics: (as of 1950); 4,500,000; 18,487 (0.4%)

Information
- Rite: Latin Rite
- Cathedral: Cathedral of the Sacred Heart of Jesus in Kaifeng

Current leadership
- Pope: Leo XIV
- Metropolitan Archbishop: Sede vacante

The Roman Catholic Archdiocese of Kaifeng (Latin: Chaefomen(sis), simplified Chinese: 开封; traditional Chinese: 開封; pinyin: Kāifēng) is an archdiocese located in the city of Kaifeng in Henan province, China.

== History ==
- September 21, 1916: Established as Apostolic Vicariate of Eastern Honan from the Apostolic Vicariate of Northern Honan and Apostolic Vicariate of Southern Honan
- December 3, 1924: Renamed as Apostolic Vicariate of Kaifengfu
- April 11, 1946: Promoted as Metropolitan Archdiocese of Kaifeng

== Leadership ==
- Archbishops of Kaifeng (開封) (Roman rite)
  - Archbishop Joseph Gao Hongxiao, O.F.M. (2007–2022)
  - Archbishop John Baptist Liang Xisheng (1989–2007)
  - Archbishop Gaetano Pollio, P.I.M.E. (December 12, 1946–September 8, 1960)
- Vicars Apostolic of Kaifengfu (開封府) (Roman Rite)
  - Bishop Noè Giuseppe Tacconi, P.I.M.E. (December 3, 1924–1940)
- Vicars Apostolic of Eastern Honan (河南東境) (Roman Rite)
  - Bishop Noè Giuseppe Tacconi, P.I.M.E. (1916–December 3, 1924)

== Suffragan dioceses ==
- Guide (歸德)
- Luoyang (洛陽)
- Nanyang (南陽)
- Weihui (衛輝)
- Xinyang (信陽)
- Zhengzhou (鄭州)
- Zhumadian (駐馬店)

== Sources ==
- GCatholic.org
- Catholic Hierarchy
