= Archdiocese of Anqing =

Roman Catholic archdiocese in Anhui, China

Coordinates: 31.9008°N 117.3110°E

Archdiocese of Anqing Archidioecesis Nganchimensis 天主教安庆总教区
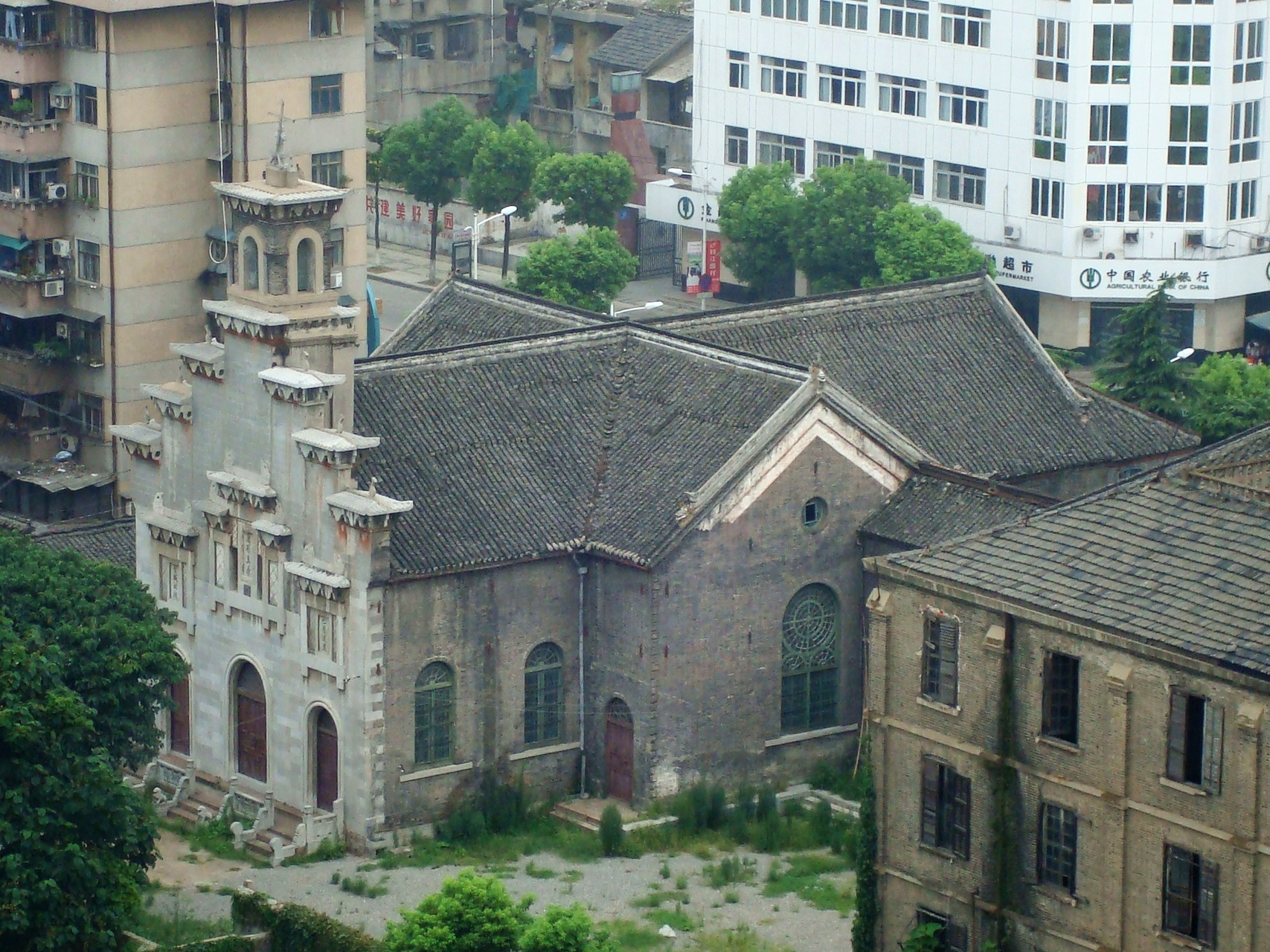
- Former Cathedral of the Sacred Heart in Anqing

Location
- Country: China

Statistics
- Area: 38,000 km^{2} (15,000 sq mi)
- Population: Total; Catholics: (as of 1950); 7,000,000; 28,268 (0.4%)

Information
- Rite: Latin Rite
- Established: 21 February 1929 (As Vicariate Apostolic of Anking); 11 April 1946 (As Archdiocese of Anqing)
- Cathedral: Cathedral of St. Thomas, Hefei

Current leadership
- Pope: Leo XIV
- Archbishop: Joseph Liu Xinhong
- Suffragans: Diocese of Bengbu; Diocese of Wuhu

The Roman Catholic Archdiocese of Anqing 安慶 / Huaining 懷寧 (Wade Giles: Huai-ning / Anking, Latin: Nganchimen(sis)) is an archdiocese located in the city of Anqing in China.

== History ==
- February 21, 1929: Established as Apostolic Vicariate of Anqing from the Apostolic Vicariate of Wuhu 蕪湖
- April 11, 1946: Promoted as Metropolitan Archdiocese of Anqing

== Leadership ==
- Vicar Apostolic of Anqing 安慶 (Roman Rite)
  - Bishop Federico Melendro Gutiérrez, S.J. (February 14, 1930 – April 11, 1946 see below)
- Archbishops of Anqing 安慶 (Roman rite)
  - Archbishop Federico Melendro Gutiérrez, S.J. (see above April 11, 1946 – October 25, 1978)
  - Bishop Joseph Zhu Hua-yu (1997 – February 26, 2005), listed as not in union with the Holy See
  - Bishop Joseph Liu Xinhong (selected 2005; September 22, 2018)

== Suffragan dioceses ==
- Bengbu 蚌埠
- Wuhu 蕪湖

== Sources ==
- GCatholic.org
- Catholic Hierarchy
