= Joseph Gao Hongxiao =

Chinese Catholic prelate (1945–2022)

- Bishop of Kaifeng
- Installed: 23 September 2007
- Term ended: 19 December 2022
- Predecessor: John Baptist Liang Xisheng
- Successor: Vacant

Orders
- Ordination: 1989
- Consecration: 1 January 2005 by John Baptist Liang Xisheng

Personal details
- Born: 1945 China
- Died: 19 December 2022 (aged 77) Meixian, Shaanxi, China
- Denomination: Roman Catholic

Joseph Gao Hongxiao (Chinese: 高宏效; pinyin: Gāo Hóngxiāo; 1945 – 19 December 2022) was a Chinese Catholic prelate who was Bishop of the Roman Catholic Archdiocese of Kaifeng from 2007.

== Biography ==
Gao Hongxiao became a Catholic priest within the Franciscans, and served in the Roman Catholic Diocese of Fengxiang of Shaanxi Province. On October 27, 2000, another pastor, Antonius Zong Changfeng of Zhouzhi (also in Shaanxi), was ordained a coadjutor bishop of Kaifeng, but as the Communist government objected, he did not move to Kaifeng. Thus, he had to continue to work, as if he were a regular priest in Zhouzhi. Since he belonged to the underground church, he also had to stay hidden from time to time. Gao also had to stay hidden. On September 23, 2007, John Baptist Liang Xisheng, died at the age of 84, and Gao automatically became the Bishop.

Gao died on 19 December 2022, at the age of 77.

Catholic Church titles
Previous: John Baptist Liang Xisheng	Bishop of Kaifeng; 2007–2022	Vacant
