= Diocese of Nanyang =

Latin Catholic jurisdiction in China

Diocese of Nanyang Dioecesis Naniamensis 天主教南阳教区

Location
- Country: China
- Ecclesiastical province: Kaifeng

Statistics
- Area: 12,000 km^{2} (4,600 sq mi)
- Population: Total; Catholics: (as of 1950); 4,025,000; 22,807 (0.6%)

Information
- Denomination: Catholic Church
- Sui iuris church: Latin Church
- Rite: Roman Rite
- Cathedral: Cathedral of St Joseph in Nanyang

Current leadership
- Pope: Leo XIV
- Bishop: Peter Jin Lugang
- Metropolitan Archbishop: Joseph Gao Hongxiao

The Diocese of Nanyang (Latin: Naniamen(sis), Chinese: 南陽) is a Latin Church ecclesiastical jurisdiction or diocese of the Catholic Church in China. Its episcopal see is Nanyang, Henan. The diocese is a suffragan in the ecclesiastical province of the metropolitan Archdiocese of Kaifeng.

== History ==
- 1844: Established as Apostolic Vicariate of Honan 河南 from the Diocese of Nanjing 南京
- August 28, 1882: Renamed as Apostolic Vicariate of Southern Honan 河南南境
- December 3, 1924: Renamed as Apostolic Vicariate of Nanyangfu 南陽府
- April 11, 1946: Promoted as Diocese of Nanyang 南陽

== Leadership ==
- Bishops of Nanyang 南陽
  - Bishop Peter Jin Lugang (靳祿崗) 7 May 2020 – Present)
  - Bishop Joseph Zhu Bao-yu (朱宝玉) (30 June 2011 – 7 May 2020)
  - Bishop Joseph Jin De-chen (靳德辰) (1981 – 2011)
  - Bishop Pietro Massa, P.I.M.E. (梅先春) (11 April 1946 – 19 February 1978)
- Vicars Apostolic of Nanyangfu 南陽府
  - Bishop Pietro Massa, P.I.M.E. (梅先春) (29 March 1938 – 11 April 1946)
  - Bishop Flaminio Belotti, P.I.M.E. (包海容) (14 June 1917 – 1937), resigned
- Vicars Apostolic of Southern Honan 河南南境
  - Bishop Simeone Volonteri, P.I.M.E. (安西满) (1 September 1882 – 21 December 1904)
- Vicars Apostolic of Honan 河南
  - Bishop Miguel Navarro, O.F.M. (8 April 1856 – 9 September 1877)
  - Bishop Jean-Henri Baldus, C.M. (安巴都) (2 March 1844 – 1865)
