= Vittorio Riccio =

Italian Dominican missionary, scholar and diploma

The Reverend Vittorio Riccio O.P.
- Church: Roman Catholic Church

Personal details
- Born: January 18, 1621 Fiesole, Florence, Papal States
- Died: February 17, 1685 (aged 64) Parián, Spanish East Indies
- Occupation: Missionary Priest, scholar, and diplomat

Vittorio or Victorio Riccio or Ricci OP (18 January 1621 – 17 February 1685) was an Italian Dominican missionary, scholar and diplomat in the Philippines and south-east China, later named the first Prefect Apostolic of Terra Australis.

== Biography ==
Vittorio Riccio was born in Fiesole, near Florence, in 1621. He joined the Dominican order and taught philosophy in their house of studies in Fiesole. He was recruited for missionary work in the East by Juan Bautista Morales, who sent him to Rome where he successfully argued for pontifical university status to be granted to the Dominican college in Manila, which thus became the University of Santo Tomas, the oldest university in Asia with a European charter.

In 1648 he travelled via Mexico to the Philippines, where he worked with Chinese in the Manila area and learned the Chinese language. In 1655 he transferred to the Dominican mission in Amoy (Xiamen), where he formed a close alliance with Koxinga, the ruler of Fujian. In 1662 he returned to Manila as envoy of Koxinga, conveying his threat to invade the Philippines. The invasion did not take place.

His 1667 account of the Dominican mission in China and its background in Chinese history, Hechos de la orden de predicadores en el imperio de China, remains unpublished, although a transcription is available.

== Prefect Apostolic of Terra Australis ==
In 1676 Riccio, then prior of the St Dominic Monastery in Manila, wrote to the College of Propaganda Fide in Rome on the opportunities for evangelisation in the unknown continent of Terra Australis to the south of the Philippines. Based on reports from Dutch sailors, he enclosed a map showing the continent stretching to the South Pole and beyond. He requested that he be appointed Prefect Apostolic of Terra Australis to initiate missionary activity there.

Communications with Rome were slow but the college appointed him to the position in 1681.

Riccio died in Parián in 1685.

== Sources ==
- González, José María (1955). Un misionero diplomático: vida del Padre Victorio Riccio. Madrid: Ediciones Studium.
