= Alessandro Ciceri =

Alessandro Ciceri may refer to:

- Alessandro Ciceri (sport shooter)
- Alessandro Ciceri (bishop)
