= Alessandro Ciceri (bishop) =

Italian bishop

- Bishop of Nanking
- Church: Catholic Church
- Diocese: Diocese of Nanking
- In office: 1694–1703
- Predecessor: Francisco Spinola
- Successor: Antonio de Silva

Orders
- Consecration: 5 February 1696 by João de Casal

Personal details
- Born: 28 May 1639 Como
- Died: 22 December 1703 (age 64) Nanking

Alessandro Ciceri, S.J. (28 May 1639 – 22 December 1703), also known as Alessandro Cicero, was an Italian Roman Catholic Jesuit who served as Bishop of Nanking (1694–1703).

== Biography ==
Alessandro Ciceri was born in Como on 28 May 1639 and ordained a priest in the Society of Jesus on 10 Oct 1655. He was a relative of Pope Innocent XII. In 1689, he arrived in Asia spending time in Japan and China. He was Superior of the Jesuits in China and was a favorite of the Kangxi Emperor.

At the time, the Holy See had some jurisdictional tensions with the Portuguese crown. The Holy See had a long-established agreement (known as the Padroado) with the Portuguese monarch by which the Vatican delegated the administration of the local churches and granted some theocratic privileges to the Portuguese crown. Until 1659, the whole of China was under the jurisdiction of the Diocese of Macau and hence under the jurisdiction of the Portuguese crown. In 1660, the Propaganda Fide (the Sacred Congregation for the Propagation of the Faith) in Rome established an Apostolic vicariate in Nanking which was under its direct control, upsetting the Portuguese. Pope Alexander VII settled the dispute, to the ire of the Propaganda Fide, by establishing two new dioceses in China (Nanking and Beijing), independent of the Diocese of Macau but under the control of the Padroado. On April 10, 1690, the two dioceses were erected: the current Vicar Apostolic of Nanking, Dominican Gregory Luo Wenzao, was made bishop of Nanking; and Franciscan Bernardino della Chiesa was named bishop to the newly created Diocese of Beijing. Seven provinces were assigned to the Diocese of Nanking and six provinces to the Diocese of Beijing.

In 1690, Pope Alexander VII named Francisco Spinola, a Jesuit, as coadjutor Bishop of Nanking; the nomination was approved by the Portuguese. After Bishop Wenzao's death in 1691, Father Giovanni Francesco Nicolai, a Franciscan, assumed control of the Diocese as administrator with right of succession (In 1688, Wanzao had been granted by the Holy See the right to choose and nominate his successor). Nicolai was not consecrated perhaps due to the fact that the two bishops in China at the time were under the jurisdiction of the Portuguese monarch and Nicolai was named without their approval. Despite the prior nomination of Spinola (who was still en route to China), the King of Portugal, John V, on 3 Oct 1693 selected Ciceri as Bishop of Nanking which was confirmed by Pope Innocent XII on 25 Jan 1694 (Spinola died before reaching China on June 28, 1694). On 5 Feb 1696, Ciceri was consecrated bishop in Macau by João de Casal, Bishop of Macau. While in office, the Chinese Rites controversy continued to divide Catholic leadership in China.

In 1696, after complaints from the Propaganda Fide, Pope Innocent XII reached a new agreement with the Portuguese monarch which limited the jurisdiction of the three dioceses under Portuguese control (Macau, Nanking, Beijing) to two provinces each and allowed the Vatican to establish Apostolic Vicariates under its direct control in the remaining provinces of China. The Diocese of Nanking now consisted of Jiangnan Province (the present day provinces of Anhui, Jiangsu, and Shanghai) and Ho-nan province. Five new vicariates under the jurisdiction of the Propaganda Fide were created.

On 22 Dec 1703, Cerci died in Nanking.

Catholic Church titles
Preceded by Francisco Spinola; Bishop-Elect	Bishop of Nanking; 1694–1703	Succeeded by Antonio de Silva
