= Juan Bautista Morales =

Spanish Dominican missionary (c. 1597–1664)

Juan Bautista Morales (c. 1597 – 17 September 1664) was a Spanish Dominican missionary in China.

== Life ==
Born c. 1597 in Écija, Morales entered the Order of St. Dominic at a very early age, and after devoting some years to missionary work in the Philippine Islands, accompanied in 1633 a band of Dominican missionaries to China, taking up their work in the province of Fujian. Here he took an active part in the Chinese Rites controversy, between the Jesuits on the one side and the Dominicans and Franciscans on the other. The latter maintained that the Jesuits, to make converts, tolerated to a certain extent the cult of Confucius and of ancestors.

They despatched Morales to Rome in 1643, and on 12 September 1645, obtained from Pope Innocent X a decision condemning the methods of the Jesuits. The latter also appealed to Rome, and obtained from Pope Alexander VII a contradictory decree. In 1661 Morales again called the attention of the Holy See to the matter, and in 1669, five years after the death of Morales, Pope Clement IX issued a new decree deciding against the Jesuits. About the same time the Dominicans discovered an enemy in their own ranks in the person of the Chinese friar, Luo Wenzao, Bishop of Basilea, who sent to the Holy See a memorandum favourable to the Jesuits.

While in Italy he recruited Vittorio Riccio, who would conduct extensive missionary work in Manila and south-east China.

He died on 17 September 1664 in Funing.

== Works ==
Among Morales' works are:

- Quaesta xvii a Fr. J.B. de Moralez, missionum sinarum procuratore, proposita Romae 1643 S. Congreg. de Prop. Fide (Rome, 1645)
- Tractatus ad explicandas et elucidandas opiniones et controversias inter Patres Societatis Jesu et religiosos S. Ord. Praed.
- Commentarium super Litanias B. Virginis lingua sinica
- Tractatus ad Dei amorem in voluntate excitandum, lingua sinica
