= Francisco Spinola =

Italian priest

- Bishop-Elect of Nanking
- Church: Catholic Church
- Diocese: Diocese of Nanking
- In office: 1690–1694
- Predecessor: Giovanni Francesco Nicolai
- Successor: Alessandro Ciceri

Personal details
- Born: April 5, 1654 Genoa
- Died: June 28, 1694 (age 40) Cochinchina

Francisco Spinola SJ (April 5, 1654 – June 28, 1694) was an Italian Roman Catholic Jesuit priest who was appointed as Bishop of Nanking. He died before he was able to reach his See and was never consecrated.

== Biography ==
Francisco Spinola was born in Genoa on April 5, 1654, and ordained a priest in the Society of Jesus on June 1, 1673, in Genoa. On October 15, 1689, he made his 3 vows and was named as Spiritual Coadjutator. In 1690, he was named by Pope Alexander VIII as coadjutor Bishop of Nanking to succeed Bishop Gregory Luo Wenzao (Wenzao died in February 1691 and Father Giovanni Francesco Nicolai, who was nominated by Wenzao as his successor under authority granted by the Holy See, would run the diocese in the interim). As Father Nicolai had not been approved by the Portuguese, the appointment of Spinola was accepted by the Portuguese to replace Wenzao as bishop. On August 15, 1690, he made the profession of the Fourth vow, and departed for Portugal. In April 1692, he set sail from Lisbon as the superior to 16 missionaries, only two of which were Portuguese, carrying an introduction letter from the Pope to present to the Chinese emperor.

At the time, the Holy See had some jurisdictional tensions with the Portuguese crown. The Holy See had a long-established agreement (known as the Padroado) with the Portuguese monarch by which the Vatican delegated the administration of the local churches and granted some theocratic privileges to the Portuguese crown. Until 1659, the whole of China was under the jurisdiction of the Diocese of Macau and hence under the jurisdiction of the Portuguese crown. In 1660, the Propaganda Fide (the Sacred Congregation for the Propagation of the Faith) at the Vatican established an Apostolic vicariate in Nanking which was under its direct control, upsetting the Portuguese. Pope Alexander VII settled the dispute, to the ire of the Propaganda Fide, by establishing two new dioceses in China (Nanking and Beijing), independent of the Diocese of Macau but under the control of the Padroado. On April 10, 1690, the two dioceses were erected: the current Vicar Apostolic of Nanking, Dominican Gregory Luo Wenzao, was made bishop of Nanking; and Franciscan Bernardino della Chiesa was named bishop to the newly created Diocese of Beijing. Seven provinces were assigned to the Diocese of Nanking and six provinces to the Diocese of Beijing.

Spinola died while en route in on June 28, 1694, while in Cochinchina. Fellow Jesuit Alessandro Ciceri was named as bishop in 1694.

In 1696, after complaints from the Propaganda Fide, a new agreement was reached with the Portuguese monarch which would allow the Vatican to establish Apostolic Vicariates without the monarchy's support in territories not under the jurisdiction of the three dioceses under Portuguese control (Macau, Nanking, Beijing).

Catholic Church titles
Preceded by Giovanni Francesco Nicolai (Administrator)	Bishop-Elect of Nanking; 1690–1694	Succeeded by Alessandro Ciceri
