= Parián de Manila =

Parián de Manila can refer to:

- Parián (Manila) (also known as the Parián de Arroceros), a colonial-era marketplace and Chinatown in Manila, Philippines
- Parián de Manila in Zócalo, Mexico City (also simply known as the Parián), a colonial-era marketplace named after the marketplace in Manila
