= Wenzao Ursuline University of Languages =

University in Kaohsiung, Taiwan

Coordinates: 22°40′13″N 120°19′08″E

- 文藻外語大學
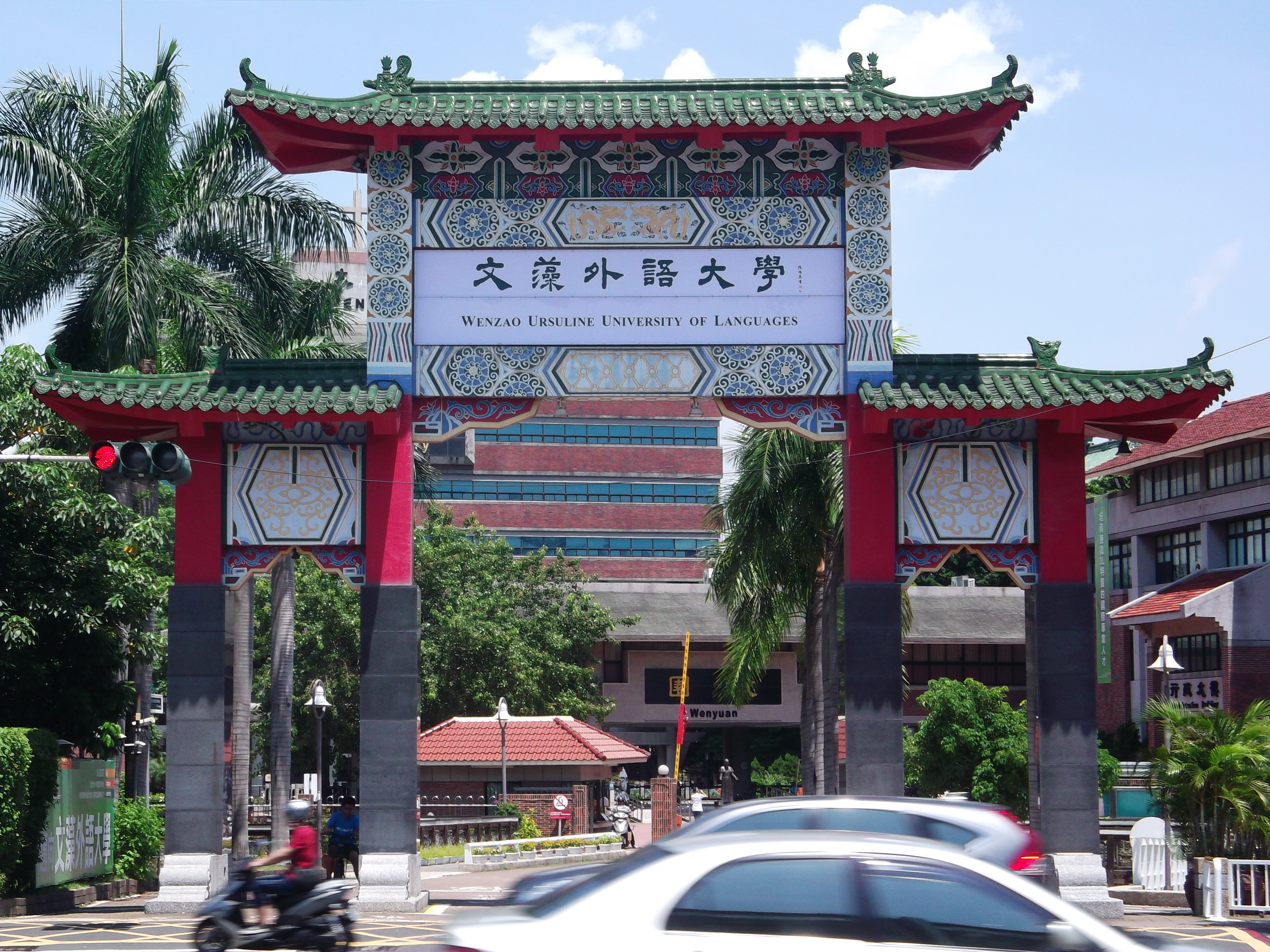
- Motto: Revere the Divine, Love the Human
- Type: Private
- Established: 1966
- Religious affiliation: Sisters of the Roman Union of the Order of St. Ursula
- President: Hwei-Lin Chuang
- Academic staff: 304 (full time)
- Undergraduates: 9000
- Postgraduates: 168
- Location: Sanmin, Kaohsiung, Taiwan
- Campus: Urban
- Colors: Green and yellow
- Website: english.wenzao.tw

Wenzao Ursuline University of Languages
- Traditional Chinese: 文藻外語大學
Transcriptions
Standard Mandarin
- Hanyu Pinyin: Wénzǎo Wàiyǔ Dàxué
Southern Min
- Hokkien POJ: Bûn-chó Gōa-gí Tāi-ha̍k

Wenzao Ursuline University of Languages (WZU; Chinese: 文藻外語大學; Pe̍h-ōe-jī: Bûn-chó Gōa-gí Tāi-ha̍k) is the only university devoted to language education in Taiwan. It awards A.A., B.A., B.B.A. degrees, and offers a master's degree program conferring M.A., M.B.A., and M.F.A. degrees. Students from abroad can get a visa to study Chinese in Taiwan at Wenzao, as it is one of the 63 Chinese language centers accredited by the Ministry of Education. It is a member of the Association of Christian Universities and Colleges in Asia (ACUCA), the Association of Southeast and East Asian Catholic Colleges and Universities (ASEACCU), the International Council of Universities of Saint Thomas Aquinas (ICUSTA), the University Mobility in Asia and the Pacific (UMAP), and the International Association of University Presidents (IAUP).

== History ==
Wenzao Ursuline University of Languages (formerly Wenzao Ursuline College of Languages) was named in honor of Luo Wenzao, the first Chinese bishop.

It was founded in 1966 by the sisters of the Roman Union of the Order of St. Ursula as "Wenzao Ursuline Junior College of Modern Languages". At the beginning of its establishment, admission was only open to female students. In 1980, Wenzao first opened its doors to male students. In 1999, it was officially restructured to become "Wenzao Ursuline College of Languages". It was renamed "Wenzao Ursuline University of Languages" in 2013.

== Colleges and degree programs ==
=== College of International Culture, Education, and Foreign Affairs ===
- Department of English (BA, AA, MA)
- Bachelor's Degree Program of International Business English (BA)
- Department of Translation and Interpreting (BA, MA)
- Bachelor's Degree Program of International Tourism and MICE (BA)
- Department of Foreign Language Instruction (BA)
- Department of International Affairs (BA, MA)
- Center for English Language Teaching
- Center for Teacher Education

=== College of European and Asian Languages ===
- Department of French (BA, AA)
- Department of German (BA, AA)
- Department of Spanish (BA, AA)
- Department of Japanese (BA, AA)
- Department of Southeast Asian Studies (BA, MA))
- Graduate Institute of European Studies (MA)
- European Union Center

=== College of New Media and Management ===
- Department of Digital Content Application and Management (BBA)
- Department of Communication Arts (BA)
- Graduate Institute of Creative Arts Industries (MFA)
- Department of Applied Chinese (BA, MA)
- Department of International Business Administration (BBA, MBA)

=== Ursuline College of Liberal Arts ===
- Center for General Education
- Center for Ursuline Education
- Center for Physical Education

== Department of International Affairs (BA, MA) ==
International Affairs at Wenzao is curriculum developed based on the rise of globalization with a focus on international culture studies, international politics, and international economics. Above 90% of courses in this department are taught in English.

As of 2021, there are 200 Taiwanese students enrolled in the program and 97 international students from over 10 different countries. Students come from: Indonesia, Thailand, Myanmar, Vietnam, Philippines, Australia, China, Japan, South Korea, Russia, Mongolia, Hungary, Netherland, France, UK, Spain, Turkey, Portugal, Nigeria, Somalia, USA, Nicaragua, Saint Vincent, Brazil, Peru, Switzerland, and Germany.

Since the Spring of 2021, the department of International Affairs has published a student-run magazine to showcase student's articles. The first issue was published in July 2021.

== See also ==
- List of universities in Taiwan
