= Carolus Polodig =

Roman Catholic archbishop

Most Reverend Carolus Polodig OCD
- Vicar Apostolic of İzmir; Titular Archbishop of Cyrrhus
- Church: Catholic Church
- Predecessor: Antonio Giustiniani
- Successor: Philippus Bavestrelli

Orders
- Consecration: 28 January 1714 by Francesco Acquaviva d'Aragona

Personal details
- Born: 29 October 1671
- Died: 7 July 1714 (aged 42) İzmir, Turkey

Carolus Polodig (29 October 1671 – 7 July 1714) was a Discalced Carmelite and a prelate of the Roman Catholic Church who served as Vicar Apostolic of İzmir (1713–1714) and Titular Archbishop of Cyrrhus (1713–1714).

== Biography ==
Carolus Polodig was born on 29 October 1671. He entered the Discalced Carmelites and was ordained to priesthood. On 23 December 1713, he was appointed during the papacy of Pope Clement XI as Vicar Apostolic of İzmir and Titular Archbishop of Cyrrhus. On 28 January 1714, he was consecrated bishop by Francesco Acquaviva d'Aragona, Cardinal-Priest of Santa Cecilia, and Giovanni Francesco Nicolai, Titular Bishop of Berytus, and Silvius de Cavalieri, Titular Archbishop of Athenae, serving as co-consecrators. He served as Vicar Apostolic of İzmir until his death on 7 July 1714.

Catholic Church titles
Preceded by Antonio Giustiniani	Vicar Apostolic of İzmir; 1713–1714	Succeeded by Philippus Bavestrelli
Preceded by	Titular Archbishop of Cyrrhus; 1713–1714	Succeeded by John Wallace
