= Giovanni Francesco Nicolai =

Roman Catholic prelate

Most Reverend Giovanni Francesco Nicolai
- Vicar Apostolic of Houkouang; Titular Archbishop of Myra
- Church: Catholic Church
- Diocese: Archdiocese of Hankou
- In office: 1696–1737
- Previous post: Titular Bishop of Berytus (1696–1712)

Orders
- Consecration: 7 Mar 1700 by Sperello Sperelli

Personal details
- Died: 27 December 1737

Giovanni Francesco Nicolai, O.F.M. (died 1737) was a Roman Catholic prelate who served as Vicar Apostolic of Houkouang (1696–1737), Titular Archbishop of Myra (1712–1737), and Titular Bishop of Berytus (1696–1712).

== Biography ==
Giovanni Francesco Nicolai was born in Leonessa, Italy and ordained a priest in the Order of Friars Minor. When the Apostolic Vicariate of Nanking was elevated to a diocese, he was chosen by newly named Bishop Gregory Luo Wenzao as his assistant and successor (on May 29, 1688, the Holy See had granted Wenzao the right to choose and nominate his successor). Upon Wenzao's death on February 27, 1691, he served as administrator of the diocese. On 20 October 1696, he was appointed during the papacy of Pope Innocent XII as the first Vicar Apostolic of Houkouang (the Apostolic Vicariate of Houkouang had been carved out of the Apostolic Vicariate of Fujian in the same year) and Titular Bishop of Berytus. On 7 March 1700, he was consecrated bishop in Rome by Sperello Sperelli, Cardinal-Priest of San Giovanni a Porta Latina, with Odoardo Cibo, Titular Patriarch of Constantinople, and Domenico Belisario de Bellis, Bishop of Molfetta, serving as co-consecrators. On 20 April 1712, he was promoted during the papacy of Pope Clement XI as Titular Archbishop of Myra. He served as Vicar Apostolic of Houkouang until his death on 27 December 1737.

== Episcopal succession ==
Episcopal succession of Giovanni Francesco Nicolai

While bishop, he was the principal co-consecrator of:

- Antonio Rosignoli, Bishop of Arbe (1700);
- Tomaso Giustiniani, Bishop of Chios (1700);
- Vincenzo Lupi, Bishop of Stagno (1703);
- Francesco Paolo Nicolai, Bishop of Capaccio (1704);
- Marco Antonio de Rosa, Bishop of Policastro (1705);
- Bartolomeo Gambadoro, Bishop of Ruvo (1705);
- Raffaele Maria Filamondo, Bishop of Sessa Aurunca (1705);
- Nicola Portoghese, Bishop of Syros e Milos (1710);
- Daniele Sansoni, Bishop of Caorle (1712);
- Carolus Polodig, Vicar Apostolic of Izmir and Titular Archbishop of Cyrrhus (1714);
- Jacques Pescherard, Coadjutor Bishop of Baghdad and Titular Bishop of Berytus (1715);
- Gennaro Scalea, Bishop of Lacedonia (1718);
- Domenico Galisi, Bishop of Lettere-Gragnano (1718);
- Nicola Terzago, Auxiliary Bishop of Ostia-Velletri and Titular Bishop of Samaria (1718);
- Giuseppe Grisconi, Bishop of Vieste (1718);
- Carlo Ambrogio Mezzabarba, Titular Patriarch of Alexandria (1719);
- Pierluigi del Mayo, Bishop of Isola (1722);
- Pietro Savastani, Bishop of Castellammare di Stabia (1722);
- Gaetano Costa de Puerto, Bishop of Crotone (1723);
- Agostino Odoardi, Bishop of Capaccio (1724);
- Giovanni Battista Altieri (iuniore), Titular Archbishop of Tyrus (1724);
- Prospero Lorenzo Lambertini, Titular Archbishop of Teodosia (1724);
- Jean François Fouquet, Titular Bishop of Eleutheropolis in Macedonia (1725);
- Angelico Vigilini, Bishop of Tropea (1728); and
- Antonio Lucci, Bishop of Bovino (1729).

== External links and other references ==
- Cheney, David M. "Myra (Titular See)". Catholic-Hierarchy.org. (for Chronology of Bishops) ^{[self-published]}
- Chow, Gabriel. "Titular Metropolitan See of Myra (Turkey)". GCatholic.org. (for Chronology of Bishops) ^{[self-published]}

Catholic Church titles
Preceded by Gregory Luo Wenzao	Administrator of Nanking; 1691–1694	Succeeded by Francisco Spinola (Bishop-Elect)
Preceded by Manuel Torquemada	Titular Bishop of Berytus; 1696–1712	Succeeded by Jacques Pescherard
Preceded by Prospero Bottini	Titular Archbishop of Myra; 1712–1737	Succeeded by Luigi Gualterio
Preceded by	Vicar Apostolic of Houkouang; 1696–1737	Succeeded by
