= Luo Wenzao =

First Chinese Catholic bishop (d. 1691)

The Most Reverend Luo Wenzao OP
- Bishop of Nanjing
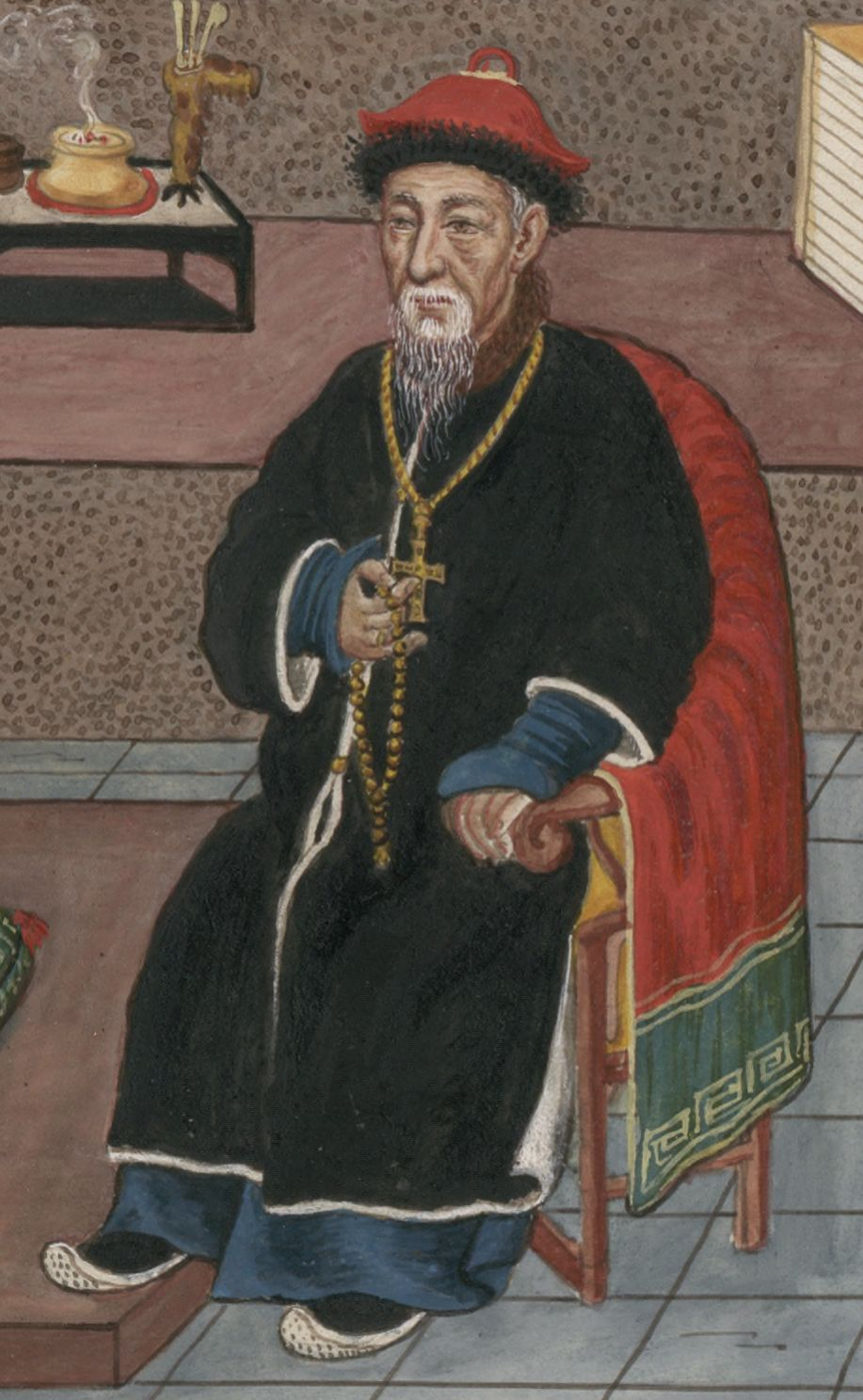
- Portrait of Luo wearing Qing headwear and a crucifix
- Native name: 羅文藻
- Church: Catholic Church
- Diocese: Nanjing
- In office: 1685–1690 (apostolic vicar); 1690–1691 (bishop)
- Successor: Giovanni Francesco Nicolai
- Other post: Titular Bishop of Basilinopolis

Orders
- Ordination: 1654
- Consecration: 1685 by Bernardino della Chiesa

Personal details
- Born: c. 1610s Fu'an, Fujian, China
- Died: 27 February 1691 Nanjing, Jiangsu, China

Chinese name
- Traditional Chinese: 羅文藻
- Simplified Chinese: 罗文藻
Transcriptions
Standard Mandarin
- Hanyu Pinyin: Luó Wénzǎo
- Wade–Giles: Lo^{2} Wên^{2}-tsao^{3}
- IPA: [lwǒ wə̌n.tsàʊ]

Courtesy name
- Chinese: 汝鼎
Transcriptions
Standard Mandarin
- Hanyu Pinyin: Rǔdǐng

Art name
- Chinese: 存鼎
Transcriptions
Standard Mandarin
- Hanyu Pinyin: Wǒcún

Luo Wenzao (Note: Chinese: 羅文藻; pinyin: Luó Wénzǎo (l'woe wun-ts'ow; also spelled Luo Wenzhao (炤), Wenzao Lo, Luo Wencao, and variations of Gregorio Lopez in Western sources.) OP (c. 1610s – 27 February 1691) was the first person of Chinese ethnicity to be appointed as a Catholic bishop. After the Qing dynasty proscribed Christianity and banished foreign missionaries in 1665, Luo became the only person in charge of the Catholic missions in China. In 1674, the Holy See first appointed Luo as a bishop. He declined it but accepted his second appointment in 1679. Due to opposition from Dominicans, he was consecrated as the apostolic vicar of Nanjing in 1685 and held the position until his death in 1691.

Although a Dominican himself, Luo held tolerant views that were closer to those of Jesuits in the Chinese Rites controversy. Luo was an active participant in the controversy: he consecrated Chinese priests and argued for the acceptance of Chinese rituals for the sake of preserving the early Catholic Church in China. Luo had studied at the University of Santo Tomas, Manila, and in addition to his Chinese heritage, Luo was proficient in Spanish and Latin.

Along with other Dominicans, Luo edited Xingshen Shiyi (Chinese: 形神實義; lit. 'The True Meanings of the Body and the Spirit'), a 1673 Chinese Catholic theology book by Raimundo del Valle. Luo also wrote a Latin epitaph in 1690; he is the namesake of Wenzao Ursuline University of Languages, Taiwan. His date of birth is not known and there remains controversy over his real name.

== Naming ==
Many historians agree Luo's given name was Wenzao (文藻), his courtesy name was Ruding (汝鼎), and his art name was Wocun (我存). In 2019, Song Liming proposed Luo's given name was Wenzhao (文炤) and his courtesy name was Zonghua (宗華). According to Song, Luo's name may have been mistaken because Luo's tomb was destroyed in 1862 and because Joseph de La Serviere might have confused Luo with Li Zhizao, another Ming Chinese Catholic, in his book Les Anciennes Missions de la Compagnie de Jésus en Chine, 1552–1814. The 1673 work Xingshen Shiyi by Raimundo del Valle also lists Luo's given name as Wenzhao.

Other sources have romanized Luo's Chinese name differently. The French magazine Le Petit Messager de Ningpo called him "Lo Ngo Chai" in a 1933 issue and "Ngo Ts'uen" in a 1940 issue, according to his art name. Wenzao Ursuline University of Languages calls him "Wenzao Lo". When translating Yan Kejia's text Catholic Church in China, Chen Shujie wrote Luo's name as "Luo Wencao".

Luo was also known as "Gregorio Lopez" in Spanish. He took the baptismal name Gregorio when he was baptized in 1633; upon entering the Dominican novitiate in the Philippines in 1650, his last name was registered as Lopez. A 2017 article by Pablo Robert Moreno uses his Spanish name. The spelling of this name varies across languages: Luo called himself "Gregorius Lopes" in the Latin text of a 1690 stele, and Joseph Tardif de Moidrey called him "Grégoire Lopez" in the 1914 French-language work La hiérarchie catholique en Chine, en Corée et au Japon.

== Early life ==
It is uncertain when Luo Wenzao was born, and sources list different years and dates. Luo Yiming said in a 1997 journal article he was born in either 1611 or 1616. Miguel Angel San Román said: "1615 (or 1616) seems the most probable". Yan Kejia used 1616 in his A Brief History of the Catholic Church in China. In his Biographies of Figures in Chinese Catholic History, Fang Hao said Luo was born in 1617. In 2019, Song Liming said Luo's exact birthdate is 18 October 1617, according to two copies of Luo's epitaph that are stored in the Roman Jesuits Archives.

Many sources agree Luo was born in Fu'an, Fujian. He was born to Buddhist parents but his village had many Christians. His father's name was Li Zhu (Chinese: 李祝) and his mother's last name was Liu (simplified Chinese: 刘; traditional Chinese: 劉).

In 1633, the Dominican missionary Juan Bautista Morales and the Franciscan missionary Antonio Caballero de Santa Maria (Chinese: 利安当) opened in Fu'an. Caballero baptized Luo on 24 September of that year, and Luo took the baptismal name Gregorio, the patron saint of the Franciscan province in the Philippines. In an epitaph Luo wrote for Caballero in 1690, he called Caballero his "spiritual father".

=== Travels and missionary work (1634–1649) ===
After his baptism, Luo first accompanied foreign missionaries on their travels and visits. In 1634, Luo and Caballero reached Nanjing to visit Francesco Sambiasi. However, some Jesuits were concerned that their visit would disrupt Sambiasi's mission, so they kidnapped Luo and Caballero and sent them back to Fujian. Then, in 1635, Luo and the Dominican missionary Francisco Diaz embarked on a trip to Manila to report the Chinese Rites controversy to the Catholic Church, but they were captured by a Dutch group and did not reach Manila. In 1637, Luo went to Beijing with other Dominican priests to explain their mission to the emperor and debate against anti-Christian officials. Johann Adam Schall von Bell intended to introduce him to evangelize in Korea, but Luo was detained when he arrived in Beijing and sent back to Fujian.

Around 1637–1638, Luo and other missionaries went to evangelize in Dingtou (顶头), Fujian. The local Buddhists opposed their Catholic mission. In 1638, Luo and three other Franciscans fled towards Macau but were captured in Ningde. Luo was jailed for 23 days and beaten with clubs. He then went into exile in Macau and Manila in 1639.

In 1640, Luo traveled from Manila to Macau with Dominican priests Juan Bautista Morales and Francisco Diez. (Note: Fang Hao gives the Chinese name of Francisco Diez as "蘇芳積". San Román gives his name as "徐芳濟".) In 1644, Luo left for Manila for the second time with Caballero and several Carmelite nuns. Due to inclement weather, they landed in Thuận Hóa, Vietnam, where Luo was almost killed by locals. The group left Vietnam in early 1645 and arrived in Manila on 20 May of that year. In Manila, Luo was introduced to the Dominicans, and moved to the Dominican convent, and later the University of Santo Tomas. In a 1689 letter to the Propaganda Fide, Luo said he studied Spanish and Latin in Manila, and his theology was worse than other subjects. In 1647, Domingo González sent Luo back to China to take provisions to the missionaries there.

In 1649, when Morales and Caballero returned to China, Luo met them in Anhai, Fujian, despite the ongoing war between Ming and Qing in the province. When Caballero decided to evangelize in Korea, Luo accompanied him to Beijing.

== Dominican Order and priesthood ==
On 1 January 1650, in Fu'an, Luo became a novice of the Dominican Order and received the habit. He made the simple profession on the feast day of St. Thomas Aquinas in 1651. In 1652, he evangelized in Fujian, building a church and a Dominican office in Tingzhou. According to Fang Hao, based on the records of the office of the archbishop of Manila, Luo became a full member of the Dominican Order in Manila in 1654, and became a priest on 4 July in the same year. The Chinese community in Manila made a grand celebration for him. (Note: Domingo Fernández Navarrete asserted that Luo was ordained in 1656, and Joseph de Moidrey followed this claim. However, Fang Hao rejected this claim for several reasons: that the records of the office of the archbishop of Manila are more accurate, and that Navarrete made the claim 19 years after the ordination.) Many historians consider Luo to be the first Chinese Catholic priest. However, San Román did not consider Luo to be the first Chinese priest. He claimed that the first one was Dionisio de la Cruz.

=== Missionary work (1655–1673) ===
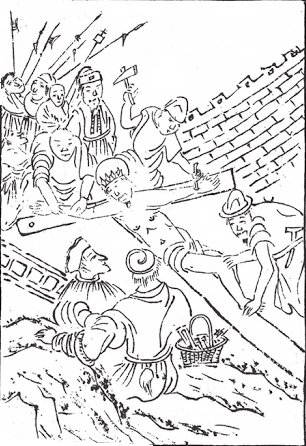
Yang Guangxian depicted the crucifixion of Jesus in his articles attacking Christianity in 1664.

In 1655, the Dominican prior provincial of Manila sent Luo back to China to evangelize. In early July, Luo embarked for Fujian with four other Dominicans, including Raimundo del Valle. Their mission was impacted by the warfare between the Qing regime and Zheng Chenggong. According to San Román, Luo's activity between 1656 and 1664 "has not yet been sufficiently researched". According to San Román, Luo stayed in Fujian in this period, where he administered sacraments, rescued captives during the war, and baptized locals. In 1657, Luo appeared in Xiamen with Vittorio Ricci to assist the arrival of some foreign missionaries. Luo was in Quanzhou in 1658.

In 1664, Yang Guangxian attacked Catholic Christianity in his articles to the imperial court. In 1665, the Qing imperial court accepted his argument, proscribed Christianity, and banished all foreign missionaries to Guangzhou (Canton). Some missionaries hid and could not conduct their missions in public. Since Luo was not a foreign missionary, he remained free in China and became the sole person in charge of the Catholic mission during the proscription from 1665 to 1671.

In May 1665, Luo went to Manila to report the destruction of the Catholic mission in China to the Dominican prior provincial, and sought economic support from the Dominicans, the Franciscans, and the Jesuits. When he returned to China, he first visited Francisco Varo and five other missionaries who were hiding in Shandong. After returning to Fujian, he went to Guangzhou and Macau to visit the banished foreign missionaries. Around 1667, Luo visited 178 churches in the provinces of Fujian, Zhejiang, Jiangxi, Guangdong, Shanxi, Shandong, Sichuan, Jiangsu, Anhui, and Hebei. He baptized 556 people in Fujian and the adjacent coastal region, and about 2,000 people in other provinces. (Note: Zhang Kai claimed that Luo baptized a total of about 2,000 people in several provinces, and he baptized 556 people on an island in Fujian.) The Jesuit visitor of Macau Luis da Gama reported Luo's ministry in 1667 and confirmed it in a 1668 letter:

Last year, I informed Your Paternity that a Religious of St. Dominic, named Fr. Gregorio Lopez and Chinese by race, had come over from Manila to Canton [Guangzhou]. By order of his Superiors and with our agreement ... had entered the interior of China with the intention of cultivating their and our christianities ... Some months later we learned that he reached Peking and talked with our Fathers. From there, he visited his and our christianities with great success and spiritual fruit of numerous souls that were in extreme need of someone to administer to them the sacraments, particularly of Confession and Holy Communion. (Note: Translated by Francis A. Rouleau from Portuguese original.)

== Process of becoming a bishop ==
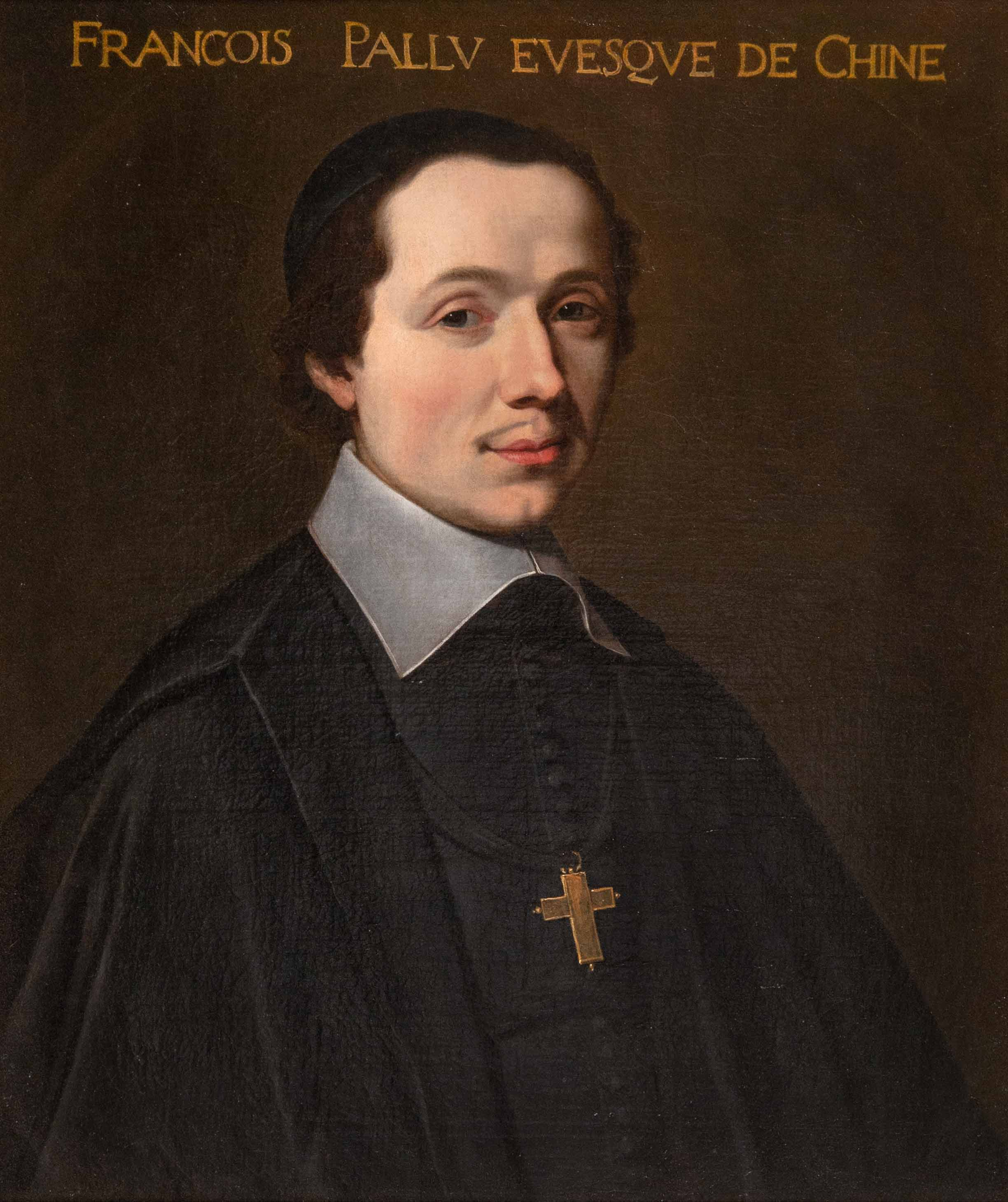
François Pallu (1626–1684) recommended Luo to be appointed as a bishop. Pallu wished to consecrate Luo after Luo received his second appointment, but he died on 29 October 1684, two days before Luo's arrival.

Luo received recommendations from several members of the clergy. François Pallu and Pierre Lambert de la Motte met Domingo Fernández Navarrete in Madagascar on their way to Vietnam. When they heard of Luo from Navarrete, they wrote to the Pope asking him to appoint Luo as a bishop. Gabriel de Magalhães, the head of the Jesuit missions in China, also thought highly of Luo despite him being a Dominican.

=== First episcopal appointment (1674) ===
On 31 July 1673, the Congregation for the Propagation of the Faith (Propaganda Fide) discussed the possibility of appointing Luo as a bishop. The following month, Navarrete and the associate prior of the Dominican Province of Rome recommended Luo to the Propaganda Fide, respectively. The Propaganda Fide later recommended Luo to the College of Cardinals. On 2 October 1673, the Propaganda Fide resolved to petition the Pope to appoint Luo as a bishop in partibus infidelium.

In 1674, Pope Clement X appointed Luo the titular bishop of Basilinopolis and the apostolic vicar of Nanjing to administrate the provinces of Beijing, Shandong, Shanxi, Henan, Shaanxi, and Korea. The date of his appointment is contested; according to Miguel Angel San Román, Luo's appointment occurred in 1675, based on a letter of Luo to the King of Spain. Joseph de Moidrey said Luo only heard about his appointment in 1677. Luo intended to decline his appointment; in 1677, he wrote to the apostolic vicars of Cochinchina and Siam to ask them to convey his message to Rome, though the vicars first advised him to accept the appointment. In 1677, Luo resigned his appointment because he was not confident enough to take the responsibilities and because his appointment could not succeed without the consent of Portugal, which had the protectorate of missions in China at the time.

According to Zhang Kai, there were several other reasons for Luo's resignation. Zhang said some missionaries would not welcome Luo as a bishop due to their nationalistic sentiments; other foreign missionaries would oppose Luo's appointment because he was considered inferior to them in theology and Latin; Luo's tolerance of traditional Chinese culture was different from the Dominicans' stance in the Chinese Rites controversy; and Luo was under the jurisdiction of the Dominican Province of the Philippines, which was under the protection of Spain so he could not fulfil the appointment without Spain's consent.

Antonius Calderon, the Prior of the Dominican Province of the Philippines, also strongly opposed Luo's appointment because Luo's more-tolerant views on the Chinese Rites controversy differed from Dominican views. If Luo had accepted the appointment, Calderon threatened to expel him from the Dominican Order, recall all the Spanish missionaries from China, and end all subsidies to the Chinese missions. To mitigate the situation, Pallu suggested appointing Francisco Varo as Luo's assistant so Luo's candidacy would be more acceptable to the Dominicans. Varo, however, also opposed Luo's appointment and suggested appointing Juan de Palafox y Mendoza instead.

=== Second episcopal appointment (1679) ===
In 1679, the Propaganda Fide received Luo's resignation. On 12 October, Pope Innocent XI re-appointed Luo through the letter Cum te nuper and requested the Master of the Order of Preachers write to Luo to encourage him to accept. The Master of the Order offered that Luo would be assigned a consultant. These letters arrived in Manila in 1681. In 1680, the Propaganda Fide also appointed Bernadino della Chiesa (Chinese: 伊大任) as the auxiliary of François Pallu, who had become the apostolic vicar of Fujian. The Propaganda Fide gave Bernadino della Chiesa Luo's appointment letter and authorized him to consecrate Luo at any time and place. Della Chiesa, however, was delayed in Siam for a year.

Around the same time, Luo was in Luoyuan, Fujian, where he bought a house and turned it into a church. In 1680, Francisco Varo, who had become Luo's superior, ordered Luo to go to Zhangzhou to restore the mission there, and Luo arrived there in June 1680. He received the second appointment in December 1681; he decided to accept it and to be consecrated in Manila. In a letter to the King of Spain, he said:

I was afflicted with the new order from his Holiness ... I consulted diligently for the advice of my brothers of my holy Religion ... They advised me to do whatever the Head of the Church had ordered me. I accepted, Lord, the dioceses and other obligations as the pontifical Bull reads. Later, I came to this city of Manila to be consecrated. (Note: No poco afligido yo con el nuevo orden de su Santidad y gimiendo de dolor y pena ... luego busque diligente a mis compañeros y hermanos de mi sagrada Religión. ... Vierón la gravedad del empeño, y resolvierón que no podía dejar de obedecer a la Cabeza de la Iglesia, y poner en la primera ocasión en ejecución tan soberanos preceptos. Acepte, Senor, con este parecer el Obispado y demas dignidades, como rezan las Bulas pontificias y luego me puse en camino para esta ciudad de Manila con fines de consagrarme.)

Luo travelled to Manila to be consecrated; he arrived in Guangzhou in 1682 and reached Macau on 3 March 1683. On that day, he wrote a letter to the Propaganda Fide describing the anti-Christian situation in China. He soon sailed for Manila with Pedro de Alarcón, vicar of the Dominicans in China, and arrived there in early May 1683. In Manila, Luo was not immediately consecrated. According to de Moidrey, this was because the papal bull appointing Luo had not reached Madrid and because Luo supported the Chinese Rites. The Dominican prior provincial Calderon sent him to Parián to evangelize to the Chinese community. San Román said some Dominicans in the province also opposed the second appointment of Luo as bishop. According to Zhang Kai, Calderon intended to exile Luo to Cagayan. On 11 June 1684, Luo wrote a lengthy letter to the Propaganda Fide explaining why he was not yet consecrated. He complained Alarcón spoke badly of Luo, that Alarcón said Luo was sympathetic to Jesuits in China and agreed with many Jesuit stances, especially in the Chinese Rites controversy. He then escaped to the Augustinian convent in Intramuros, where he was welcomed.

In July 1684, Luo left for China, hoping to be consecrated by Pallu. He arrived in Muyang, Fujian, on 31 October but Pallu died on 29 October. Upon his death, Pallu expressed the wish to consecrate Luo. Bernadino della Chiesa had arrived in Guangzhou on 27 August 1684 and wrote to Luo, who received the letter in Fujian after Pallu's death. Luo then left for Guangzhou with Charles Maigrot and arrived on 31 March 1685. On 8 April, Luo was consecrated bishop by Bishop Bernardino della Chiesa, becoming the first Chinese Catholic bishop.

== Apostolic vicariate and episcopate ==
After his consecration, Luo appointed Giovanni Francesco Nicolai his secretary and private counselor. (Note: Different sources name Giovanni Francesco Nicolai differently. Fang Hao gives his name as "Juan Francesco de Leonissa". San Román calls him "Giovanni Francesco (Nicolai) da Leonessa".) They left Guangzhou on 10 May 1685 and arrived in Nanjing on 30 June that year. On 1 July, Luo took canonical possession of the apostolic vicariate of Nanjing in the Church of the Fathers of the Society of Jesus. He resided in the Jesuits' house in Nanjing. According to San Román, in 1688, Luo chose Nicolai as his successor.

Luo also visited many places under his jurisdiction. Before 1687, he visited Suzhou, Shanghai, Hangzhou, Wuxi, and Chongming. In 1686 in Hangzhou, he wrote a letter to the Propaganda Fide recounting his studies in Manila and his entry into the Dominican Order. In 1687, Luo visited churches in Jiangnan and Shandong, and in 1690, he revisited Shanghai and Hangzhou, arriving with his auxiliary vicar on 20 July 1690.

On 10 April 1690, the apostolic vicariate of Nanjing was elevated to the diocese of Nanjing. Luo was to be installed as the first bishop of the diocese on 10 April 1691. On 20 August 1690 in Hangzhou, Luo wrote to the Propaganda Fide to recommend Giovanni Francesco Nicolai, his auxiliary, as the successor to the episcopate. On 28 August, he wrote another letter to the Propaganda Fide recounting the situation of his vicariate and offering his opinions on preparation of clergy members. In this letter, he said there were seventeen priests in his vicariate, including thirteen Jesuits and four Franciscans. Seven of them were in Nanjing, five were in Shandong, and five were in Beijing. Luo said the priests were meritorious and pious but there were not enough priests for the laity in his vicariate. Luo also said he was his disappointed there were no missions to Korea, Tartary, Shanxi, Shaanxi, or Henan.

According to Fang Hao, Luo preferred to stay in Hangzhou because the Qiantang River that flows through Hangzhou is an important transportation path connecting Nanjing and Shanghai with the coastal provinces Guangdong and Fujian; because there was a Dominican mission at Lanxi, Zhejiang, near the Qiantang River; because Luo said the Jesuit mission leader in Hangzhou, Prospero Intorcetta, received him well; and because Luo venerated Li Zhizao, an earlier Chinese Catholic from Hangzhou and a member of the Three Pillars of Chinese Catholicism.

=== The Chinese Rites controversy (1686–1690) ===
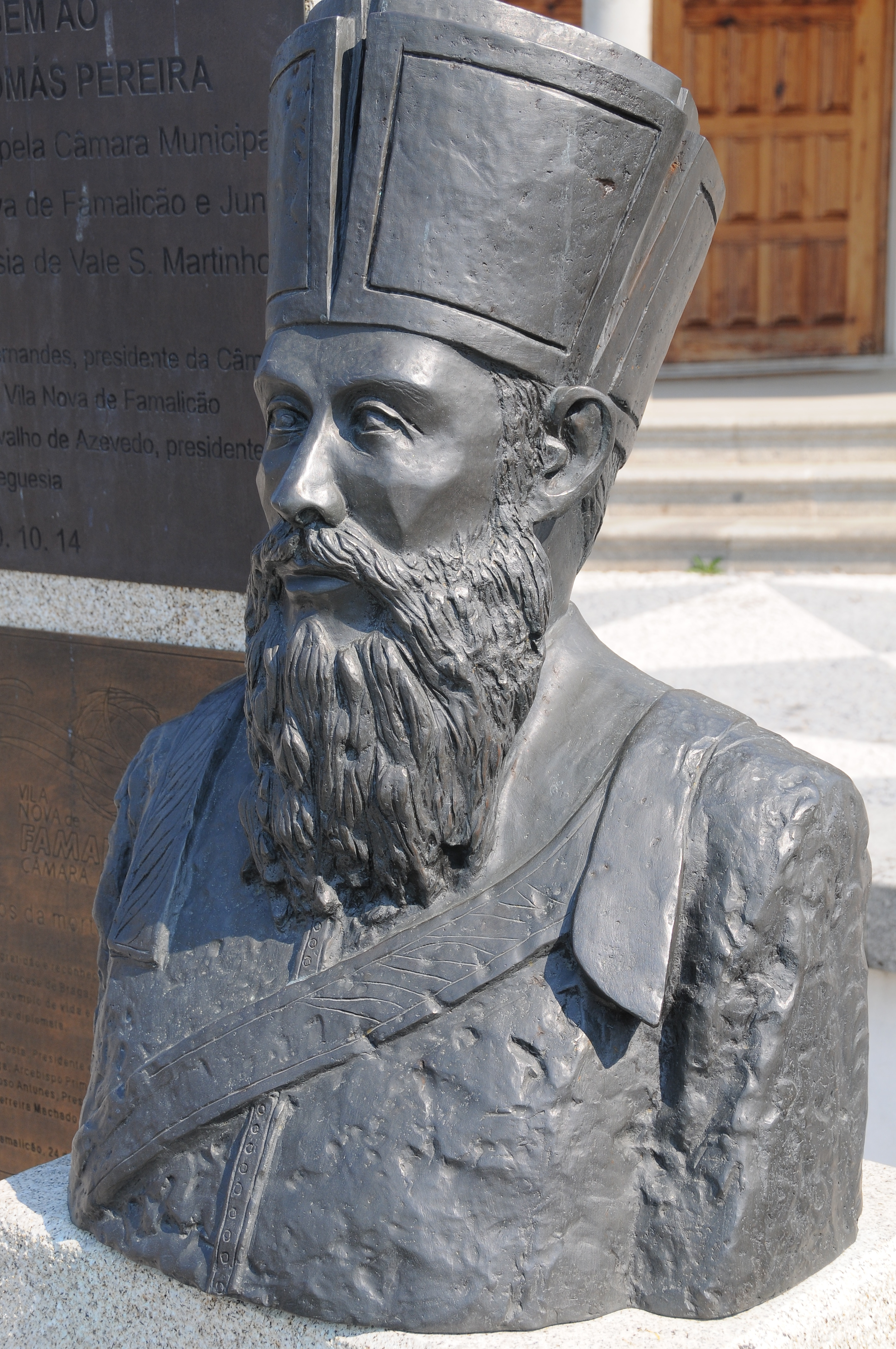
Thomas Pereira (1645–1708) was a Portuguese Jesuit at the court of the Kangxi Emperor.

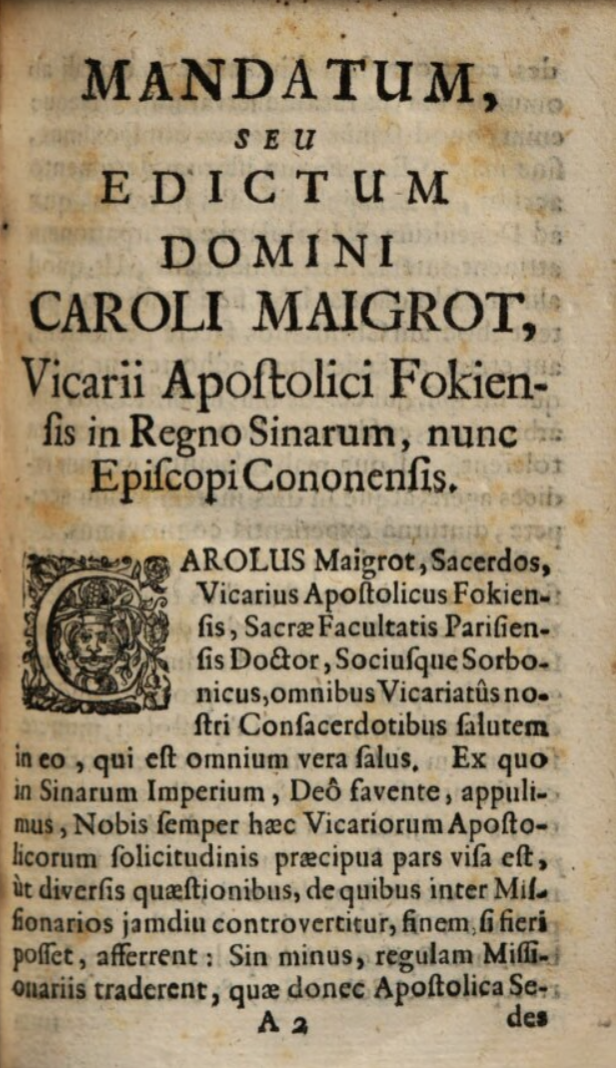
A copy of a mandate published by Charles Maigrot, which forbade missionaries to venerate Confucius or ancestors.

As an apostolic vicar, Luo argued for the policy of accommodation and tolerance in the Chinese Rites controversy. In 1686, Luo wrote a long letter to the Propaganda Fide explaining the origins and meanings of Chinese rituals, and arguing Confucius-honoring ceremonies are not religious. According to Luo's letter to Rome in 1690, he chose Nicolai as his successor in 1688 because Nicolai could read and speak Chinese, understood how to deal with Mandarin bureaucrats, and was familiar with local customs. The King of Portugal, who had the protectorate of missions in China, stopped subsidizing Luo because Luo made his choice without the king's consent but Luo upheld his choice of Nicolai as his successor.

In 1688, Luo consecrated Chinese Jesuits Wu Li, Liu Yunde (Chinese: 劉蘊德), and Wan Qiyuan (Chinese: 萬其淵) as priests. When they were consecrated, Wu was 57, Liu was 69, and Wan was 53. According to Zhang Kai, Luo's preference for senior Chinese laity over younger foreign missionaries shows Luo's decision to "nativize" Catholicism. According to San Román, Wu Li later accompanied Luo in his pastoral visits.

==== The French Jesuits and the oath of obedience (1687–1688) ====
In Luo's time, the Propaganda Fide required foreign missionaries to take an oath of obedience to the apostolic vicars of their location. According to Luo's description, the oath included renunciation of the veneration of Confucius and ancestors, and refraining from using Chinese names such as Shangdi or Tian to call God. After Charles Maigrot was consecrated as the apostolic vicar of Fujian on 5 February 1687, he strictly enforced the requirement: a missionary who did not take the oath was not permitted to administer sacraments. Luo and Bernardino della Chiesa did not force missionaries to take the oath.

The issue of the oath was raised upon the arrival of French Jesuits in 1687. In 1685, Louis XIV had sent six French Jesuits to China. Jean de Fontaney, who headed the mission, chose Guy Tachard, Joachim Bouvet, and Claude de Visdelou. Louis XIV had appointed four of them as the "King's Mathematicians"; he "intended them to work under his sole authority", and the title was "a device to avoid the necessity for them to swear allegiance to the king of Portugal", according to Catherine Jami. Fontaney nominated Jesuits; Louis le Comte and Jean-François Gerbillon. In the middle of the journey, Tachard was sent back from Siam to recruit more Jesuit mathematicians. In July 1687, the remaining five missionaries arrived in Ningbo, Zhejiang.

The five missionaries went to the court of the Kangxi Emperor in Beijing and Thomas Pereira tested them on their knowledge. The Kangxi Emperor kept Bouvet and Gerbillon at his court, and allowed de Fontaney, de Visdelou, and le Comte to settle freely in China. The three first headed to Shanxi but de Fontaney arrived at Nanjing on 14 April 1687 and met Luo.

The head of the Jesuits in Zhejiang, Prospero Intorcetta, learned Louis XIV forbade the five missionaries to take an oath to the apostolic vicar: if they had taken the oath, the King would close their seminaries in France. Intorcetta sought Luo's help on the issue of the oath, which was again raised when Simão Martins, the visitor of the Jesuits, wrote to demand the five French Jesuits take the oath. When Pereira received the letter, he suspended the five missionaries' powers and privileges. Maigrot said missionaries who were leaving the apostolic vicariates ought to take the oath but Luo allowed these Jesuit missionaries to administer sacraments without swearing it.

From 1688 to 1689, Luo wrote several letters to Rome about the situation of the dioceses and the issue of the oath. In his letter dated 3 October 1688, he said if the missionaries had to adhere to the oaths of the Propaganda Fide, he would lose over half of the missionaries and most of the believers. Luo acknowledged the authority of the Propaganda Fide on the Chinese Rites controversy but said if clergy members like Maigrot strictly carried out the policy of the oath, the Catholic Church in China would be at risk of destruction, and that missionaries who do not adhere to the oath should be able to administer sacraments.

=== Epitaph for Antonio Caballero (1690) ===
Towards the end of his life, Luo oversaw the repair of Antonio Caballero's tomb. In 1690, he restored the stele and wrote an inscription in Latin:

To the memory of the Reverend Father Antonio a Santa Maria of the Order of the Minorites, who was a truly apostolic servant and superior, who was called to the heavenly fatherland from the exile in Canton [Guangzhou] in the year 1669, on 13 June. Father Gregory Lopes, the Bishop of Basilia and Apostolic Vicar of Nanjing has restored the tomb for his spiritual father and has erected this stele as a monument of gratitude. (Note: The inscription text is A.R. P. F. ANTONIO A S. MARIA ORDINIS MINORUM, MINISTRO ET PRAEFECTO VERE APOSTOLICO AB EXILIO CANTONENSI AD COELESTEM PATRIAM EVOCATO ANNO M.D.C.LXIX DECIMO TERTIO KALENDAS IUNII FR. GREGORIUS LOPES, EPISCOPUS BASILITANUS ET VICARIUS APOSTOLICUS NANKIM, PATRI SUO SPIRITUALI, RESTAURATO SEPULCRO, LAPIDEM HUNC GRATITUDINIS MONUMENTUM EREXIT according to Leeb. De Moidrey gave a slightly different text of inscription. His source was Philippe François Zéphirin Guillemin. In his book, the text reads: "A. R. P. F. Antonio a S. Maria Ordinis minorum Ministro et Præfecto vere apostolico ab exilio cantonensi ad cœlestem patriam evocato an MDCLXIX XIII kal. junii F. Gregorius Lopez Episcopus Basilitanus et Vie. Apostolicus Nankini Patri suo spirituali restaurato sepulcro lapidem hunc gratitudinis monu- mentum [sic] erexit.")

In his work Christians in China, 600–2000, J.P. Charbonnier called Luo's work a "fine epitaph". Leopold Leeb said Luo's epitaph is probably the first epitaph made by a Chinese person for a foreigner.

== Death ==
Luo's successor Nicolai wrote a detailed account of Luo's death to the Propaganda Fide. According to Nicolai, Luo became ill in late October 1690 while he was visiting churches in Songjiang. His illness worsened when he arrived in Shanghai but he returned to Nanjing without having fully recovered. Due to exhaustion, Luo developed liver and stomach problems. According to Nicolai, when Luo realized his illness was incurable, he stopped taking his medications to save his money for the poor in his episcopate. Luo requested to be buried in his Dominican habit. On 19 December 1690 and 3 January 1691, Luo received the sacraments. He died on 27 February 1691.

On 3 May 1691, Luo was buried at Yuhuatai. At his funeral, Wu Li and other priests who Luo consecrated set up a Chinese memorial altar (Chinese: 灵堂; pinyin: líng táng) for him, and gave offerings to his memorial portrait, according to Chinese rituals and customs. Wu Li also composed a poem titled "Eulogy of Apostolic Vicar Luo" (Chinese: 哭司教羅先生). Gu Yulu said according to Wu's poem, Luo knew theology well enough to preach independently.

Luo's tomb was damaged by floods in 1848–1849, and was destroyed in 1862 during the Taiping Rebellion. After the rebellion, the tomb was moved to Yuhuatai and integrated into a new collective tomb for missionaries. According to Louis Gaillard in 1889, the new tombstone had only the name "Gregorio Lopez" and the Chinese character "Luo" with no further information.

== Legacy ==
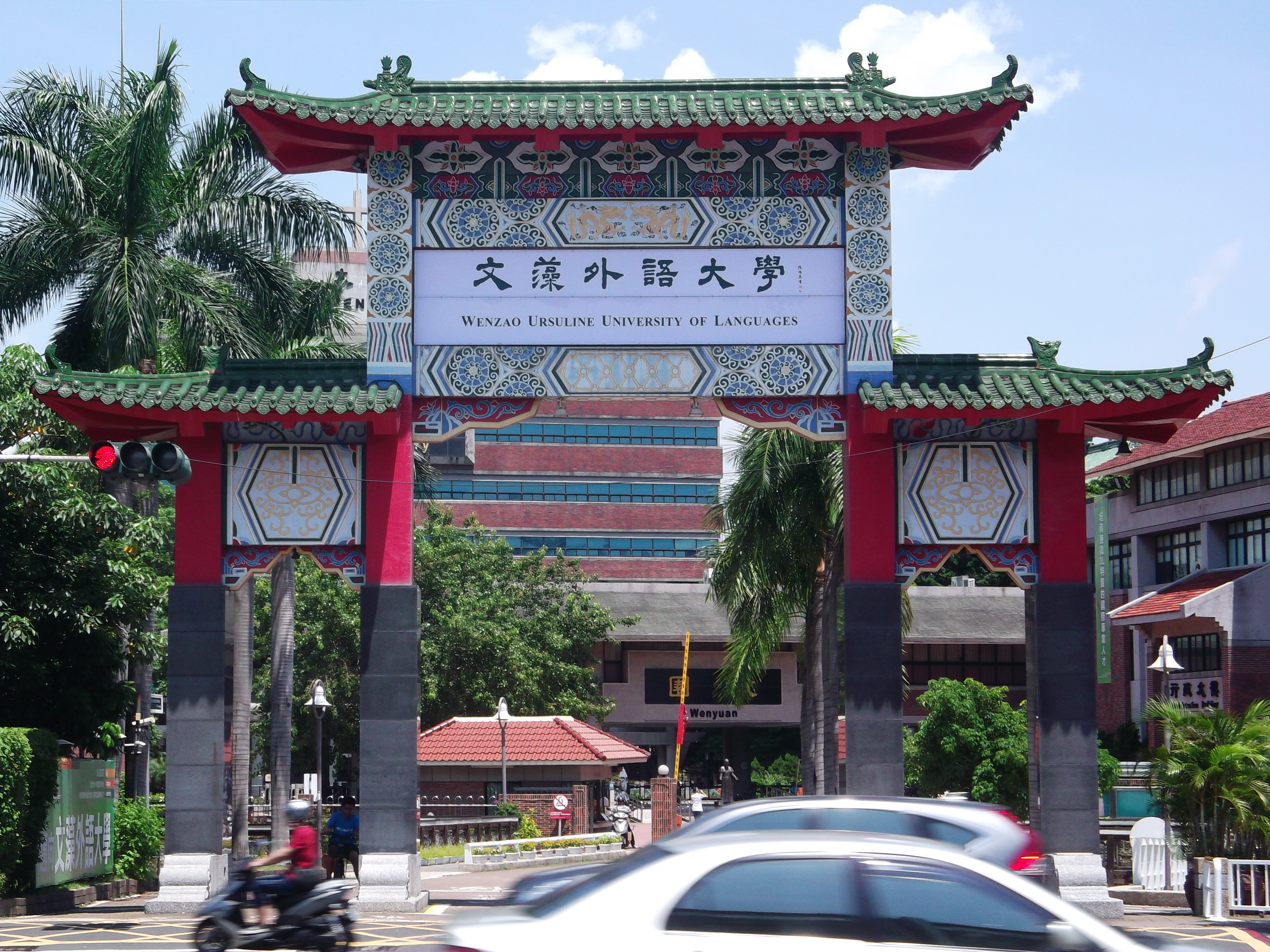
The main gate of Wenzao Ursuline University of Languages, Taiwan

In 1673, Raimundo del Valle published Xingshen Shiyi (Chinese: 形神實義; lit. 'The True Meanings of the Body and the Spirit') at Changxi, Fujian. The book was edited by Luo and Dominican priests Francisco Varo, Domingo Fernández Navarrete, and Domingo Sarpetri. In 1746, due to a clash between the local government of Fu'an and the Catholic Church, the Qing government banned Xing Shen Shi Yi but the book is preserved and included in Chinese Christian texts from the National Library of France.

In 1928, Theodore Labrador Fraile, the apostolic vicar of Funing, established St. Joseph's Seminary in Luojiang (罗江), Fu'an, Fujian. The seminary was later renamed Wenzao Seminary (Chinese: 文藻修院; pinyin: Wénzǎo Xiūyuàn); it stopped functioning in 1949. In 1966, when the Ursulines founded Wenzao Ursuline University of Languages in Kaohsiung, Taiwan, they chose Luo Wenzao as the university's namesake.

== See also ==
- Zheng Manuo, the first Chinese Jesuit priest
- Christianity in Fujian
- List of Catholic missionaries to China

== Notes ==
Catholic Church titles
Preceded by	Titular Bishop of Basilinopolis; 1674–1691	Succeeded by Edme Bélot
Preceded by Ignace Cotolendi	Vicar Apostolic of Nanking; 1685–1690; Bishop of Nanking; 1690–1691	Succeeded by Giovanni Francesco Nicolai (administrator)
