= Basilinopolis =

Titular see

Coordinates: 40°36′24″N 29°33′50″E

Basilinopolis or Basilinoupolis (Greek: Βασιλινούπολις) was a town in Bithynia Prima (civil Diocese of Pontus), which obtained the rank of a city under, or perhaps shortly before, Roman Emperor Julian the Apostate, whose mother was Basilina.

Its exact site is not known. W. M. Ramsay, placed it on the western side of the Lake of Nicaea, near Pazarköy, between Kios (now Gemlik) and Nicaea (Iznik). Modern scholars tentatively identify its site near Yalakdere in Kocaeli Province.

== Bishopric ==
It was a suffragan of the Metropolis of Nicomedia, in the sway of the Patriarchate of Constantinople.

At the Council of Chalcedon (451), the Metropolitans of Nicomedia and Nicaea were in sharp dispute about jurisdiction over the see of Basilinopolis. The council decided to assign it as a suffragan of Nicomedia. It was still reckoned as such in 1170 under Byzantine emperor Manuel Comnenus. The see does not figure in a Notitia episcopatuum of the Ecumenical Patriarchate of Constantinople after the 15th century, probably indicating that the city was destroyed in the Osmanli conquest.

Historically documented bishops were:

- Alexander, first known bishop, was consecrated by John Chrysostom about 400.
- Gerontius (451) partook in the synod of Constantinople in 448 which condemned archimandrite Eutyches and the council of Chalcedon in 451.
- Cyriacus (518) signed the letter after the synod of Constantinople in 518.
- Sisinnius (680) attended the Third Council of Constantinople in 680 and the council in Trullo in 692.
- Georgius (787) was at the Council of Nicaea in 787.
- Anthimus (878) partook in the Council of Constantinople which rehabilitated the Patriarch Photius of Constantinople in 879–880.
- archaeological finds mention bishop Michael, known from an 11th-century episcopal seal.

== Catholic titular see ==
The diocese was nominally restored in no later than the 17th century as Latin titular bishopric of Basilinopolis (Latin; adjective Basilinopolitanus) or Basilinopoli (Curiate Italian).

It is vacant since 1973, having had the following incumbents, all of episcopal rank :

- Luo Wenzao (羅文藻), O.P. (1674.01.03 – 1690.04.10)
- Edme Bélot, M.E.P. (1696.10.20 – 1717.01.02)
- Karl Friedrich von Wendt (1784.06.25 – 1825.01.21)
- John Joseph Hughes (later Archbishop) (1837.08.08 – 1842.12.20)
- François Baudichon (1844.08.14 – 1882.06.11)
- François-Eugène Lions (李萬美), M.E.P. (1871.12.22 – 1893.04.24)
- Karl Ernst Schrod (1894.04.17 – 1914.04.10)
- Pedro Pablo Drinot y Piérola, SS.CC. (1920.10.21 – 1935.09.11)
- Alexandre Poncet, S.M. (1935.11.11 – 1973.09.18)

== Sources and external links ==
Bibliography - ecclesiastical

- Pius Bonifacius Gams, Series episcoporum Ecclesiae Catholicae, Leipzig 1931, p. 443
- Michel Lequien, Oriens christianus in quatuor Patriarchatus digestus, Paris 1740, vol. I, coll. 623-626
- Konrad Eubel, Hierarchia Catholica Medii Aevi, vol. 5, p. 115; vol. 6, p. 117
- Raymond Janin, lemma 'Basilinopolis' in Dictionnaire d'Histoire et de Géographie ecclésiastiques, vol. VI, 1932, coll. 1236-1237
