= Parián =

Chinese immigrant districts during the Spanish colonial period in the Philippines

Pariáns were districts of cities in the Spanish East Indies, particularly in the Philippines, where Chinese immigrants (sangleyes) were required to live by Spanish colonial authorities due to the policy of racial segregation during the Spanish colonial era of the Philippines.

Pariáns were originally pre-colonial marketplaces for selling and buying goods from trading ships. It was adopted by the Spanish as market districts for settlements during the Spanish colonial period of the Philippines, before later becoming a term for sangley enclaves. The term is still used to mean "market" in Mexico.

== Etymology ==
According to historian Resil Mojares, the Philippine Spanish term parián is derived from Cebuano parian ("market", "bazaar", or "an open space for trading"), from the root word pari-pari, meaning "to barter" or "to trade". It originally referred to a market on an estuary in Cebu City where goods from trading ships were unloaded and sold.

The term parian is recorded in both Cebuano and Tagalog in early Spanish dictionaries, all with the meaning of "market or plaza where various things are sold or bought." Other cognates include Ilocano parian, Tausug parian, Maranao padi'an, Maguindanao padian, and Brunei Malay padian, all also meaning "market."

The original meaning of the term is retained in Mexican Spanish, where parián still means "market".

== By country ==
=== Philippines ===
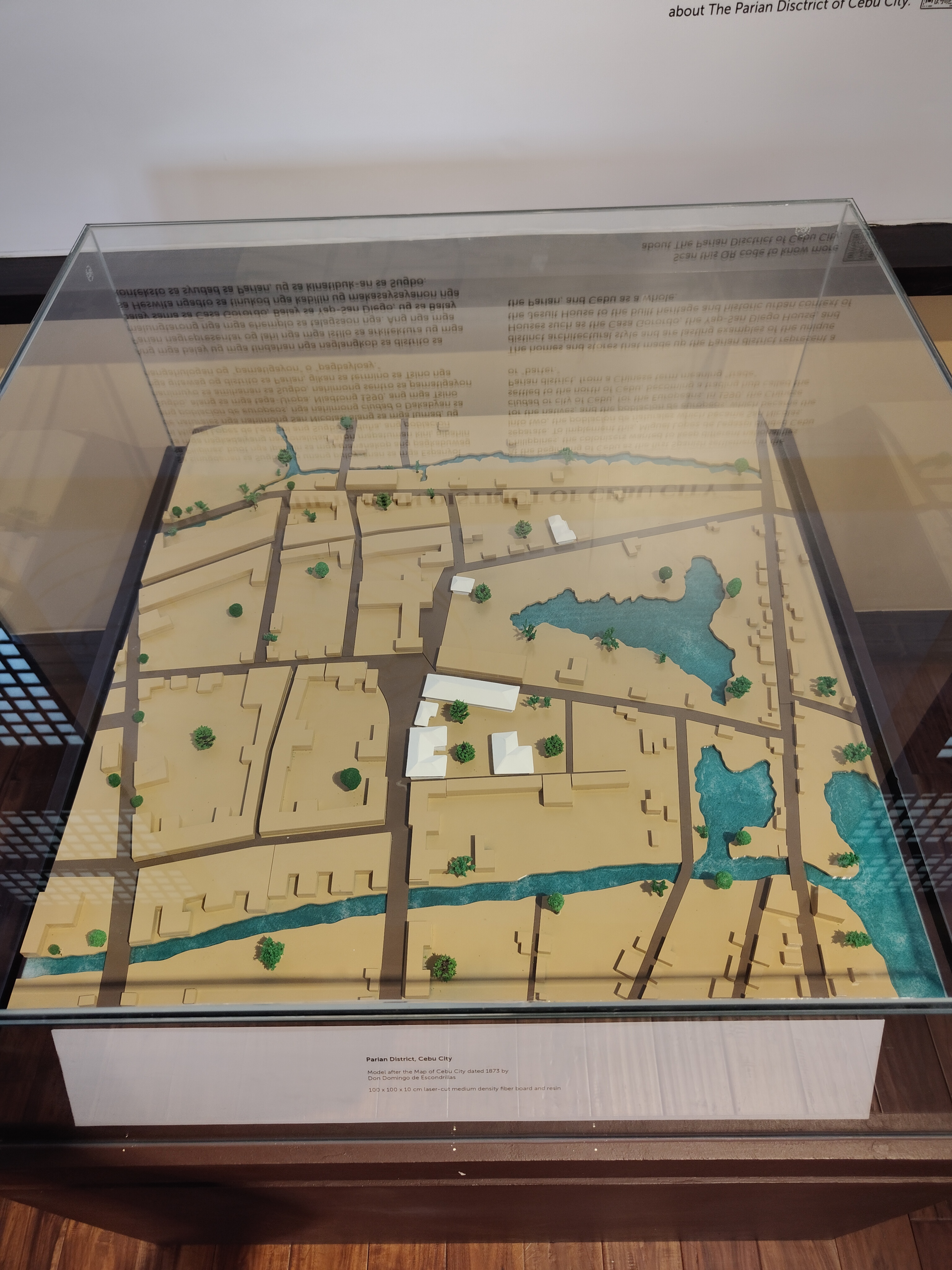
Model of the Parián district of Cebu in the National Museum of the Philippines, after an 1873 map by Don Domingo de Escondrillas

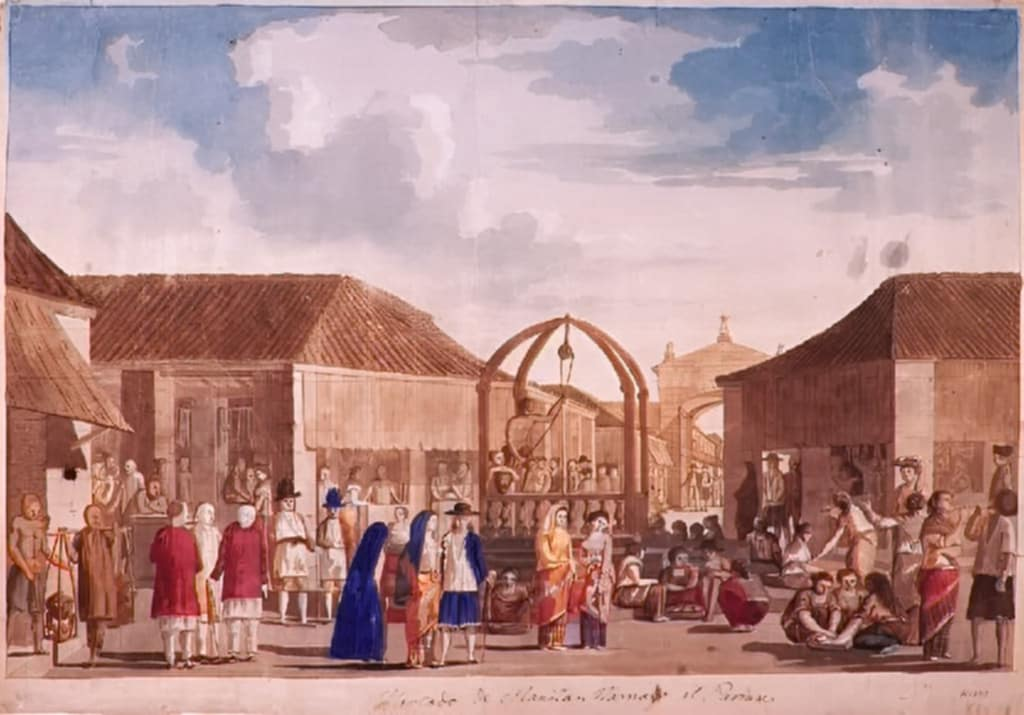
The Parián de Arroceros of Manila, c. 1792

The oldest Parián district in a Spanish-controlled settlement in the Philippines is the Parián of Cebu, which was originally the pre-colonial market of the city. It was connected to the sea by an estuary (the Estero de Parián) and a river running through it (both have since silted over), allowing barges to unload and sell goods from trading ships.

Cebu, the site of the earliest Spanish colonial settlement in the Philippines was racially segregated by the conquistador Miguel López de Legazpi since 1565. He divided the port area of Cebu into two distinct settlements, the Poblacion de Naturales ("Town of the Natives", now Barangay San Nicolas) and the Poblacion de Europeos ("Town of the Europeans", the area surrounding Fort San Pedro) which he named Villa de San Miguel. In 1590, Chinese immigrants (sangleyes) also started to settle in the city. They were restricted from settling in either the native or the Spanish settlements, so they settled in the Parián which was located on the eastern and northern border of the native and Spanish settlements, respectively.

Over time, it became treated as a third district and was assigned its own parish in 1614 under the Jesuits, servicing the Christianized Chinese settlers and natives living in Parián. Unlike the Parián in Manila, its population reverted to being mostly natives and mestizos de sangley by the 17th and 18th centuries. This was mostly due to the economic decline of Cebu City because of the shift of the galleon trade to Manila. It also shifted from being a trading ghetto to becoming a suburban residential district by the 18th century. Today the area is known as Barangay Pari-an.

Following the early Spanish policies of ethnic segregation, there were many other Pariáns throughout the Philippines established during the Spanish colonial era. Originally markets modeled after the Cebu Parián, they became more explicitly ghettoes for Chinese settlers. The most famous among them is the Parián de Arroceros (literally "rice farmers' market") of Manila, which was also originally a market along the Pasig River established in 1581. It also attracted Chinese immigrants, becoming a de facto Chinese enclave. It moved locations within the city from time to time, before finally becoming the modern Binondo Chinatown.

Other Pariáns in the Philippines include the Parián of Iloilo City, which was located in the modern-day city district of Molo; the neighborhood of El Pariancillo in Vigan; the Pariancillo in Malolos which was established in 1755 as a Chinese enclave of Malolos that were from migrants from Manila; the Parian of Mexico, Pampanga, which became the municipality's poblacion; and the Parian in Calamba, Laguna, among others.

=== Taiwan ===
In the short-lived Spanish Formosa (1626-1642), Keelung also used to have a nearby small Chinese trading settlement also known as a Parián, where the first Han Taiwanese of Keelung lived in, many of whom were also sangleyes from Manila and traders from Fujian.

=== Mexico ===
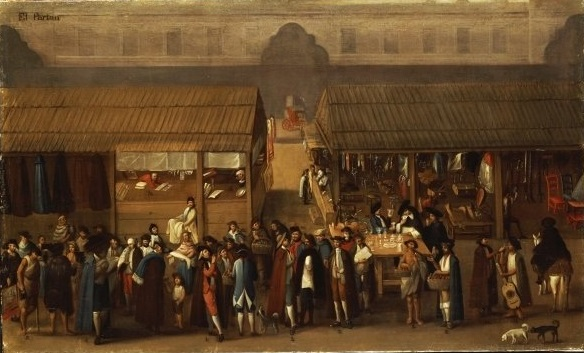
El Parián, an anonymous painting of the Parián de Manila market in the plaza mayor (modern Zócalo) of Mexico City, c. 1770

The term Parián was also carried into Nueva España, where it retained its original Cebuano meaning of "market" in Mexican Spanish. The first Parián in Nueva España was the marketplace of the plaza mayor (modern Zócalo) of Mexico City, which was known the "Parián de Manila" (or simply "Parián" or the "Alcaicería"), named after the silk trading district of Manila in Spanish Philippines.

The Parián was a set of shops in the southwest corner of the plaza used to store and sell luxury and exotic products brought by the Manila galleons from Asia (and later, also luxury goods brought by galleons from Europe). This was opened in 1703 and earned a substantial income for the city council from shop rent, as well as turning the plaza into "an emporium of commerce" and the "center of Mexico's richest trade," as characterized by contemporary accounts. The Parián existed for around 140 years, before it was looted and destroyed during the Parián Riots of 1828.

The name "Parián" is also used for various historical markets in Mexico, like the El Parián handicraft market in Puebla (established in 1760), and the El Parián market of Nochistlán (established in 1886).

== See also ==
- Chinatown
- Ghetto
- Bazaar
- Reductions
