= Parián (Manila) =

Historic district of Manila, Philippines

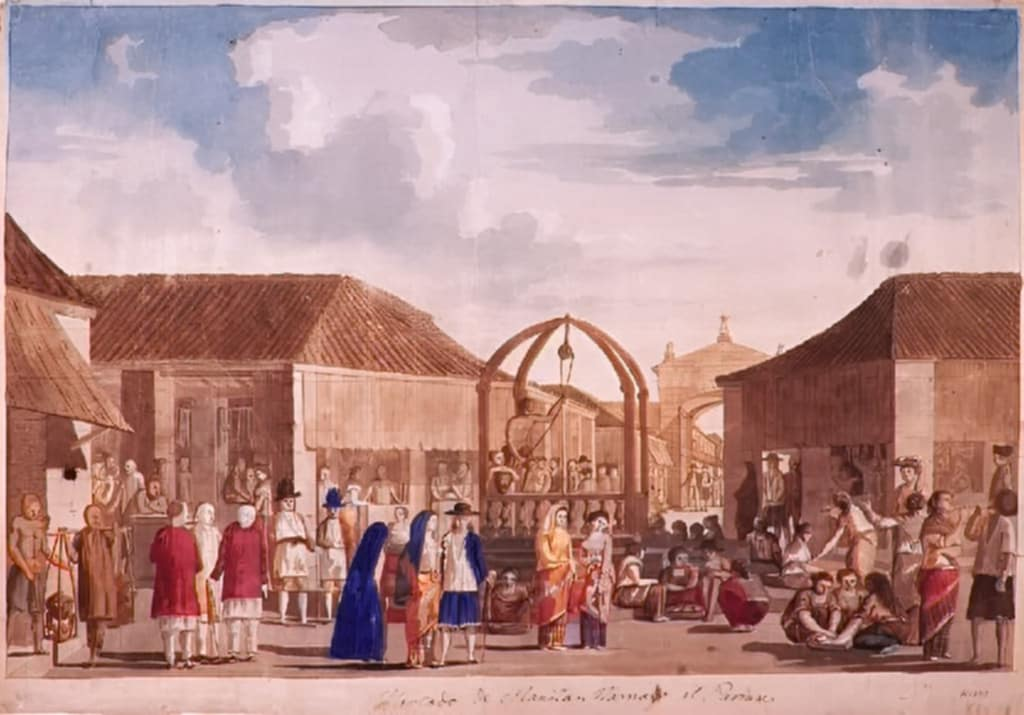
Parian circa 1792

Parián or Pantin, also Parián de Arroceros was an area in Manila adjacent to Intramuros originally built as a market. It later became a Sangley (Chinese) ghetto (a Parián) in the 16th and 17th centuries during the Spanish rule in the Philippines. The place gave its name to the gate connecting it to Intramuros (where most of the Spanish colonial and administrative government was located), the Puerta del Parián.

== History ==
Before the Spanish conquest of Manila in the Battle of Manila (1570), a Sangley Chinese community had already settled in Baybay (modern-day San Nicolas) near Tondo on the north bank of the Pasig river. Around the years after 1581, a place closer to the city south of the Pasig river had been set aside as an open market. This market (known as the "Parián de Arroceros", literally "the rice farmers' market"), rapidly attracted large numbers of traders and craftsmen, most of whom being Chinese immigrants coming from Southern Fujian, where the main port of embarkation at the time was at Haicheng.

As Manila's main market area directly outside the walls of Intramuros, the Parián rapidly became the main commercial center of Manila for centuries. The community had more than a hundred shops comprising the Chinese silk market, small shops of tailors, cobblers, painters, bakers, confectioners, candle makers, silversmiths, apothecaries and other tradesmen.

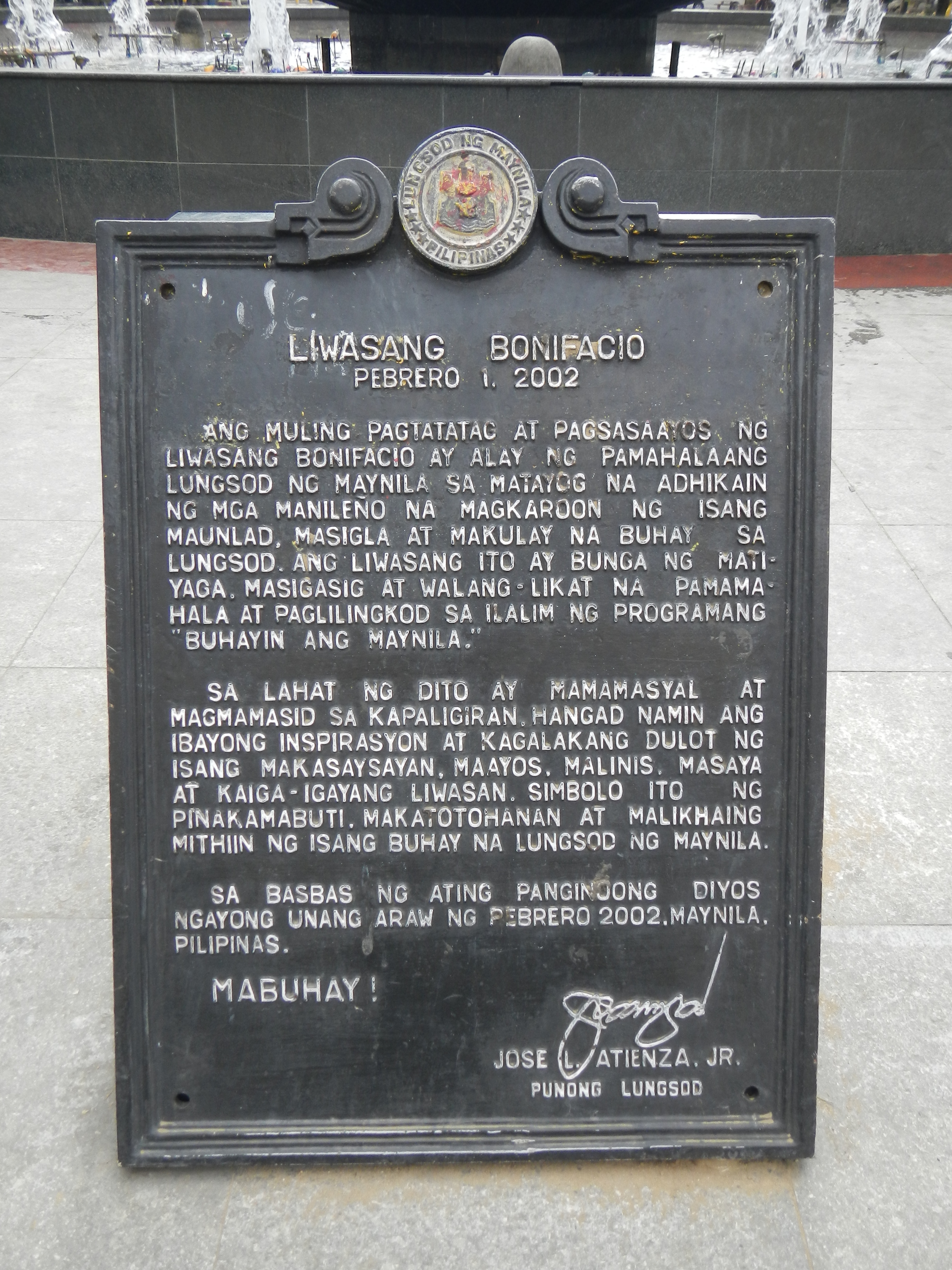
Historical marker by the City at the a former site of Parián, Liwasang Bonifacio, 2002

The location of the Parián moved from time to time and persisted until 1790, when it was torn down to make room for new fortifications on the northern side of Intramuros. The first Parián stood at the current site of the Arroceros Forest Park along the banks of the Pasig River. The second Parián was built in 1583 after the first Parián burned down. The original location is now called Liwasang Bonifacio (formerly Plaza Lawton). The second-to-last Parián was octagonal in shape, and also located beside the Pasig River. The Chinese community was later moved to other districts of Manila north of the Pasig river including Binondo, San Nicolas, Santa Cruz, and Tondo, which these areas are now known as "Manila Chinatown", especially Binondo as its heart. Finally, Binondo became known as Manila's Chinatown district due to its history as the settlement area for Catholic Sangley Chinese residents since the Spanish era.

== Name ==
According to historian Resil Mojares, the Philippine Spanish term parián is derived from Cebuano parian ("market", "bazaar", or "an open space for trading"), from the root word pari-pari, meaning "to barter" or "to trade". It originally referred to a market on an estuary in Cebu City where goods from trading ships were unloaded and sold.

The term parian is recorded in both Cebuano and Tagalog in early Spanish dictionaries, all with the meaning of "market or plaza where various things are sold or bought."

== Current structures ==
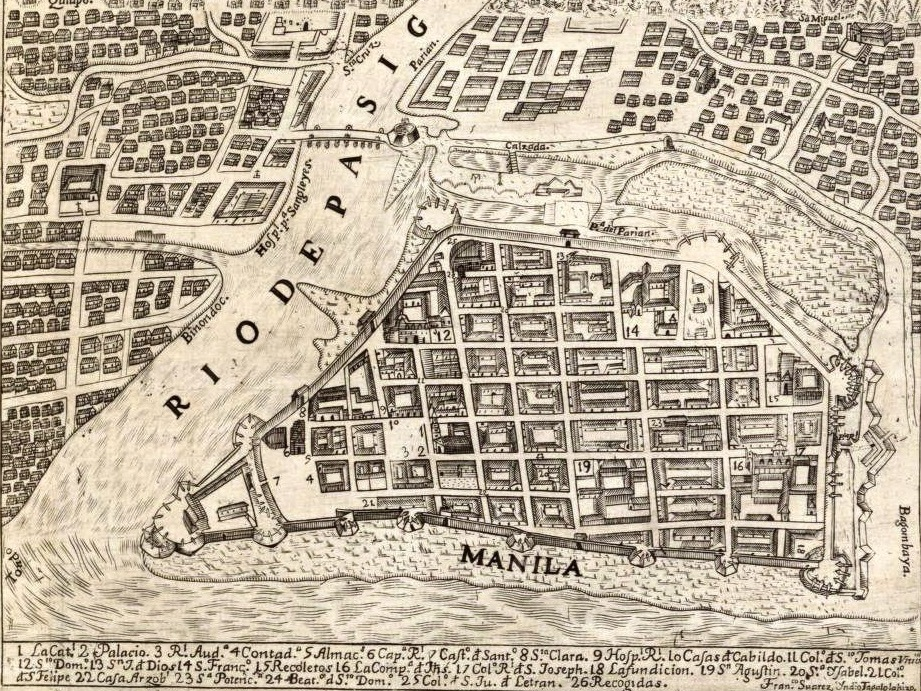
Manila (1734) as depicted in the Velarde Map. Parián is illustrated above.

The modern areas of Liwasang Bonifacio and Arroceros Forest Park in the Ermita district occupy the areas once known as Parián. Part of the land of the former Parián is now occupied by the Manila Metropolitan Theater.

A map of Manila published in 1671 by the Archivo General de Indias shows that the entire area to the northeast between the walls of Intramuros and the Pasig River encompassed Parián.

== Sources ==
- Van der Loon, Piet (1966). "The Manila Incunabula and Early Hokkien Studies, Part 1" (PDF). Asia Major. New Series. 12: 1–43. Archived from the original (PDF) on 2021-02-24.
