= List of Catholic missionaries =

Following is a list of notable Roman Catholic missionaries.

- Gabriele Allegra, O.F.M. – missionary to China to translate the Bible
- Francisco Álvares – Portuguese missionary to Ethiopia.
- Saint Amand – missionary of Flanders
- José de Anchieta – Spanish missionary in Brazil
- Suzanne Aubert – New Zealand nun and missionary to the Māori
- Alexis Bachelot – missionary to Hawaii
- Alonzo de Barcena – missionary and linguist
- Ottavio Barsanti – missionary to New Zealand
- Carlos Filipe Ximenes Belo – missionary in Mozambique
- Jean-Rémy Bessieux – missionary to Gabon and its first bishop
- Giacomo Bini – Franciscan missionary to Rwanda
- Libert H. Boeynaems – missionary to Hawaii
- Luis de Bolaños – missionary who started the Indian Reductions system in Paraguay
- François Bourgade – one of the first Christian missionaries to Muslim North Africa
- Jean de Brébeuf – French Jesuit martyr in Canada who wrote "Huron Carol"
- Luis Cancer – missionary in Hispañola, Central America and Florida
- Saint Daniele Comboni – Italian bishop and missionary to Africa
- Joseph Dalton – missionary to Australia and New Zealand
- Father Damien – missionary to Hawaii known for working with the lepers
- Peter of Saint Joseph de Betancur – Spanish missionary in Guatemala
- Juan de Padilla – missionary who accompanied Coronado
- Alexandre de Rhodes – missionary in Vietnam
- Anton Docher – missionary in New Mexico, defender of the Native Americans
- Louis William Valentine Dubourg – missionary to the United States
- Francis Xavier Ford – missionary to China, martyr and Servant of God
- Joseph Freinademetz – missionary to China
- Joseph Marie Garavel – missionary to New Zealand
- Antoine Garin – missionary to New Zealand
- Jaime Garcia Goulart – missionary to Macau and East Timor
- René Goupil – missionary to what is now Canada
- Évariste Régis Huc – missionary in China
- Isaac Jogues – missionary to what is now Canada
- John of Montecorvino – missionary to China
- Jordanus – missionary to India
- Peter Richard Kenrick – Irish missionary to the United States
- Eusebio Kino – missionary to what is now Baja California, Northwest Mexico, and the southwest United States
- Ferdinand Konščak – missionary to Mexico
- Jean Lampila – missionary to New Zealand
- Adrian Langerwerf – missionary to New Zealand
- Fermín Lasuén – founder of numerous missions in Baja California
- Segundo Llorente – missionary to Alaska
- Jacques Marquette – missionary and explorer in North American
- James McDonald – missionary to New Zealand
- Peter Hildebrand Meienberg – missionary to East Africa
- Victor Mosele – missionary to Sierra Leone
- Saint Ninian – missionary of Scotland
- Marcos de Niza – missionary who accompanied Francisco Vásquez de Coronado to the American South West
- Roberto de Nobili – missionary in India
- Jean-François Nothomb – missionary in Algeria and Venezuela
- Odoric of Pordenone – missionary to China
- Jean Étienne Pezant – missionary to New Zealand
- Jean-Baptiste Pompallier – first Bishop of Auckland, New Zealand
- Ivan Ratkaj – missionary to Mexico
- Matteo Ricci – missionary in China
- John Rodgers – missionary bishop in New Zealand
- Junípero Serra – founded the mission system of what is now California, United States
- Louis Catherin Servant – missionary to New Zealand
- Mother Teresa – missionary to India
- Alessandro Valignano – supervised missions in the Far East, particularly Japan
- Padre Antonio Vieira – missionary to Brazil and South America
- Ivan Vreman – missionary to India and China
- William of Rubruck – missionary to the Mongols
- Francis Xavier – missionary to India and Japan

== See also ==
- List of Catholic missionaries in China
