= List of Catholic missionaries to China =

Catholic missionaries to China listed below span the 13th to the 20th centuries and include members of several religious orders and congregations.

== List ==
- William of Rubruck (1253)
- Giovanni di Monte Corvino O.F.M. (1294)
- Arnold of Cologne (1303)
- Andrew of Perugia (1307)
- Odoric of Pordenone O.F.M. (1322)
- St. Francis Xavier S.J. (1552)
- Michele Ruggieri S.J. (1579)
- Matteo Ricci S.J. (1582)
- Alessandro Valignano S.J. (1570s–1580s)
- Johann Adam Schall von Bell S.J. (1592–1666) - German Jesuit missionary and astronomer
- Alexandre de Rhodes S.J. (1593-1660)
- Andrius Rudamina S.J. (1596-1631) - Lithuanian Jesuit missionary
- Wenceslas Pantaleon Kirwitzer S.J. (1618–1620)
- Ivan Vreman S.J. (1619-1620) - Croatian Jesuit missionary, astronomer and mathematician
- Vittorio Riccio O.P. (1621-1685)
- Ferdinand Verbiest S.J. (1623-1688)
- Martino Martini S.J. (1640–1661)
- Francis Ferdinand de Capillas O.P. (1642–48)
- Thomas Pereira S.J. (1645–1708)
- Matteo Ripa (1682-1746)
- Giuseppe Castiglione S.J. (1688-1766)
- Caspar Castner S.J. (1696–1709)
- Michel Benoist S.J. (1715-1774)
- Jean Joseph Marie Amiot S.J. (1718-1793)
- Theophiel Verbist (1823–1868)
- Armand David C.M. (1826–1900)
- Pierre-Marie-Alphonse Favier C.M. (served 1862–1905)
- Johann Baptist von Anzer S.V.D. (1851–1903)
- Joseph Freinademetz S.V.D. (1852–1908)
- Augustin Henninghaus S.V.D (1862–1939)
- Ephrem Giesen, Franciscan (1868-1919)
- Amandina of Schakkebroek (1872–1900)
- Venerable Gabriele Allegra O.F.M. (1931)
- Prosper Bernard S.J. (1938)

== See also ==
- Catholic Church in China
- List of Catholic missionaries
- 19th-century Protestant missions in China
- List of Protestant missionaries in China
- Christianity in China
- Jesuit China missions
- Religion in China
