= Dumbuya =

Dumbuya is a Sierra Leonean surname that may refer to:

- Ahmed Ramadan Dumbuya, Sierra Leonean politician
- Dora Dumbuya, Sierra Leonean Christian evangelist preacher
- Mustapha Dumbuya (born 1987), Sierra Leonean football defender
- Kahota M.S. Dumbuya, Sierra Leonean military officer
- Sheku Badara Bashiru Dumbuya (born 1945), Sierra Leonean politician
