= Magbema Chiefdom =

Magbema
- Chiefdom
- Interactive map of Magbema
- Country: Sierra Leone
- Province: North West Province
- District: Kambia District
- Capital: Kambia

Population (2004)
  - Total: 67,211
- Time zone: UTC+0 (GMT)

Magbema is a chiefdom in Kambia District of Sierra Leone with a population of 67,211. Its principal town is Kambia.
