= Mosele =

Mosele is a surname. Notable people with the surname include:

- Alexios Mosele (disambiguation), multiple people
- Banjo Mosele (born 1960), Botswana guitarist, singer and composer
- Giacomo Mosele (born 1925), Italian cross-country skier
- Victor Mosele, 20th century American Roman Catholic priest
