= Gbalamuya =

- Location in Sierra Leone
- Coordinates: 9°07′N 12°55′W
- Country: Sierra Leone
- Province: Northern Province
- District: Kambia District

Government
  - Type: Traditional Council
  - Town Chief: Momodu Fofanah
- Time zone: UTC-5 (GMT)

Gbalamuya is a town in Kambia District in the Northern Province of Sierra Leone. Gbalamuya shares international border with the town of Pamelap located in the Republic of Guinea. Gbalamuya is a busy trading, transportation and business center. Gbalamuya is located about 35 miles from Kambia, and about 130 miles northwest of Freetown.

== Demographic ==
The majority of the population of Gbalamuya are members of the Susu ethnic group; though there is a large minority of other ethnic groups.

The overwhelming majority of the population of Gbalamuya is Muslim. The town has a sizable Christian minority population as well. The town chief of Gbalamuya is Momodu Fofanah

On June 5, 2015, Sierra Leone's president Ernest Bai Koroma met the president of Guinea Alpha Conde in Gbalamuya, along the Guinea border as part of a bilateral surveillance and collaboration to end the Ebola virus in Guinea and Sierra Leone.
