= Musele =

Musele or museles may refer to:

- Musele (knife), a throwing knife used in eastern Gabon
- Alexios Musele (disambiguation), list of people with the surname Musele and the given name Alexios
- Museles, a wine produced in Xinjiang, China

== See also ==
- Muselet, a wire cage that fits over the cork of a bottle
- Muscle (disambiguation)
- Mussel
