= Kahota M. S. Dumbuya =

Kahota K.M.S Dumbuya
- Born: Mayafen, Tonko Limba Chiefdom, Kambia District, Sierra Leone
- Died: December 29, 1992; Freetown, Sierra Leone
- Allegiance: Sierra Leone
- Branch: Republic of Sierra Leone Armed Forces
- Spouse(s): Dora Dumbuya (Mammy Dumbuya)

Colonel Kahota M.S. Dumbuya commonly known as K.M.S. Dumbuya was a senior military officer in the Sierra Leone Armed Forces. K.M.S Dumbua was the late husband of the religious Sierra Leonean evangelist preacher Mammy Dumbuya.

When a group of junior military officers in the Sierra Leone Army led by Captain Valentine Strasser seized power in a military coup in April 1992 and overthrew then Sierra Leone's president Joseph Saidu Momoh, Colonel K.M.S. Dumbuya was among many senior military officers arrested, imprisoned and later executed in December 1992, when they were accused of plotting a coup to topple the military junta government.

While in the military, K.M.S. Dumbuya was a well-respected and admired soldier. He was known for professional legal defense of soldiers, as well as professional legal discipline of soldiers who break the military code of conduct.

A native of Kambia District in Northern Sierra Leone, K.M.S. Dumbuya enrolled at Sierra Leone's Fourah Bay College Law School, upon completion of secondary school. He obtained his Bachelor degree in Law at Fourah Bay College, and enlisted in the Sierra Leone Army as a cadet officer. As a soldier, He obtained his Master's degree in Law in military science in the Federal Republic of Nigeria. He obtained yet another degree in Law at the Royal Military Academy in Sandhurst, United Kingdom.

== Early life and education ==
Kahota M.S. Dumbuya was born in the village of Mayafen in Tonko Limba Chiefdom, Kambia District in the Northern Province of Sierra Leone. He was born to parents from the Limba ethnic group. K.M.S. Dumbuya attended the Bubuya Primary School in Bubuya, Tonko Limba Chiefdom. He was later transferred to the Taima Primary School for being one of the most brilliant students Tonko Limba Chiefdom and Kambia District as a whole. He attended secondary school in the capital Freetown where he easily passed his GCE-O'Levels exam and was accepted at the Fourah Bay College, the oldest university in West Africa.

He obtained his Bachelor degree in Law at Fourah Bay College, and enlisted in the Sierra Leone Army as a cadet officer. As a soldier, He obtained his Master's degree in Law in military science in the Federal Republic of Nigeria. He obtained yet another degree in Law at the Royal Military Academy in Sandhurst, United Kingdom.

== Arrest and Execution ==
When a group of junior military officers in the Sierra Leone Army led by Captain Valentine Strasser seized power in a military coup On April 26, 1992 and overthrew then Sierra Leone's president Joseph Saidu Momoh, Colonel K.M.S. Dumbuya was among many senior military officers arrested and imprisoned at the Pademba Road Prison in Freetown. K.M.S. Dumbuya was later executed on December 29, 1992, along with many other senior military and police officers, who were thought to be allies of the ousted president Joseph Saidu Momoh, including Inspector General of Police James Bambay Kamara andColonel Yaya Kanu.

== Personal life ==
Colonel Koyota M.S. Dumbuya was married to the evangelist Christian preacher Dora Dumbuya, widely known as Mammy Dumbuya.

Colonel K.M.S. Dumbuya provided scholarships for many Sierra Leoneans to further their studies.
