= Jesuit Asia missions =

The Jesuits, or Society of Jesus, a Roman Catholic religious order, have had a long history of missions in East and South Asia from their very foundation in the 16th century.

St. Francis Xavier, a friend of St. Ignatius of Loyola and co-founder of the Society, visited India, the Moluques, Japan and died (1552) as he was attempting to enter China.

Fr. Jerome Stanislaus Dsouza, is the Chief of the Jesuit Missions in South Asia.

== See also ==
- Christianity in China
- Christianity in India
- Christianity and the History of the Catholic Church in Japan
- Christianity in Taiwan
- Jesuit China missions
- Pedro Arrupe
- Roberto de Nobili
- Matteo Ricci
- Thomas Stephens (Jesuit)
- Alessandro Valignano
- Ferdinand Verbiest
- Ivan Vreman
- Francis Xavier
