= Visa policy of Sierra Leone =

Policy on permits required to enter Sierra Leone

Visitors to Sierra Leone must obtain an e-Visa unless they are citizens of one of the visa-exempt countries or citizens who may obtain a visa on arrival.

== Visa policy map ==
Sierra Leone Visa not required Free visa on arrival Visa on arrival / eVisa eVisa

== Visa exemption ==
=== Ordinary passports ===
Citizens of the following countries may enter Sierra Leone without a visa or are eligible for a free visa on arrival:

- All ECOWAS member states
- Burkina Faso
- Mali
- Niger

Date of visa changes

Visa-free

- 30 April 1980: ECOWAS: Benin, Burkina Faso, Cape Verde, Gambia, Ghana, Guinea, Guinea-Bissau, Ivory Coast, Liberia, Mali, Niger, Nigeria, Senegal, Togo

Visa on arrival

- 5 September 2019: BRICS countries, Commonwealth countries, European Union countries, Gulf Cooperation Council countries; Bolivia, Cambodia, East Timor, Indonesia, Iran, Israel, Japan, Macau, Norway, Samoa, Singapore, South Korea, Thailand, Turkey, Tuvalu, United Kingdom, United States, Vietnam

=== Non-ordinary passports ===
- A maximum stay of 1 month without a visa is allowed for holders of diplomatic, service and public affairs passports issued to citizens of China.
- A maximum stay of 1 month without a visa is allowed for holders of diplomatic and service passports issued to citizens of Iran.
- A visa exemption agreement for diplomatic and service passports was signed with Rwanda in August 2019, but it has yet to be ratified.

=== Future changes ===
Sierra Leone has signed visa exemption agreements with the following countries, but they have not yet entered into force:

| Country | Passports | Agreement signed on |
|---|---|---|
| Kazakhstan | Diplomatic, service | February 2017 |

== Visa on arrival ==
The government of Sierra Leone began issuing visas on arrival on 5 September 2019.

Citizens of the following countries may obtain a free visa on arrival:

- Barbados
- Botswana
- Eswatini
- Fiji
- Jamaica
- Kenya
- Lesotho
- Malawi
- Malaysia
- Mauritius
- Saint Kitts and Nevis
- Singapore
- Sri Lanka
- Trinidad and Tobago

Citizens of the following countries may obtain a visa on arrival (valid for 1 month) at Freetown International Airport, Jendema (bordering Liberia) and Gbalamuya (bordering Guinea) for a fee 80 USD (unless otherwise noted):

- African Union member states (except ECOWAS, Burkina Faso, Djibouti, Equatorial Guinea, Ethiopia, Mali and Niger)^{1}
- All European Union member states

- Antigua and Barbuda
- Australia
- Bahrain
- Bangladesh
- Belize
- Bolivia
- Brazil
- Brunei
- Cambodia
- Canada
- China
- Dominica
- Fiji^{2}
- Grenada
- Guyana
- Hong Kong
- India
- Indonesia
- Iran
- Israel
- Japan
- Kiribati
- Kuwait
- Lebanon
- Liechtenstein
- Macao
- Nauru
- New Zealand
- Norway
- Oman
- Pakistan
- Papua New Guinea
- Qatar
- Russia
- Samoa
- Saint Lucia
- Saint Vincent and the Grenadines
- Saudi Arabia
- Solomon Islands
- South Korea
- Switzerland
- Thailand
- Timor-Leste
- Tonga
- Turkey
- Tuvalu
- United Arab Emirates
- United Kingdom
- United States
- Vanuatu
- Vietnam

_{1 - Citizens of Botswana, Eswatini, Kenya, Lesotho, Malawi and Mauritius are issued a free visa on arrival. Other eligible African Union citizens are charged 25 USD for a visa issued on arrival.}

== Electronic Visa (e-Visa) ==
Citizens of other countries must obtain an e-Visa. Citizens of countries eligible for a visa on arrival may also obtain their visa online. Citizens of countries eligible for a free visa on arrival do not need to use the platform.

== See also ==
- Visa requirements for Sierra Leonean citizens
