= Masungbala Chiefdom =

Masungbala
- Chiefdom
- Interactive map of Masungbala
- Country: Sierra Leone
- Province: North West Province
- District: Kambia District
- Capital: Kawula

Population (2004)
  - Total: 28,502
- Time zone: UTC+0 (GMT)

Masungbala is a chiefdom in Kambia District of Sierra Leone with a population of 28,502. Its principal town is Kawula.
