= Kandeh Yumkella =

Director General of UNIDO

Kandeh K. Yumkella
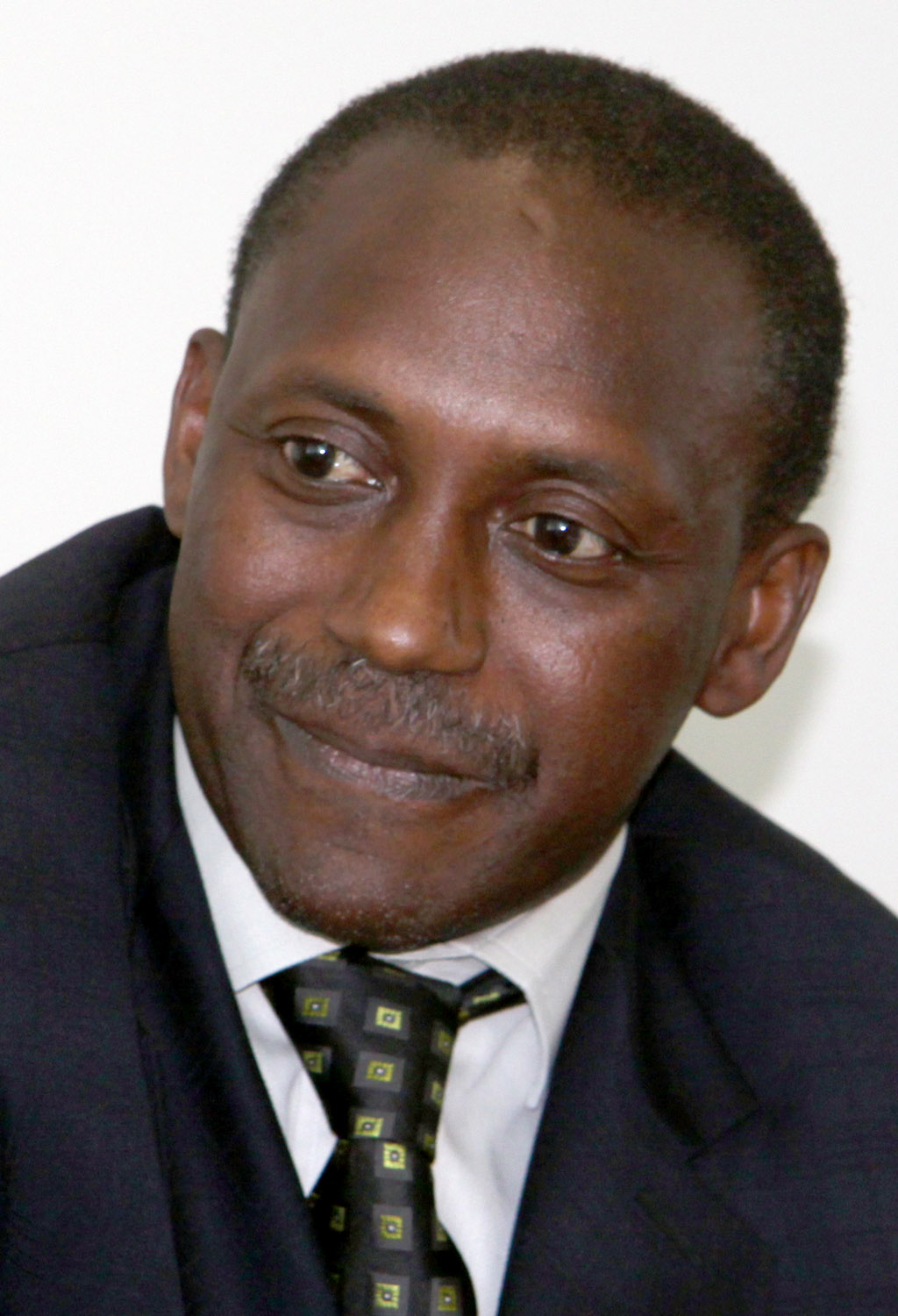
- Photo by Mikhail Evstafiev

Personal details
- Born: 5 July 1959 (age 67) Kychum, Samu Chiefdom, Kambia District, British Sierra Leone
- Party: National Grand Coalition (NGC) New York City
- Spouse: Philomena Yumkella
- Education: Njala University; University of Illinois; Cornell University
- Profession: Agricultural economics
- Religion: Islam
- Ethnicity: Susu
- Website: NGC

Alhaji Kandeh Kolleh Yumkella (born July 5, 1959) is a Sierra Leonean agricultural economist and politician who served as a member of parliament and Chair of the Presidential Initiative on Climate Change, Renewable Energy and Food Security under President Julius Maada Bio's government.

Yumkella is the former United Nations Under-Secretary-General and the Special Representative of the Secretary-General for Sustainable Energy for All. He was also the chief executive officer of the Sustainable Energy for All Initiative. Yumkella is a former chairman of UN-Energy and a two-term former Director-General of the United Nations Industrial Development Organization (UNIDO).

Yumkella contested for the presidency of Sierra Leone in 2018 but garnered 6.9% of the vote.

== Early life and education ==
Kandeh Kolleh Yumkella was born on July 5, 1959, in the rural village of Kychom, Samu Chiefdom, Kambia District in the Northern Province of Sierra Leone. His father, the late paramount chief Alhaji Bai Shebora Yumkella II, was an ethnic Susu and a founding member of the Sierra Leone People's Party (SLPP). His mother Haja Binta Yumkella is an ethnic Fula from Tambakha Chiefdom, Bombali District in Northern Province, Sierra Leone. Kandeh Yumkela's mother Haja Binta Yumkella is the daughter of paramount chief Kandeh Kolleh, the first paramount chief of Tambakha Chiefdom in Bombali District. Kandeh Yumkela was born to very religious Muslim parents in Kambia District, and a devout Muslim himself. Yumkella attended the Christ The King College (CKC) secondary school in Bo.

== Career ==
Yumkella was appointed as Chair of UN-Energy in 2008 by the UN Secretary-General. UN-Energy brings together all the UN organizations dealing with energy issues. As its chairman, Yumkella brought a renewed and vital focus to global energy issues and he helped to coordinate the UN response to energy issues.

In September 2011, Yumkella was appointed by the UN Secretary-General as co-chair of the High-level Group on Sustainable Energy for All. This followed a decision by the UN General Assembly to designate 2012 as the International Year for Sustainable Energy for All. As Co-chair of this High-level Group, Yumkella helps to guide the initiative aimed at highlighting the need for universal access to energy, as well as increased energy efficiency and enhanced deployment of renewable sources of energy.

Yumkella was a Member of the Rio+20 Principals Group, which played a crucial role in the preparations for the 2012 United Nations Conference on Sustainable Development. Since 2008, he has also member of the UN Development Group, which helps to set and coordinate the global development priorities of the United Nations. Under his leadership as Director-General, UNIDO has maintained a role as the largest provider of trade-related technical assistance to developing countries in the UN system.

In September 2012, Secretary-General Ban Ki-moon appointed Yumkella as Special Representative for the Sustainable Energy for All Initiative.

In December 2005, Kandeh K. Yumkella was appointed Director-General of the United Nations Industrial Development Organization (UNIDO), having previously worked in various high-level policy positions in UNIDO. He was re-appointed for a second four-year term in office in December 2009.

== Education ==
- 1992 - Ph.D. Agricultural Economics, University of Illinois
- 1986 - M.Sc. Agricultural Economics, Cornell University
- 1982 - B.Sc. General Agriculture, Njala University College, Sierra Leone
- 1978- Christ the King College, Bo, Sierra Leone

== Career ==
- 1994 to 1995 – Minister for Trade, Industry and State Enterprises of Sierra Leone.
- 1996 Special – Advisor to UNIDO Director-General, Mauricio de Maria y Campos
- 1996 to 2000 – Director of the Africa and Least Developed Countries Regional Bureau, UNIDO
- 2000 to 2003 – UNIDO Representative and Director of the Regional Industrial Development Centre, Nigeria
- 2003 to 2005 – Senior Advisor to UNIDO Director-General, Carlos Alfredo Magariños
- 2005 to 2013 – Director General of UNIDO

== Minister for Trade, Industry and State Enterprises of Sierra Leone ==
As Minister for Trade, Industry and State Enterprises, he successfully promoted market reforms and signed Sierra Leone's accession to the African Regional Standards Organization(ARSO)and launched initiatives to promote private sector development, establishment of public-private sector partnership and dialogue mechanisms.

He organized consultative processes between the government and the private sector for discussing constraints and obstacles to private sector growth with support from UNIDO, International Trade Center(ITC), African Project Development Facility (APDF) and UNDP Regional Bureau For Africa (UNDP/RBA).

As co-chair of the Public Enterprise Reform and Divestiture Commission(the privatization commission), supervised an internal review of the privatization council), supervised an internal review of the privatization program and promoted local awareness-building and domestic private sector participation in the program.

He also served as a member of the ministerial-level structural adjustment monitoring committee which provided oversight on policy reforms dealing with rationalization of the civil service workforce, judicial reform, petroleum product pricing and monetization of the rice subsidy.

== Tenure at UNIDO ==
Yumkella has worked in different high-level policy positions in UNIDO, including as Special Adviser to two previous Directors-General and as Representative and Director of the first UNIDO Regional Office in Nigeria. He is the first from Sub-Saharan Africa to have been appointed to the position. In December 2005, Yumkella was appointed as Director-General of UNIDO, and in December 2009 he was reconfirmed for a second term in office.

== UN-Energy ==
In June 2009, Yumkella was appointed by UN Secretary-General Ban Ki-moon to chair a new Advisory Group on Energy and Climate Change. The members of the Group, comprising international experts, industry leaders and United Nations system representatives, advise on energy issues critical to the new global climate change deal and beyond.

Yumkella is the chairman of UN-Energy, a United Nations system coordination body dealing with energy-related issues.

He is also a member of the China Council of International Cooperation on Environment and Development (CCICED) which Kandeh Yumkella is a prominent public speaker, who addresses global issues, including poverty reduction, climate change, the Millennium Development Goals, as well those related to Africa and the developing world in general, green industry and renewable energy.

Yumkella's opinion pieces have appeared in major international newspapers, including The New York Times, the International Herald Tribune, and The Guardian.

He has also appeared on several international broadcast networks, including CNN's Amanpour programme, BBC, Sky News, Aljazeera and CNBC.

== Awards and honours ==
- Lifetime Achievement Award, Green White & Blue Commission
- Nayudamma Award for outstanding contributions to the energy sector, 13 November 2014
