= Mambolo Chiefdom =

Mambolo
- Chiefdom
- Country: Sierra Leone
- Province: North West Province
- District: Kambia District
- Capital: Mambolo

Population (2004)
  - Total: 33,825
- Time zone: UTC+0 (GMT)

Mambolo is a chiefdom in Kambia District of Sierra Leone with a population of 33,825. Its principal town is Mambolo.
