= Stadtbühne Vohenstrauß =

Theatre company in Leuchtenberg, Bavaria, Germany

Coordinates: 49.599°N 12.261°E

Stadtbühne Vohenstrauß was a theatre company that performed at the Leuchtenberg Castle in Leuchtenberg, Bavaria, Germany.
