= Ballo Wharf =

Place in Northern Province, Sierra Leone

Coordinates: 8°50′N 13°14′W

Ballo Wharf, commonly known as Ballowharf, is a community in the Port Loko District of the North West Province of Sierra Leone, north of the capital Freetown.
