= John Fang Xingyao =

Chinese Roman Catholic Bishop

- Bishop of Yizhou
- Native name: 房兴耀
- Archdiocese: Jinan
- Province: Shandong
- Metropolis: Jinan
- Diocese: Yizhou
- See: Yizhou
- Installed: July 27, 1997
- Predecessor: Charles Weber, S.V.D.

Orders
- Ordination: December 1989
- Consecration: July 27, 1997 by Thomas Zhao Fengwu

Personal details
- Born: June 1953 (age 73) Hedong District, Linyi, Shandong, China
- Denomination: Roman Catholic
- Education: National Seminary of Catholic Church in China

Chinese name
- Traditional Chinese: 房興耀
- Simplified Chinese: 房兴耀
Transcriptions
Standard Mandarin
- Hanyu Pinyin: Fáng Xīngyào

John Fang Xingyao (Chinese: 房兴耀; born June 1951) is a Chinese Roman Catholic Bishop of Roman Catholic Diocese of Shandong, China. He is the current president of the Catholic Patriotic Association.

He was a member of the 9th, 10th and 11th National Committee of the Chinese People's Political Consultative Conference and a member of the 12th and 13th Standing Committee of the Chinese People's Political Consultative Conference.

== Biography ==
Fang was born in June 1951 in Hedong District of Linyi City, Shandong Province. In 1983 he entered the newly founded National Seminary of Catholic Church in China, where he graduated in 1989. In December 1989 he was consecrated as priest in Sacred Heart Cathedral, Jinan, capital of Shandong province. In 1994 he became acting bishop of the Roman Catholic Diocese of Yizhou. He was ordained bishop on July 27, 1997 by the Holy See and the Chinese government. His principal consecrator to become bishop was Thomas Zhao Fengwu. In 2004 he was elected vice-president of the Bishops Conference Of Catholic Church in China (BCCCC). On December 9, 2010, he was elected President of the Catholic Patriotic Association. On August 24, 2011, he was appointed as chairman of the board of the National Seminary of Catholic Church in China. On December 29, 2016, he was re-elected President of the Catholic Patriotic Association.

Catholic Church titles
Previous: Michael Fu Tieshan	President of the Catholic Patriotic Association; 2010–present	Incumbent
