= Wolfram Kuschke =

German politician

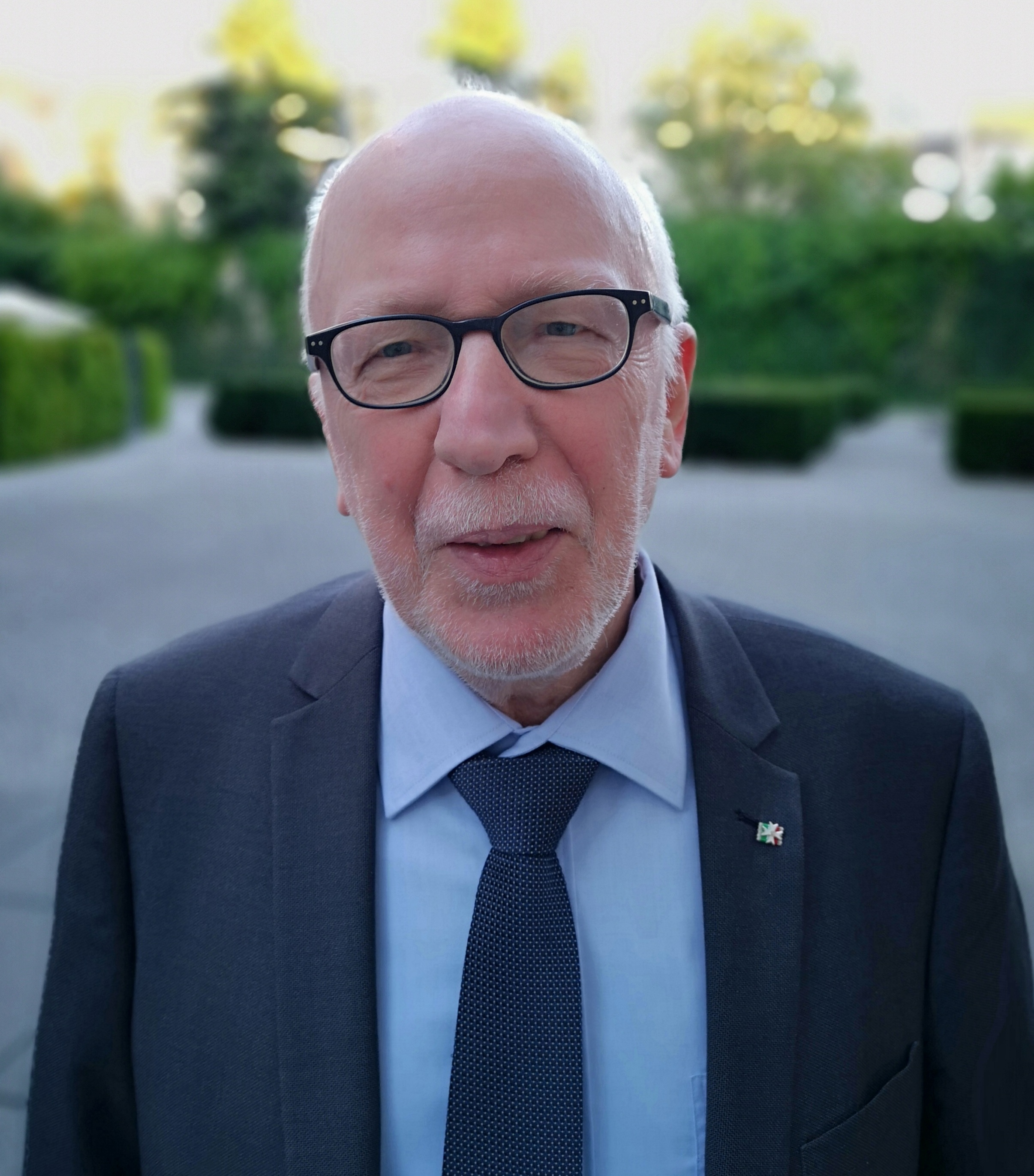
Wolfram Kuschke (2018)

Wolfram Kuschke (born 9 April 1950 in Menden (Sauerland), North Rhine-Westphalia) is a politician. He is a member of the parliament in North Rhine-Westphalia for SPD.

== Political career ==
He started his career in 1972. From 2002 to 2005 he was nominated as a minister (government). Formerly he was the president of Regierungsbezirk Arnsberg (1998–2002).
