= St. Joseph Freinademetz German National Parish, Beijing =

Catholic parish in Beijing, China

St. Joseph Freinademetz Parish is a Catholic national parish based in Beijing, China, which serves German-speakers who either reside in or are visiting China. It was established during the 1980s and is under the patronage of St. Joseph Freinademetz, S.V.D., a missionary to China in the 19th century.

== History of German fellowship in Beijing ==
During the early 1980s Mass was being celebrated in German by the Jesuit priest, Prof. Franz-Anton Neyer, S.J., who was head of the Department of German Studies at Sophia University in Tokyo during the 1980s and 1990s. He would travel to Beijing for each Mass. In 1987, a German-speaking priest became the resident pastor for the Beijing area and began to offer church services in German regularly. The German ambassador, Hanspeter Hellbeck, and his administration team welcomed all German-speaking Catholics warmly in the embassy. In the following year, the parish developed and grew.

Highlights of those early days:

- 1988 first recorded First Holy Communion service with 8 children.
- 1988 establishment of a Bible study group.
- 1990 First Holy Communion was celebrated in St. Michael's church with 10 children.
- 1992 first recorded baptism and confirmation.
- 1996 The Right Reverend Dr. Hubert Luthe, Bishop of Essen, Germany, visited Beijing and confirmed 8 young people.

At the end of the 1990s, the original pastor left and the parish was then served by a Father Birtel, and later a Father Rotermann from Manila, the Philippines. In those hard times, it was even possible to celebrate a first holy communion and offer church services in Beijing frequently.

In 2001 a Pastoral Council was formed and ecumenical collaboration with the German-speaking Protestant Congregation in Beijing, under the leadership of Pastor Heinke, became stronger and stronger. Both churches set up an ecumenical bible study group, an ecumenical choir and an ecumenical Taizé-fellowship group. Several ecumenical church services during the year and organizing an ecumenical Bible Day became common events in the city.

The pastor also attended the Annual Conference of German-speaking clergy in Asia and organized these for about 10 participants during Spring 2010 in Beijing. Further highlight during the history:

- 2006 visit of Monsignor Prassel, who announced that the parish would be put under the patronage of the newly canonized Saint Joseph Freinademetz.
- 2009 visit of Archbishop Dr. Ludwig Schick from Bamberg, Germany, leading a delegation of German bishops. He confirmed 11 young people in the course of his visit.
- 2009 The Reverend Michael-Heinrich Bauer was assigned to Beijing, serving German-speaking congregations in both Shanghai and Beijing.
- 2010 Bauer gave 16 children their First Holy Communion and confirmed 7 young people. In the same year 2 people were baptized.

=== Recent activities of the congregation ===
The major goals for the founding of the Parish of St. Joseph Freinademetz are both being the religious home for German-speaking Catholics in Beijing and providing a bit of German culture in China. It is a bridgehead and contact point for all foreigners visiting Beijing or living and working in the municipal area.

The parish offers Mass every second Saturday evening in the German embassy. But the other catholic sacraments are offered to German-speaking foreigners. Every autumn groups with candidates for first holy communion and confirmation were formed. Baptism, wedding, confession and extreme unction are offered on demand after contact with our father Michael-Heinrich Bauer. Furthermore, the congregation participates at the cultural life in Beijing's German community.

The parish's patron Joseph Freinademetz came to China during the 19th century as a missionary and bore witness for Jesus Christ, in particularly in Shandong Province, dying while nursing victims of an outbreak of typhus. The parish commits to his tradition intends to stay together in harmony with other Christian congregations in China, and to follow up ecumenism. Therefore, the parish maintains strong relations with the German Protestant church in Beijing, with the local Archbishop of Beijing, with several other Catholic congregations of foreigners in Beijing and other Christian congregations in China.

Finally St. Joseph Freinademetz Parish matches the requirements of the Chinese government on religious activities.
