= Diocese of Yanzhou =

Roman Catholic diocese in China

Diocese of Yanzhou Dioecesis Ienceuvensis 天主教兖州教区
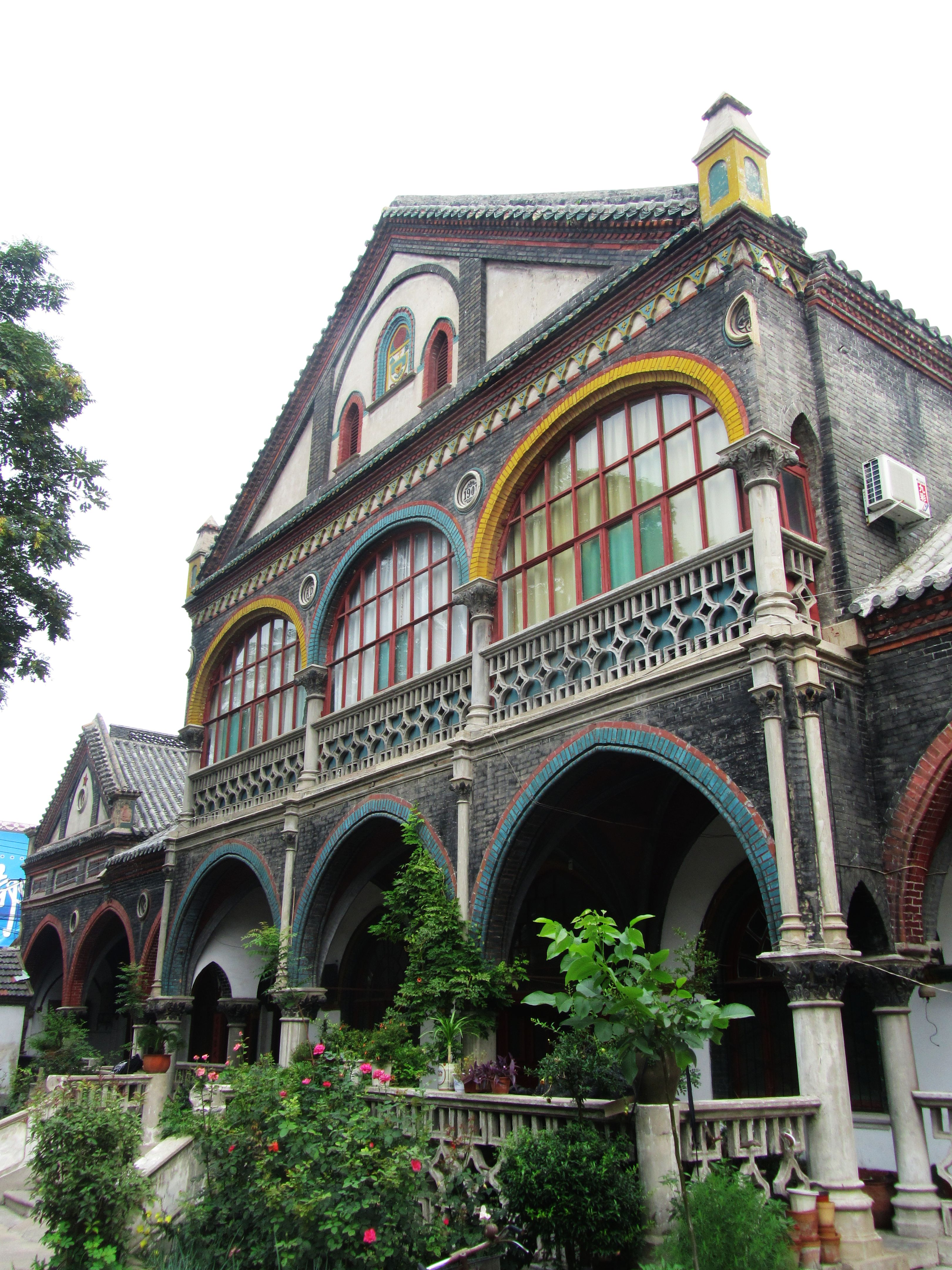
- Cathedral of the Holy Spirit

Location
- Country: China
- Ecclesiastical province: Jinan
- Metropolitan: Jinan

Statistics
- Area: 25,000 km^{2} (9,700 sq mi)

Information
- Rite: Latin Rite
- Cathedral: Cathedral of the Holy Spirit in Yanzhou

Current leadership
- Pope: Leo XIV
- Bishop: John Lu Pei-sen
- Metropolitan Archbishop: Joseph Zhang Xianwang

The Roman Catholic Diocese of Yanzhou/Yenchow (Latin: Ienceuven(sis), Chinese: 兖州) is a diocese located in Yanzhou (Shandong) in the ecclesiastical province of Jinan in China. The cathedral is now in the hands of the Patriotic Church of China.

== History ==
- December 2, 1885: Established as Apostolic Vicariate of Southern Shantung 山東南境 from the Apostolic Vicariate of Shantung 山東
- December 3, 1924: Renamed as Apostolic Vicariate of Yanzhoufu 兖州府
- April 11, 1946: Promoted as Diocese of Yanzhou 兖州

== Leadership ==
- Bishops of Yanzhou 兖州 (Roman rite)
  - Bishop John Lu Pei-sen, (2011–present)
  - Bishop Thomas Zhao Fengwu, S.V.D. (1993 - 2005)
  - Bishop Theodore Schu, S.V.D. (舒德祿) (April 11, 1946 – August 24, 1965)
- Vicars Apostolic of Yanzhoufu 兖州府 (Roman Rite)
  - Bishop Theodore Schu, S.V.D. (舒德祿) (November 19, 1936 – April 11, 1946)
  - Bishop Augustin Henninghaus, S.V.D. (August 7, 1904 – June 1935)
- Vicars Apostolic of Southern Shantung 山東南境 (Roman Rite)
  - Bishop Johann Baptist von Anzer, S.V.D. (January 4, 1886 – November 24, 1903)
