= Muscle (disambiguation) =

A muscle is a contractile tissue in an animal's body used especially for movement composed of muscle or muscle tissue. In this sense it can refer to:

- Skeletal muscle, the voluntary muscle allowing conscious movement in vertebrates
- Smooth muscle, the muscle of the internal organs of vertebrates, and throughout many invertebrates
- Cardiac muscle, the specialized muscle of the heart

Muscle or muscles may also refer to:

== Arts and entertainment ==
- Muscle (TV series), comedy set inside a fictional gym in New York City
- Muscle (film), a 2020 British thriller
- Muscle (musical), a 2001 musical
- "Muscles", an episode of the animated TV series Aqua TV Show Show
- Muscles (musician), Australian electronica musician Chris Copulos
- Les Musclés, a 1990s French band
- Muscles (album) (2007), by hip-hop musician Mele Mel
- "Muscles" (song), by Diana Ross
- M.U.S.C.L.E., small pink action figures originally known as Kinkeshi in Japan
- M.U.S.C.L.E. (video game), NES wrestling game based on the manga and anime Kinnikuman
- Mr. Muscles, a superhero in two 1956 comic book issues
- Mister Muscle, a member of the DC Comics Hero Hotline team
- Masked Muscle, an opponent in the Super NES video game Super Punch-Out!!

== People ==
- "Muscles", nickname of Venkatapathy Raju (born 1969), Indian former cricketer
- "Muscles", nickname of Ken Rosewall (born 1934), Australian retired tennis player
- Leo "Muscle" Shoals (1916-1999), American minor league baseball player
- Max Muscle (1963-2019), former American professional wrestler

== Other uses ==
- ST Muscle a tugboat in service with the French Government from 1946 to 1951
- MUSCLE (alignment software), a multiple sequence alignment tool
- MUSCLE, non-Windows API to Common Access Cards

== See also ==
- Jean-Claude Van Damme (born 1960), Belgian actor and martial artist nicknamed "the Muscles from Brussels"
- Mussel, marine or freshwater species, members of several different families of clams or bivalve molluscs
- Musele (disambiguation)
