= Landgraves of Leuchtenberg =

Former noble family

Coat of Arms of the Landgraves of Leuchtenberg

The Landgraves of Leuchtenberg were a Bavarian ruling dynasty of the Middle Ages, originally based in Leuchtenberg and later in Pfreimd.

== History ==
Their area of influence extended far beyond the borders of their home in the Upper Palatinate: the Landgravate was the largest secular non-Wittelsbach realm in Bavaria in their time.

The original dynasty was first mentioned in 1146 in connection with a nobleman named Gebhard. Gebhard had three sons: Friedrich I (who died at age 9); Gebhard II whose descendants became the senior, Landgrave line; and Marquad, whose descendants formed the cadet branch. Marquad died in action accompanying his brother on a campaign in Italy.

Emperor Friedrich Barbarossa awarded Gebhard's second eldest son, Gebhard II, the title of Count in 1158. The title of Landgrave was awarded to his son Diepold. The last of the Landgrave line was Maximilian Adam, who died in 1646.
