= Johann Baptist von Anzer =

German bishop and missionary (1851–1903)

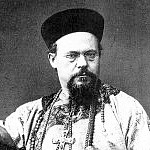
Johann Baptist von Anzer, S.V.D.

Johann Baptist Anzer (later von Anzer, Chinese: 安治泰; pinyin: Ān Zhìtài), S.V.D., (16 May 1851 – 24 November 1903) was a member of the Society of the Divine Word, popularly known as the Divine Word Missionaries, and Catholic bishop of the German Mission to China in Shandong Province.

== Life ==
Anzer was born in Weinrieth near Tännesberg, Oberpfalz, in the Kingdom of Bavaria, the son of a farmer and butcher. After an education in the Regensburg Lyceum he entered the newly founded missionary order of the Divine Word Missionaries in 1875, and was ordained a priest in the following year. In 1879 he was sent to the mission field of China together with Josef Freinademetz, who was declared a saint by the Catholic Church in 2006. Anzer was in charge of the mission school in Hong Kong until 1882, when he was appointed to lead the mission in the south of Shandong Province. In December 1885 the Congregation for the Propagation of the Faith, in charge of all mission territories, raised the status of the mission Anzer headed to that of an Apostolic Vicariate and in January 1886 he was appointed Vicar Apostolic of Southern Shantung, for which office he was consecrated in January 1886 by Cardinal Philipp Krementz of Cologne as the Titular Bishop of Thelepte.

In 1890 Anzer removed his mission from the diplomatic protection of France, which for some decades previously had exercised the right of diplomatic protection over all the missions in China, regardless of their nationality, and placed it under that of the German Reich.

Although based in the mission headquarters in Yangzhou, Anzer was a tireless traveller and writer in the cause of spreading knowledge of the mission, and indefatigable in the establishment of strong churches, schools and welfare institutions (children's homes, old people's homes and so on) throughout the mission's territory.

Anzer was also convinced of the need for an indigenous priesthood, and began the construction of a seminary for Chinese students. Freinademetz was entrusted with the training of the oldest students. The seminary was soon moved from Puoli to the larger town of Jining, the commercial centre of the province. the first two Chinese students were ordained in 1896. A retreat house was acquired, and an annual retreat for all missionaries was introduced.

On 1 November 1897 the Divine Word missionaries, Fathers Richard Henle and Franz Xaver Nies, were murdered by Chinese attackers in what is known as the "Juye Incident". Anzer happened to be on a visit to Europe at the time, and hurried to Berlin, where he persuaded Kaiser Wilhelm II to send two warships to the Jiaozhou Bay (Kiautschou) on the south-east coast of Shandong where the Germans exploited the murders as a pretext for the establishment of a German mandate. The centre of the mission then moved to Tsingtao (Qingdao).

In 1897 he was ennobled as von Anzer by the Prince Regent of Bavaria.

Anzer's effectiveness as a missionary in Shandong and the German colonisation of parts of the province threatened to increase social tensions there. It is unclear whether this was a significant factor in the outbreak of the Boxer Rebellion in 1900. Although the Rebellion was anti-Christian, it was not focussed on the areas within Anzer's own mission field.

Anzer died in 1903 while on a visit to Rome for consultations after complaints had been received from a number of his priests. He was buried in the Teutonic Cemetery within the grounds of the Vatican.
