= Samu Chiefdom =

Samu
- Chiefdom
- Interactive map of Samu
- Country: Sierra Leone
- Province: North West Province
- District: Kambia District
- Capital: Samu

Population (2004)
  - Total: 56,857
- Time zone: UTC+0 (GMT)

Samu is a chiefdom in Kambia District of Sierra Leone with a population of 56,857. Its principal town is Kychum.
