= Tännesberg (Verwaltungsgemeinschaft) =

- Verwaltungsgemeinschaft
- Location of Tännesberg within Neustadt an der Waldnaab district
- Interactive map of Tännesberg
- Location within Germany Location within Bavaria
- Coordinates: 49°32′N 12°20′E
- Country: Germany
- State: Bavaria
- Admin. region: Upper Palatinate
- District: Neustadt an der Waldnaab
- Seat: Tännesberg
- Subdivisions: 2 municipalities

Area
  - Total: 78.92 km^{2} (30.47 sq mi)

Population (2025-12-31)
  - Total: 2,659
  - Density: 33.69/km^{2} (87.26/sq mi)
- Time zone: UTC+01:00 (CET)
  - Summer (DST): UTC+02:00 (CEST)
- Website: www.taennesberg.de

Tännesberg is a Verwaltungsgemeinschaft (municipal association) in the district of Neustadt an der Waldnaab in Bavaria, Germany. Its seat is in Tännesberg.

It consists of the following municipalities:

1. Leuchtenberg
2. Tännesberg
