= Victor Mosele =

American missionary

Victor Mosele was a Catholic Xaverian missionary priest. He spent 30 years in Sierra Leone building schools, clinics, and promoting his religion. At one point, he was in charge of 33 different schools, including 6,000 children.

According to a Xaverian Missionary Newsletter of 1999, Mosele was captured by the rebel army in Kambia near Guinea on February 11, 1999. He had turned back in an effort to acquire medicine for the wounded when he was met by the RUF rebels and taken to Makeni.

On September 6 he was captured again along with Fr. Franco Manganello at Pamelap near the border of Guinea. In one of Mosele's accounts of his experiences in Sierra Leone, he recalls that the people who captured him had been part of the schools he established. On October 4, 2000 Pope John Paul II made an appeal at his general audience to the rebel army for peace and for the release of Victor Mosele and Franco Manganello.

== From 2009 ==
Mosele was at the campus ministry center, in Madison, WI, and was then stationed at Illinois State University's St. Robert Bellarmine Catholic Center during the 2009–10 school year. He wrote a book about his experiences titled Running For My Life, which was published in Fall 2006. He died on August 23, 2012, and was buried on August 28, 2012.
