= Menden =

- Town
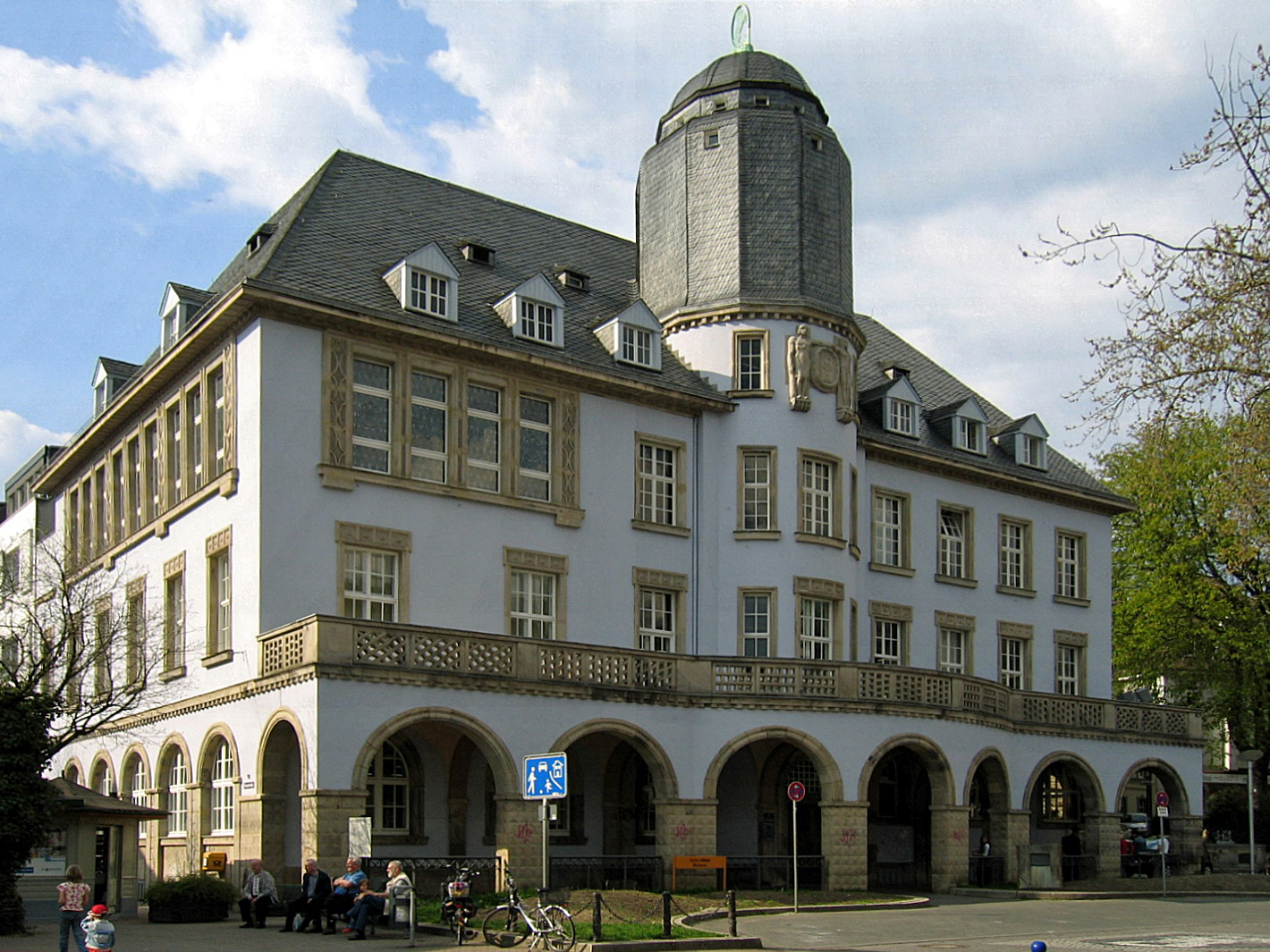
- Old city hall in Menden

- Coat of arms

- Location of Menden within Märkischer Kreis district
- Interactive map of Menden
- Location within Germany Location within North Rhine-Westphalia
- Coordinates: 51°26′N 07°48′E
- Country: Germany
- State: North Rhine-Westphalia
- Admin. region: Arnsberg
- District: Märkischer Kreis

Government
  - Mayor (2025–30): Manuela Schmidt (CDU)

Area
  - Total: 86.1 km^{2} (33.2 sq mi)
- Elevation: 115–380 m (377–1,247 ft)

Population (2025-12-31)
  - Total: 52,121
  - Density: 605/km^{2} (1,570/sq mi)
- Time zone: UTC+01:00 (CET)
  - Summer (DST): UTC+02:00 (CEST)
- Postal codes: 58706, 58708, 58710
- Dialling codes: 02373; 02378 (Halingen); 02379 (Asbeck)
- Vehicle registration: MK
- Website: www.menden.de

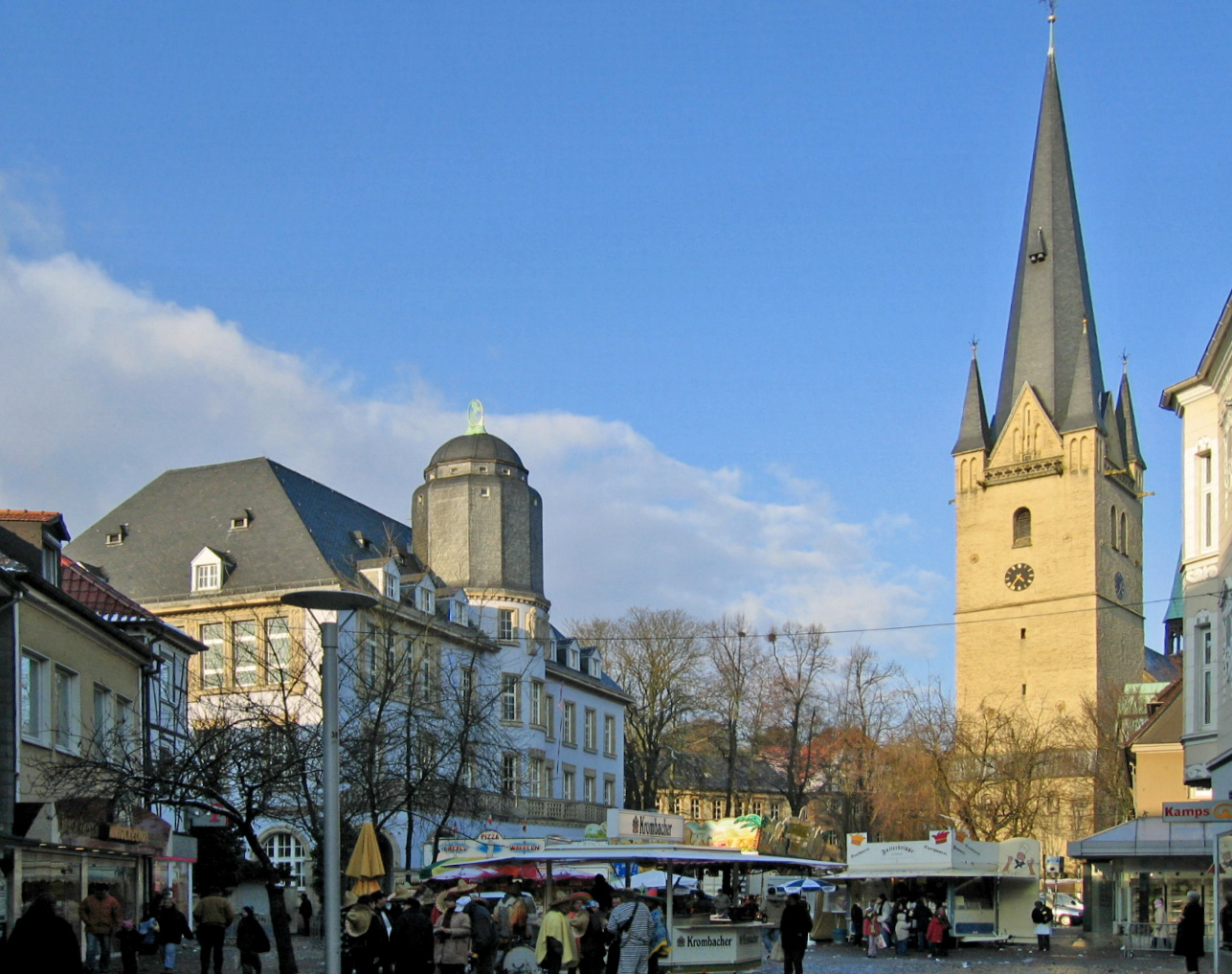

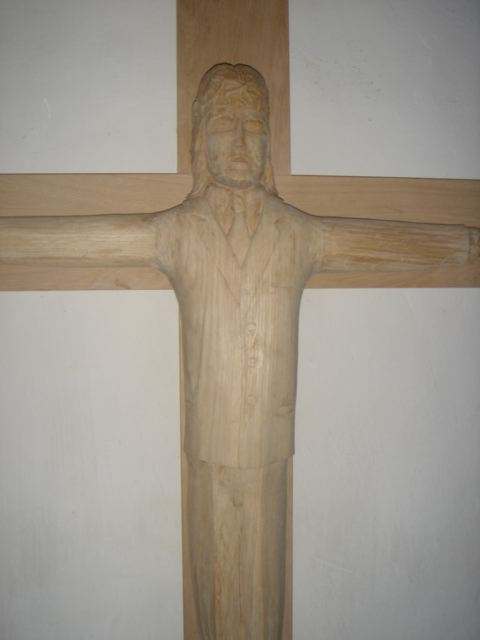
A sculpture from Mile Prerad (2008)

Menden (German pronunciation: [ˈmɛndn̩], official name: Menden (Sauerland); Westphalian: Mennen) is a city in the district Märkischer Kreis, in North Rhine-Westphalia, Germany. It is located at the north end of the Sauerland near the Ruhr river.

== History ==
Menden's first churches were built in the 9th century. From 1180 on the area around Menden was part of the Cologne region, however, as it was on the border with the County of Mark, it was often fought over. In 1276, it received city rights. Industrialization started early: in 1695 needle production was the first industry, later followed by limestone products such as cement. In 1816 Menden was included within Prussia, after being part of Hesse for 13 years. In 1975 the city was merged with several previously independent municipalities, thus it grew in area as well as population.

== Population ==
Historical population

Year	Pop.	±% p.a.
1965	50,062	—
1970	52,114	+0.81%
1975	53,244	+0.43%
1980	53,326	+0.03%
1985	52,072	−0.47%
1990	56,527	+1.66%
1995	58,424	+0.66%

Year	Pop.	±% p.a.
2000	59,239	+0.28%
2005	57,984	−0.43%
2010	55,496	−0.87%
2015	53,485	−0.74%
2020	52,452	−0.39%
2025	52,121	−0.13%

Source: Landesdatabank Nordrhein-Westfalen

== Points of interest ==
The Hönnetal, a narrow valley with some beautiful cliffs carved into the limestone bedrock by the river Hönne.

== Education ==
=== Primary education ===
In Menden (Sauerland), there are eleven elementary schools.

=== Secondary schools ===
Besides four hauptschulen, two realschulen, there are three grammar schools:

- Heilig-Geist-Gymnasium, only for boys until 1977; since 2015 combined with the Walramgymnasium and now named Städtisches Gymnasium an der Hönne
- Walburgisgymnasium, only for girls until 1974
- Walramgymnasium; since 2015 combined with the Heilig-Geist-Gymnasium and now named Städtisches Gymnasium an der Hönne

== Culture ==
The theatre managed by the city government, is the Theater am Ziegelbrand (TAZ).

=== Music ===
Menden à la carte is a popular festival. It is organized by the Initiativkreis Mendener Wirtschaft.

=== Theatre ===
In Menden there are three theatres; the Theater am Ziegelbrand in an old factory building with places for 49 spectators. Another theatre is located under the indoor swimming pool with places for 99 people. It is called Zimmertheater Scaramouche and corporate appearances and a traditional Christmas stage play can be seen there. For the young visitors there is a kids club. The third theatre is in Halingen. It is called the Halinger Dorftheater.

=== Museum ===
Founded in 1912, the Museum of Menden specialized on the living circumstances of the citizens of Menden in medieval age. It informs about and reconstructs the equipment from farmers' and patricians' houses. It also presents bones of human beings from prehistoric times and the complete skeleton of a cave bear.

=== Buildings ===
- The ruin of Burg Rodenberg, an old caste in the forest near the indoor swimming pool.
- The St.-Vincenz-Kirche, founded in 1345, is the biggest church in Menden and is near the old city hall.
- Parts of the old city defense such as 3 towers and a little part of the city wall still exist and may be seen.

=== Sport ===
In Menden there are many sport clubs. It is the home of the Sauerland Cup, which is a competition for handball clubs from all around the world. Even clubs from Japan or Switzerland took part in 2005. It takes place in spring and nearly every sports hall available is used. Menden is also the host of an international soccer competition in which every U-10 club can take part. The Huckenohlstadion is a multi-purpose stadium. Menden also has clubs for basketball, tennis, swimming, dancing, volleyball, boxing and contests, matches and demonstrations can be attended nearly every weekend.

=== Regular events ===
The first event in a year is the carnival, with a parade of clubs and local dance groups.

The second event is the Lendringser Frühling. Organized by the Lendringser Werbegemeinschaft it is an event combined with the possibility of Sunday shopping. The public can visit stalls and presentations of different groups such as a bike performance or typical food from different communities like the Greek one.

The Good Friday procession has taken place since the 17th century. The route starts near the St Vincenz Church and goes over 14 stations to the St Antonius Chapel and it begins hourly. The route is 2.5 kilometres (1 1/2 miles) long, and especially for the youth there is a procession with music which is well attended by young people.

In the time around Pentecost, Menden organizes a kirmes with amusement rides, food stands and a big firework display on Tuesday at the end of the kirmes. This event is a big magnet for over 300,000 people living around Menden. This event takes place during four days, from the Saturday before Pentecost until the Tuesday after.

The series Mendener Sommer is a collection of several events of different national and international music artists. The events which are free and organized by the culture office are mainly in July and August and take place outside in the centre of the city.

Menden à la carte is an event which takes place in the summer from Friday to Sunday and is marked culturally and culinarily.

The Mendener Herbst is an event of the Menden advertising organization and takes place every year on the 3rd weekend of October. It is a kind of a junk market for arts and crafts from the region.

== Twin towns – sister cities ==
Menden is twinned with:

- Aire-sur-la-Lys, France (1965)
- Ardres, France (1974/75)
- Braine-l'Alleud, Belgium (1978)
- Flintshire, Wales, United Kingdom (1980)
- Lestrem, France (1971)
- Locon, France (1964)
- Marœuil, France (1984)
- Plungė, Lithuania (1992/93)
- Eisenberg, Germany

=== Friendly cities ===
Menden also has friendly relations with:

- Chalcis, Greece (2000)

== Notable people ==
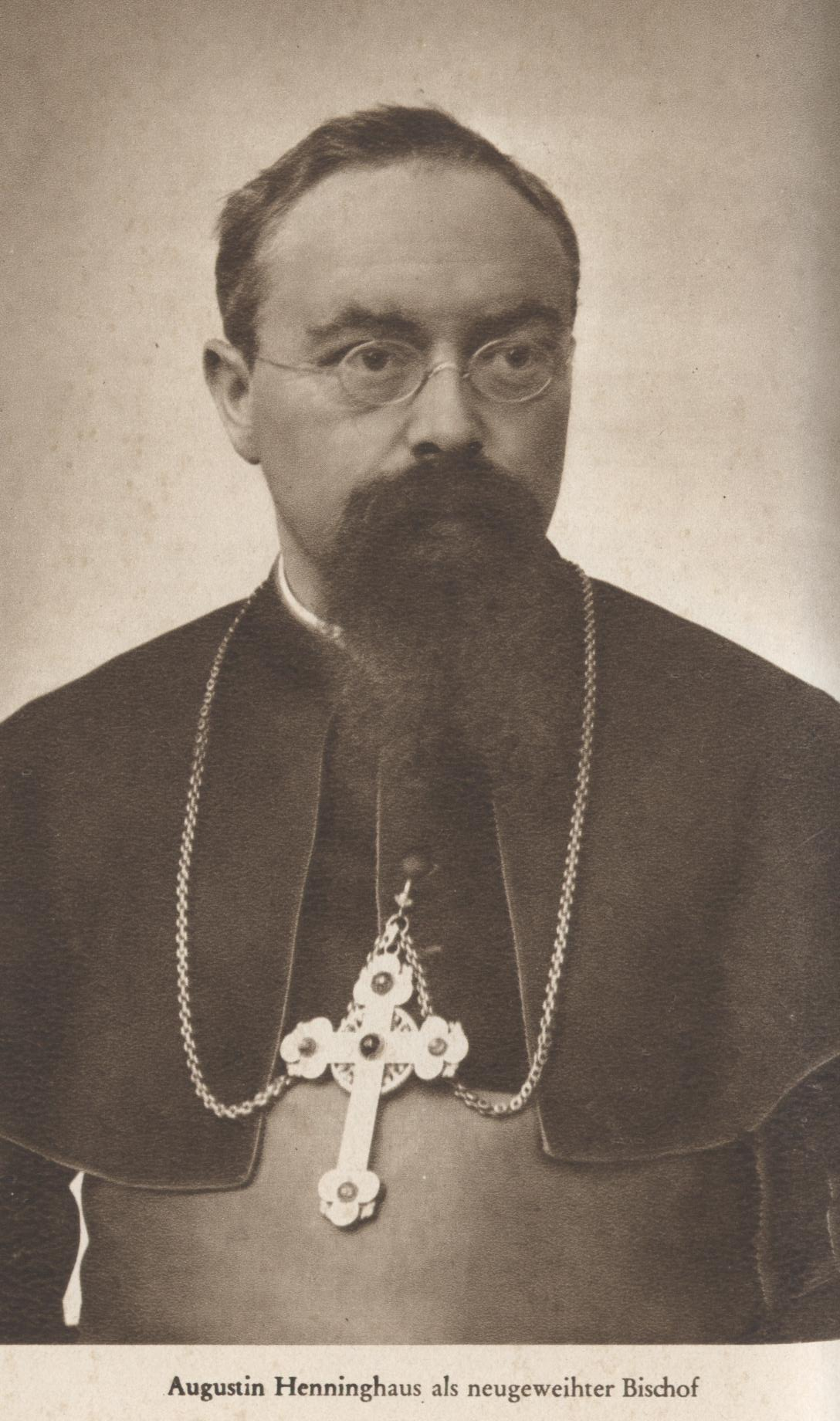
Bishop Augustin Hennighaus 1904

- Augustin Henninghaus (1862–1939), missionary bishop in China at the time of the German Empire
- Erich Bärenfänger (1915–1945), Major General
- Wolfram Kuschke (born 1950), former president of the regional government (Bezirksregierung Arnsberg) and member of the state parliament, social democrat
- Silvia Hollmann (born 1955), athlete
- Dieter Lemke (born 1956), footballer
- Dendemann (born 1974), rapper
