= Jesus Is Lord Ministries =

Evangelist church in Freetown, Sierra Leone

Jesus is Lord Ministries

Religion
- Affiliation: Christianity
- Leadership: Sister Dora Dumbuya, senior pastor

Location
- Location: Freetown, Sierra Leone

Architecture
- Type: Church
- Completed: 1989

Website
- http://www.jesusislordministries-sl.org/

Jesus is Lord Ministries is a large Evangelist church located in the neighbourhood of Tower Hill in central Freetown, the capital of Sierra Leone. The church is in close proximity to the Sierra Leone House of Parliament.

The church was founded by the evangelist Christian preacher Sister Dora Dumbuya in 1989, who is still the senior pastor of the church. The church has thousands of followers, and the church service is broadcast by several radio stations across Sierra Leone.
