= Tonko Limba Chiefdom =

Tonko Limba
- Chiefdom
- Interactive map of Tonko Limba
- Country: Sierra Leone
- Province: North West Province
- District: Kambia District
- Capital: Madina

Population (2004)
  - Total: 39,106
- Time zone: UTC+0 (GMT)

Tonko Limba is a chiefdom in Kambia District of Sierra Leone with a population of 39,106. Its principal town is Madina.
