= Leuchtenberg =

- Municipality
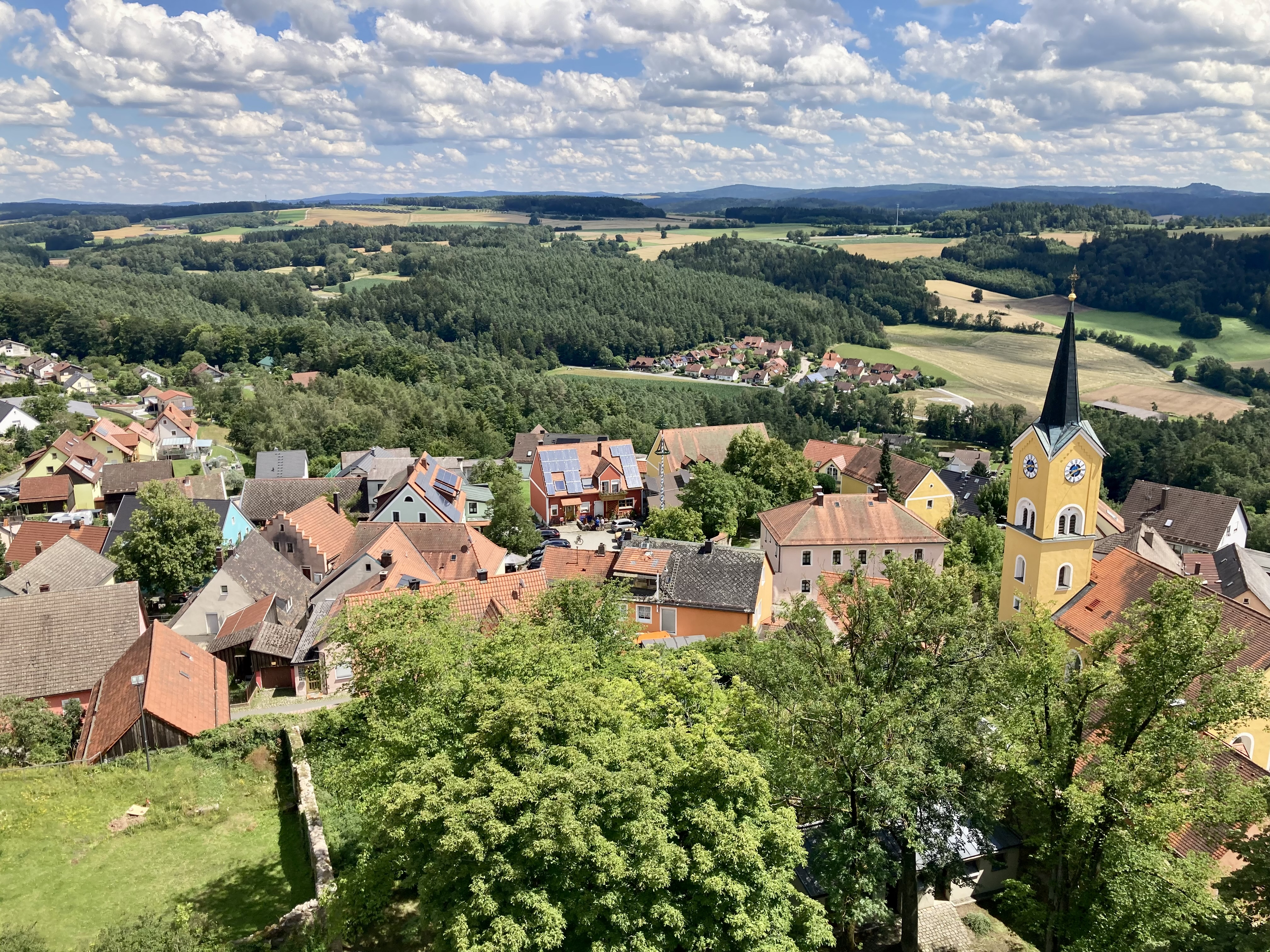
- View of the town from the hilltop fortress. Leuchtenberg, Germany

- Coat of arms

- Location of Leuchtenberg within Neustadt a.d.Waldnaab district
- Interactive map of Leuchtenberg
- Location within Germany Location within Bavaria
- Coordinates: 49°36′N 12°15′E
- Country: Germany
- State: Bavaria
- Admin. region: Oberpfalz
- District: Neustadt a.d.Waldnaab
- Municipal assoc.: Tännesberg
- Subdivisions: 18 Ortsteile

Government
  - Mayor (2020–26): Anton Kappl (CSU)

Area
  - Total: 32.36 km^{2} (12.49 sq mi)
- Elevation: 572 m (1,877 ft)

Population (2025-12-31)
  - Total: 1,164
  - Density: 35.97/km^{2} (93.16/sq mi)
- Time zone: UTC+01:00 (CET)
  - Summer (DST): UTC+02:00 (CEST)
- Postal codes: 92705
- Dialling codes: 09659
- Vehicle registration: NEW
- Website: www.leuchtenberg.de

Leuchtenberg (German pronunciation: [ˈlɔʏçtn̩ˌbɛʁk]) is a municipality in the district of Neustadt an der Waldnaab in Bavaria, Germany, essentially a suburb of nearby Weiden in der Oberpfalz, and a larger historical region in the Holy Roman Empire governed by the Landgraves of Leuchtenberg.

== Royal (noble) and notable (not noble) Leuchtenbergers ==
- Landgraves of Leuchtenberg
- Thomas Mohr, Wisconsin farmer and local official

== See also ==
- Duke of Leuchtenberg
