= Thomas Zhao Fengwu =

Bishop of Yanzhou (born 1920)

- Bishop of Yanzhou
- Native name: 赵凤梧
- Church: Cathedral of the Holy Spirit in Yanzhou
- Province: Shandong
- Diocese: Roman Catholic Diocese of Yanzhou
- Installed: 22 April 1994
- Term ended: 15 August 2005
- Predecessor: Shi Linge
- Successor: Lǚ Peisen

Orders
- Ordination: 1945
- Consecration: May 18, 1993

Personal details
- Born: June 14, 1920 Jining, Shandong, China
- Died: August 15, 2005 (aged 85) Tengzhou, Shandong, China
- Denomination: Roman Catholic

Chinese name
- Traditional Chinese: 趙鳳梧
- Simplified Chinese: 赵凤梧
Transcriptions
Standard Mandarin
- Hanyu Pinyin: Zhào Fèngwú

Thomas Zhao Fengwu (Chinese: 赵凤梧; June 14, 1920 - August 15, 2005) was a Chinese Catholic prelate, verbist, bishop of Yanzhou, prisoner for faith. He was recognized as a legal bishop by both the Holy See and the government of the People's Republic of China. Zhao was proficient in German.

== Biography ==
Zhao was born in Jining, Shandong, on June 14, 1920, to a Catholic family. In 1939 he joined the Higher Seminary in Yanzhou (now Yanzhou District). On April 20, 1945, he was ordained a presbyterate.

Before his arrest, he was the parish priest of the cathedral parish in Yanzhou and the director of the hospital run by the diocese. In 1958 he was arrested by the Communist government and sentenced to a forced labor camp, where he worked as an agricultural laborer. He regained his freedom in 1980. After his release, he returned to the pastoral ministry in the diocese of Yanzhou and joined the Congregation of the Word of God. Then he was a lecturer at the Holy Spirit Seminary in Jinan.

In December 1992, he was elected administrator of the diocese of Yanzhou, and then its bishop. On May 18, 1993, in Jinan, he received the episcopal consecration from the hands of the anti-Bishop of Jinan and the chairman of the Catholic Patriotic Association Joseph Zhong Huaide. Co-Consecrators were the Apostolic prefect of Yiduxian Joseph Sun Zhibin and the coadjutor of the anti-bishop Zhoucun Joseph Ma Xuesheng. All three consecrators were ordained without the consent of the Pope and thus excommunicated.

Zhao was known for the fact that he spent most of his year riding his diocese by motorcycle, visiting diocese. During one such trip in 2005, he was found on a road near Tengzhou in severe condition and soon died. In the funeral mass, which took place on August 19, 2005, 600 people participated.

Catholic Church titles
Previous: Shi Linge (石麟阁)	Bishop of Yanzhou; 1994-2005	Next: Lǚ Peisen (吕培森)
