= Ephrem Giesen =

Ephrem Giesen (1868–1919; Chinese name: 申永福 Shen Yongfu) was a missionary priest of the Dutch Franciscan order of the Roman Catholic church who served in northern Shandong province and as a member of the Dutch Fransciscan mission of south [Shanxi], in the late Qing and early republican China. He served as vicar apostolic of North Shandong from 1902 until his death in 1919 and was also made titular Bishop of Paltus in 1902.

== Early life and missionary work in China ==
Giesen was born in Amsterdam 16 October 1868. He entered the Franciscan order at Maastricht in 1866, and was ordained in 1893. His first posting in China was to the South Shanxi mission in 1894, serving there through the period of the Boxer Rebellion until his appointment as vicar apostolic of North Shandong in 1902, moving to Jinan and working with Italian missionaries based in the region.

By the time of his appointment as titular Bishop of Paltus in 1902, he was said to preside in Jinan over 11 Franciscan friars, 18 native Chinese priests, 18,000 Catholics, 13,900 catechumens, and 134 churches or chapels.

While in China, Giesen sought financial support from the German government and to place the North Shandong mission under German protection, which would come to pass eventually in 1914. The work of Giesen and other Dutch missionaries, helped keep the German missions survive in Shandong during and in the aftermath of World War I.

== Boxer Rebellion ==
In the spring of 1900, as the Boxer Rebellion was unfolding across northern China, Ephrem Giesen was located at Xinzhuang, south of Machang, where a Catholic fortified stronghold had been established. Giesen was wounded on two occasions in violent clashes with Boxers in the summer of that year, at the peak of the crisis. Local Catholics managed to hold off Boxers in many cases, and there were no Dutch friars killed in the attacks in the region during the summer of 1900.
