= Dora Dumbuya =

Christian evangelist preacher from Sierra Leonean

Mammy Dumbuya

Senior pastor of Jesus is Lord Ministries Church
- Incumbent
- Assumed office 1989

Personal details
- Born: Sierra Leone
- Spouse: Colonel Kahota M.S. Dumbuya (until his execution in 1992)
- Profession: Pastor, Christian Evangelist Preacher

Sister Dora Dumbuya commonly known as Mammy Dumbuya is a Sierra Leonean Christian evangelist preacher and the owner and senior pastor of Jesus is Lord Ministries Church, a large evangelist Christian church located in the capital of Freetown, Sierra Leone.

Mammy Dumbuya is known in Sierra Leone and her church service and preaching have thousands of followers.

She is the widow of former Sierra Leonean senior military officer Colonel K.M.S. Dumbuya, who was executed in December 1992 under the NPRC military junta government.

In April 2007, Sierra Leone president Ahmad Tejan Kabbah honoured Dumbuya with one of Sierra Leone's highest awards, during a military parade at State House in Freetown in celebration of Sierra Leone's 46th anniversary of independence.
