= Joseph Marie Garavel =

French Roman Catholic missionary (1824–1885)

Joseph Marie Garavel (c. 1824 – 9 October 1885) was a French Roman Catholic missionary in New Zealand. He was born in Chambéry, France.

He joined a seminary in Paris, and was ordained in Auckland in 1849. In 1864 he moved to St Mary's Cathedral, Sydney; he later served in Newtown, Pyrmont and Petersham.
