= Pamelap =

- Sub-prefecture and town
- Location in Guinea
- Coordinates: 9°26′N 13°05′W
- Country: Guinea
- Region: Kindia Region
- Prefecture: Forécariah Prefecture
- Elevation: 256 ft (78 m)

Population (2008 est.)
  - Total: 20,000

Pamelap is a town in Forécariah Prefecture, Kindia Region in the Republic of Guinea. Pamelap shares an international border with the town of Gbalamuya located in the Republic of Sierra Leone. Pamelap has a population about 20,000.

Almost the entire population of Pamelap are a members of the Susu ethnic group. The Susu language is widely spoken in Pamelap, and is the main language of communication in the town. The population of Pamelap is virtually all Muslim, and it is known for its conservative Muslim population.
