= Augustin Henninghaus =

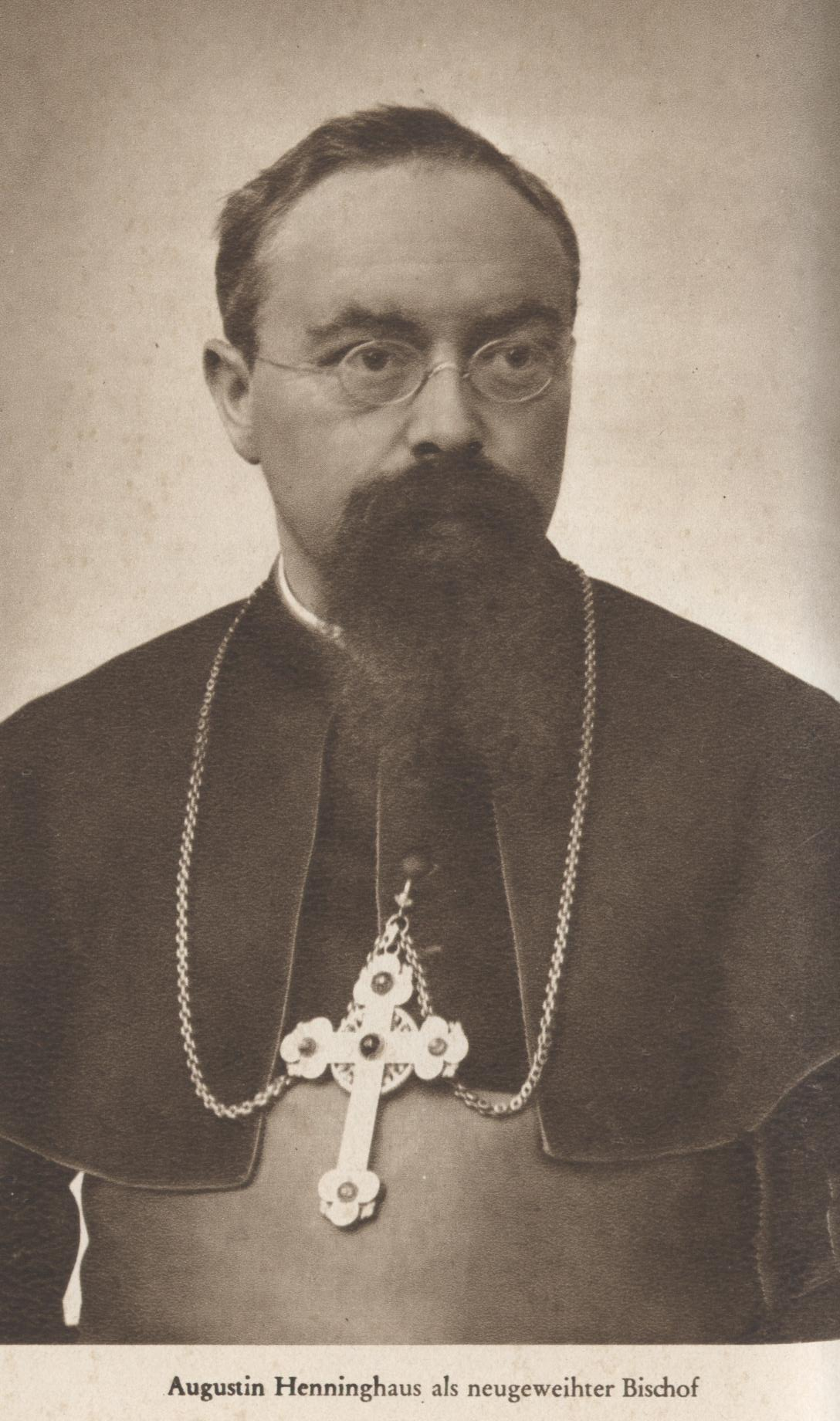
Bishop Augustin Henninghaus: official photograph from the time of his consecration on 30 October 1904

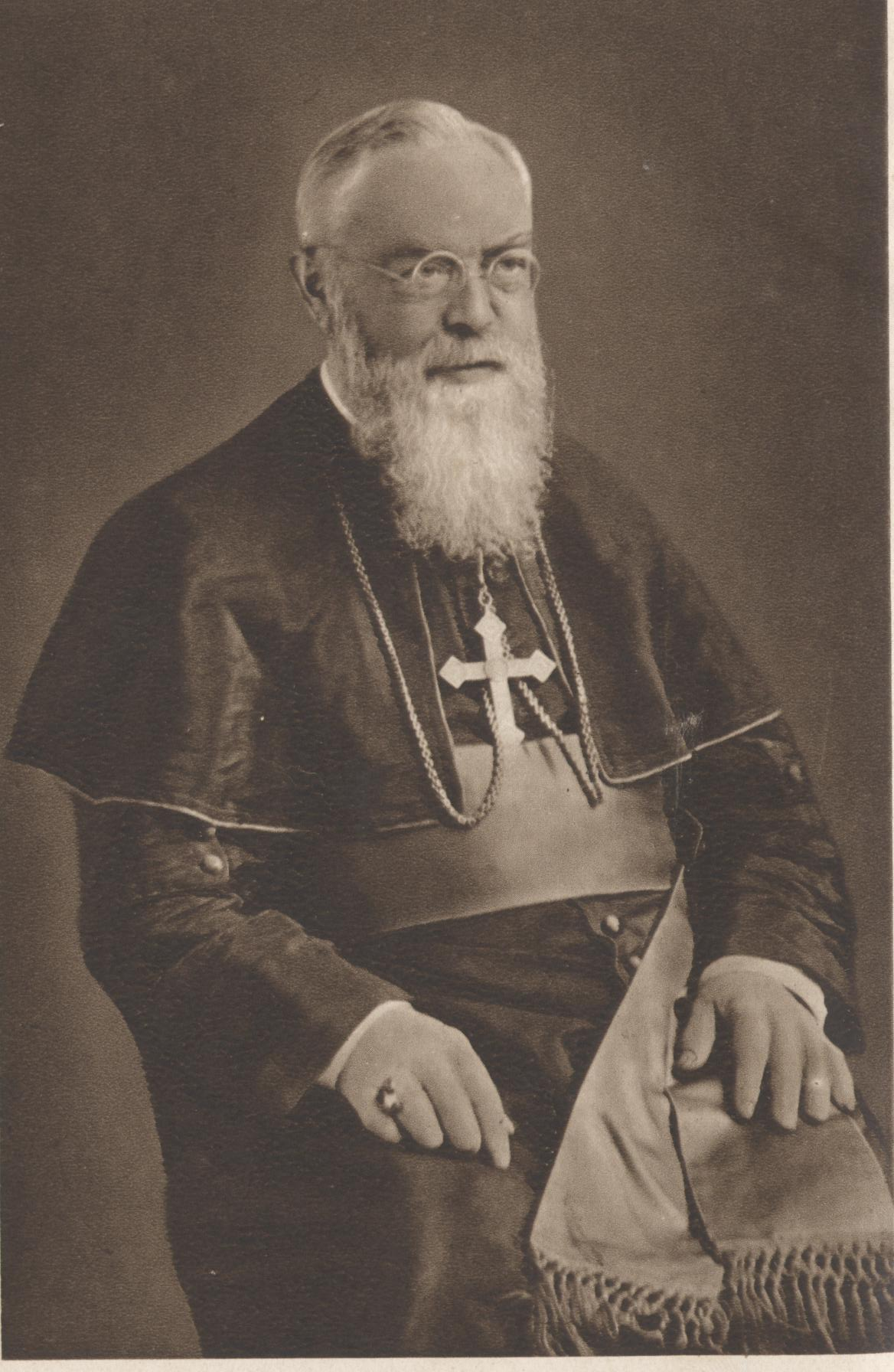
The bishop aged 60

Augustin Henninghaus SVD (11 September 1862, Menden (Sauerland), Province of Westphalia – 20 July 1939) was a German Roman Catholic missionary and bishop in China.

== Life ==
Henninghaus, whose baptismal name was August, was born in Menden in the present North Rhine-Westphalia. After attendance at the local secondary school and two further years of private education he entered the Society of the Divine Word, or Steyler Missionaries, on 11 October 1879. He was ordained to the priesthood on 30 May 1885.

In 1886, he was sent as a missionary to China. In 1904 Pope Pius X made him Vicar Apostolic of Southern Shantung (renamed the Vicariate Apostolic of Yenchowfu on 3 December 1924) and titular bishop of Hypaepa. In 1910 he founded the women's order of the Oblates of the Holy Family, who still operate in Taiwan and China, and as of 2010 number approximately 200 sisters.

In 1935 the bishop retired, but continued to live in China until his death in Yanzhou on 20 July 1939.

== Sources ==
- Hermann Fischer SVD, 1940: "Augustin Henninghaus - 53 Jahre Missionar und Missionsbischof". Steyler Missionsbuchhandlung Kaldenkirchen (Rheinland/Germany)
- Richard Hartwich SVD: Steyler Missionare in China I. Missionarische Erschliessung Südshantungs 1879-1903. Beiträge zu einer Geschichte. (Studia Instituti Missiologici SVD 32) Steyler Verlag, St. Augustin 1983, ISBN 3-87787-166-6.
- Richard Hartwich: Steyler Missionare in China II. Bischof A. Henninghaus ruft Steyler Schwestern 1904-1910. (Studia Instituti Missiologici SVD 36). Steyler Verlag, Nettetal 1985, ISBN 3-87787-189-5.
- Richard Hartwich: Steyler Missionare in China III. Republik China und erster Weltkrieg 1911-1919. (Studia Instituti Missiologici SVD 40). Steyler Verlag, Nettetal 1987, ISBN 3-8050-0180-0.
- R. Hartwich: Steyler Missionare in China IV. Geistlicher Führer seiner Chinamissionare Rev.mus P. Wilhelm Gier SVD 1922. (Studia Instituti Missiologici SVD 42). Steyler Verlag, Nettetal 1988, ISBN 3-8050-0202-5.
- R. Hartwich: Steyler Missionare in China V. Aus Kriegsruinen zu neuen Grenzen 1920-1923. (Studia Instituti Missiologici SVD 48). Steyler Verlag, Nettetal 1989, ISBN 3-8050-0242-4.
- R. Hartwich: Steyler Missionare in China VI. Auf den Wogen des Chinesischen Bürgerkrieges 1924-1926. (Studia Instituti Missiologici SVD 53). Steyler Verlag, Nettetal 1987, ISBN 3-8050-0288-2.
- Paul B. Steffen, Witness and Holiness, the Heart of the Life of Saint Joseph Freinademetz of Shandong, in: Studia Missionalia 61 (Roma 2012) 257–392, Gregorian & Biblical Press, Roma 2012, ISBN 978-88-7839-225-0
