= Tännesberg =

- Municipality
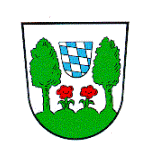
- Coat of arms

- Location of Tännesberg within Neustadt a.d.Waldnaab district
- Interactive map of Tännesberg
- Location within Germany Location within Bavaria
- Coordinates: 49°32′N 12°20′E
- Country: Germany
- State: Bavaria
- Admin. region: Oberpfalz
- District: Neustadt a.d.Waldnaab
- Municipal assoc.: Tännesberg

Government
  - Mayor (2020–26): Ludwig Gürtler (FW)

Area
  - Total: 46.56 km^{2} (17.98 sq mi)
- Elevation: 585 m (1,919 ft)

Population (2025-12-31)
  - Total: 1,495
  - Density: 32.11/km^{2} (83.16/sq mi)
- Time zone: UTC+01:00 (CET)
  - Summer (DST): UTC+02:00 (CEST)
- Postal codes: 92723
- Dialling codes: 09655
- Vehicle registration: NEW
- Website: www.taennesberg.de

Tännesberg (German pronunciation: [ˈtɛnəsbɛʁk]) is a municipality in the district of Neustadt an der Waldnaab in Bavaria, Germany.

== Population development including incorporations ==
Year	1840	1871	1900	1925	1939	1950	1961	1970	1987	1995	2010	2015
Inhabitants	1777	1807	1692	1659	1676	1939	1586	1695	1579	1721	1506	1531

== Mayors ==
- 2002-2008: Matthias Grundler
- 2008–2020: Max Völkl (independent)
- since 2020: Ludwig Gürtler (independent)

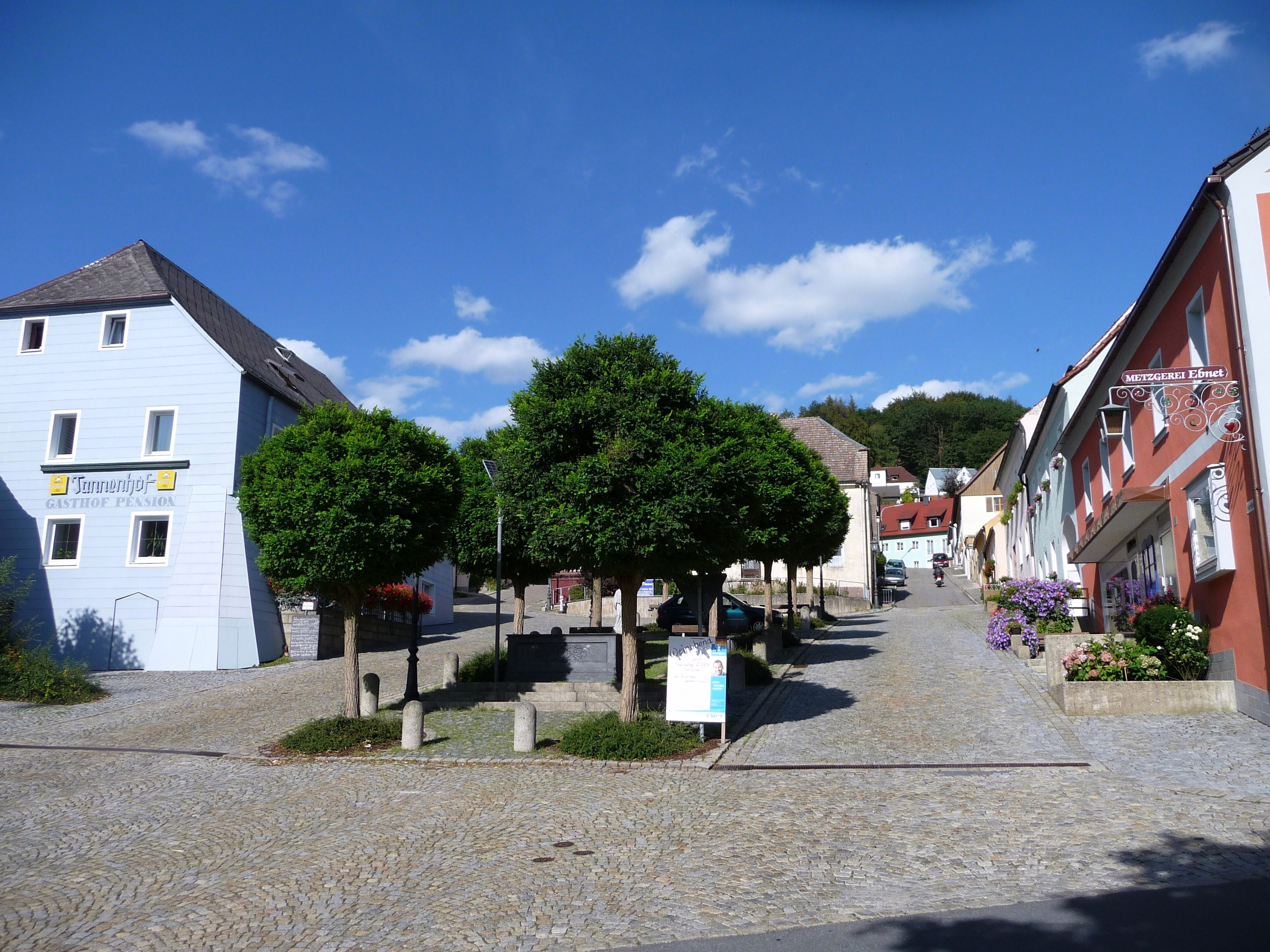
Market place Tännesberg
