= Ivan Vreman =

Croatian astronomer (1583–1620)

The Reverend Ivan Vreman (Ivan Ureman) SJ
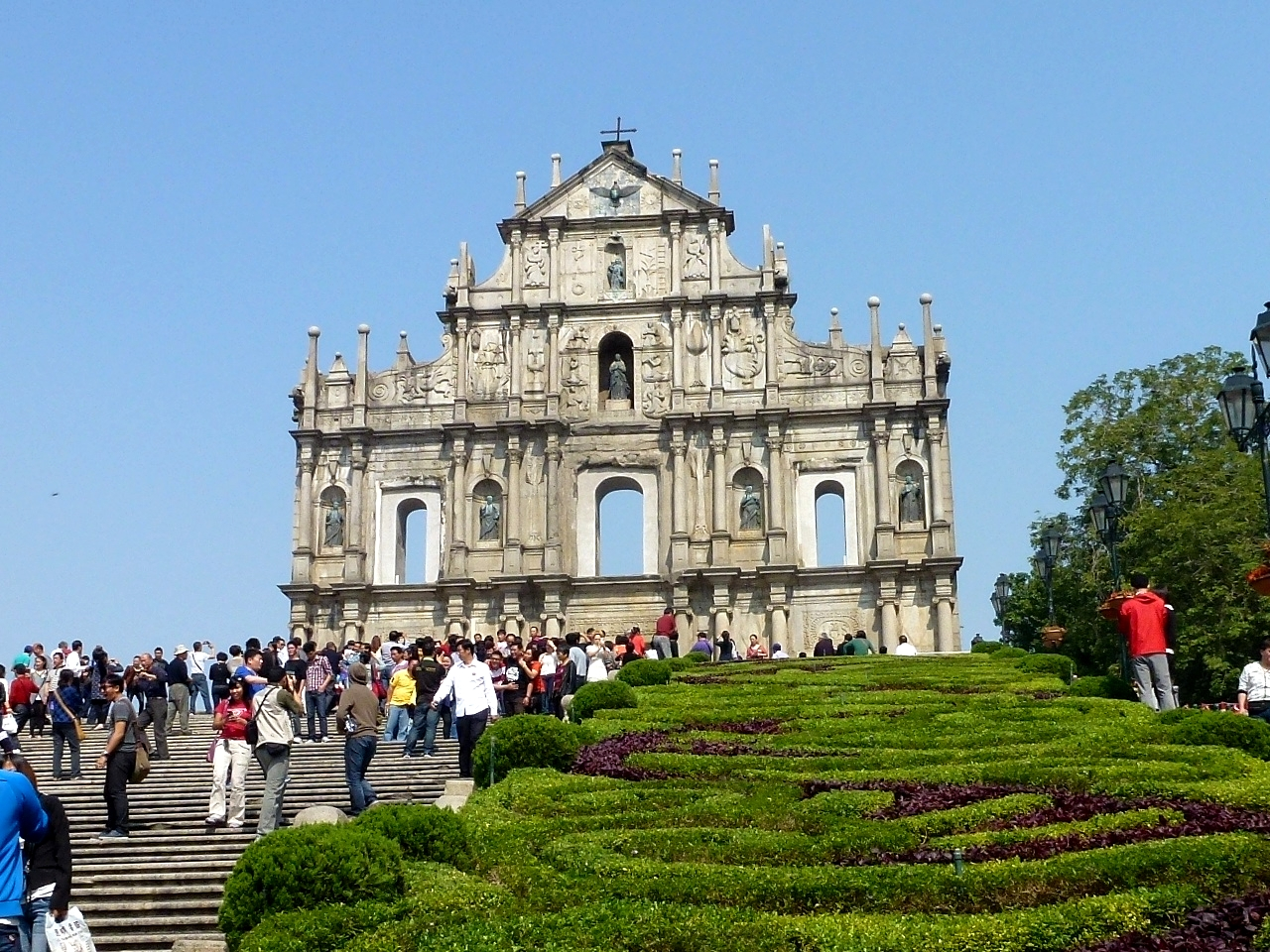
- Ruins of Saint Paul's Cathedral in Macau, where Vreman worked from 1616 to 1619
- Born: Ivan Vreman; 6 June 1583; Split, Croatia
- Died: 22 April 1620 (aged 36); Nanchang, China
- Citizenship: Croatia under Venetian rule
- Education: Collegium Romanum, Rome
- Known for: lunar eclipse research, magnetic declinations, determining geographical coordinates
- Scientific career
- Fields: Theology, physics, astronomy, mathematics
- Workplaces: Colegio de los Jesuitas in Oropesa, Spain, St. Paul's College, Macau

Ivan Vreman (in some sources Ivan Ureman) SJ (6 June 1583 – 22 April 1620) was a Croatian astronomer, physicist, mathematician, missionary, translator and Jesuit priest. His work in the field of astronomy and mathematics means complementing and improving the work of those scientists from the Early modern era who used a mathematical approach to search for new insights and knowledge about understanding reality. It also presents his interests and contributions in the broader context of research and scientific conditions and opportunities at the very beginning of the 17th century. As a Catholic missionary, he worked during the first Jesuit missions in the Far East, so his activities can also be viewed from the perspective of the exchange of knowledge and the entire activities of the early intermediaries between Europe and countries like China, Japan and India.

== Biography ==
=== Early years ===
Vreman was born on 6 June 1583 in Split, Croatia, at that time under Venetian rule. There is very little information about his early life, but he most likely attended one of the schools in Split, as that town, like other major towns on the Croatian coast, had organized education for the younger generation. Thus, Vreman received a quality initial education that helped him to be sent to Rome in 1600 to the novitiate of the Society of Jesus. In 1602 he began his studies at the Collegium Romanum. He studied natural philosophy, mathematics and astronomy. In 1607 he completed his studies in philosophy and became involved in scientific work, beginning to conduct astronomical researches. He was especially interested in studying of lunar eclipse, which occupied him all the time during his life. His astronomical observations are preserved in letters he exchanged with his professors and other prominent scholars. From 1607 to 1609 he studied theology.

Since the telescope was not yet available, Vreman made his observations without it, but therefore carried out them by devising special observational and methodical procedures. He made a detailed description of the lunar eclipse, as evidenced, for instance, by a letter he sent on 31 January 1609 to the Italian astronomer, cartographer and mathematician Magini, in which he enclosed a description of his observations.

In 1609 he left Rome for Portugal and Spain, intending to go to the Far East, but had to wait for the departure of a ship that had been preparing for that long voyage. While waiting, he worked until 1615 as a professor of mathematics in Lisbon and at the Colegio de los Jesuitas in the city of Oropesa in Spain. The only known work that has been preserved from that period is his mathematical manuscript Geometriae speculatiuae compendium (Handbook of Speculative Geometry). From this manuscript, which he probably wrote for teaching purposes, it can be possible to see his mathematical interests and attitudes.

=== Missionary work ===
In 1615 he set out on a voyage to Jesuit mission in Goa, India, where he stayed for nine months. After that, he continued his voyage to another Jesuit mission, which was situated in the Portuguese colony of Macau. That colony was an important location on the southern borders of China, because it was open to travellers, unlike China itself, where access was very difficult. Vreman stayed in Macau from 1616 for the next couple of years doing scientific work. There he also taught mathematics, studied Chinese astronomy and translated works of missionaries residing in Japan.

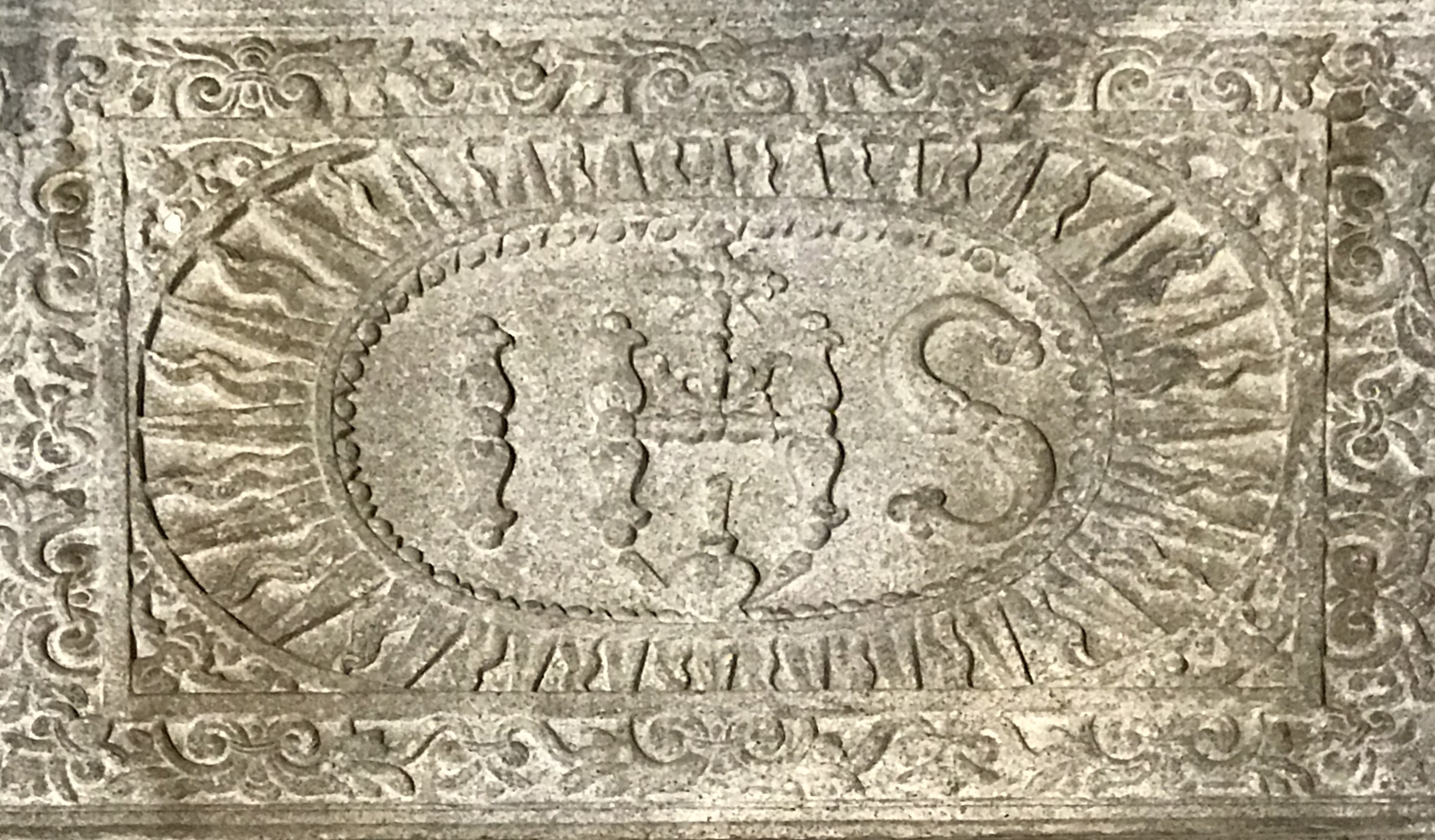
Jesuit symbol on the Saint Paul's Cathedral in Macau, where Vreman lived and worked from 1616 to 1619

It is known about his work and activities that he studied Euclid's work "Elements", which was written in the 4th century BC with the aim of laying foundations for the construction of geometry. Besides, Vreman's special interest was astronomy, where he needed mathematical knowledge in theoretical and practical work and the Euclidean methodology for conducting astronomical proofs. Mathematics is always present in Vreman's work in the field of astronomy and cartography. While researched, he used to solve an astronomical problems with planned observations. Then he applied mathematics in the analysis of his results.

Among the areas that interested him, Vreman investigated magnetic declination. At that time, an explanation was sought that would explain the nature of the phenomena of both declination and inclination. Related to magnetic declinations was Vreman's work on determining geographical coordinates. According to his observations, he determined the differences between Asian and European time and defined the positions of towns like Goa, Macau and others as well. He contributed to the precise determination of the latitude of Macau by mastering one of the methods of determining latitude. Since he defined the geographical coordinates of places, he can be considered one of the forerunners of Croatian cartography.

=== Death in China ===
In 1619 Vreman managed to secretly enter inland China. He continued to teach mathematics and to study Chinese astronomy, wishing to expand his knowledge about it, compare it with European astronomy and contribute to the transfer of knowledge from one tradition to another. At that time, he translated into Italian and Latin the reports of Portuguese missionaries in Catholic missions in Japan. His translations echoed in Europe and aroused such great interest that they were reprinted several times in three other European languages.

In China he lived and worked in difficult conditions, like many other missionaries in the Far East, fell ill, gradually became very exhausted and skinny, and finally died on 22 April 1620 in Nanchang, at the age of thirty six. He was buried in Nanjing, 500 kilometers away, where there was a cemetery where deceased priests had already been buried.

== See also ==
- List of Catholic clergy scientists
- List of Catholic missionaries to China
- List of Jesuits
- List of Jesuit sites

== Sources ==
- Borić, Marijana (2021). "Ivan Ureman — posrednik između kineske i europske znanstvene tradicije" [Ivan Ureman — a Mediator between Chinese and European Scientific Tradition]. Renewed Life: Journal of Philosophy and Religious Studies (in Croatian). 76 (4). Zagreb, Croatia: Institute of Philosophy and Theology of Society of Jesus: 499–512. doi:10.31337/oz.76.4.5. ISSN 1849-0182.
- Ruiz de Medina, Juan (2000) [1990]. "Ivan Vreman, Split 1583 - Nanchang 1620, a Croat among the Jesuit missionaries of Japan and China". In Pozaić, Valentin (ed.). Jesuits among the Croats: Proceedings of the international symposium 'Jesuits in the religious, scientific and cultural life among the Croats' (Zagreb, October 8-11, 1990). Zagreb: Institute of Philosophy and Theology - Croatian Historical Institute – via arts.kuleuven.
- Peng, Yuchao (2024) [2022-04-14]. "The First Croatian to Arrive in China, Jesuit Ivan Vreman (1583–1620)". Chinese Journal of Slavic Studies. 4 (1). Berlin: de Gruyter: 138–151. doi:10.1515/cjss-2024-0007. ISSN 2747-7487 – via digital.zlb.
