= Kambia, Sierra Leone =

Kambia
- District headquarters
- Location in Sierra Leone
- Coordinates: 9°07′N 12°55′W
- Country: Sierra Leone
- Province: North West Province
- District: Kambia District

Population (current estimate)
  - Total: 40,000
- Time zone: UTC-5 (GMT)

Kambia also commonly known as Kambia Town is the capital and largest town of Kambia District in the North West Province of Sierra Leone. Kambia is a major trading town; and lies approximately 120 miles north-east of Freetown. The town had a population of 11,842 in the 2004 census, with a 2010 estimate being 12,471 and a current estimate of 40,000. Kambia is a major trading route along the main highway linking Sierra Leone's capital Freetown to Conakry, the capital of Guinea.

Kambia town is inhabited by different ethnic groups. The Krio language is the primary language of communication among the different ethnic groups in Kambia town. The town is predominantly Muslim.

== History ==
Before the British and Portuguese arrived in Sierra Leone, a farmer/hunter named Pa Kambi settled on the banks of the river where Kambia lies today. As other natives from neighbouring locales wandered about, they discovered Pa Kambi thriving on his trades. They, too, decided to settle down and named the area Kambia, meaning the town of Pa Kambi.

== Languages ==
The Temne language is the most widely spoken language in the town of Kambia, although most Kambia residents can also speak both the Susu language and Temne language. The city is predominantly Muslim.
