= Kambia District =

- Location of Kambia District in Sierra Leone
- Coordinates: 9°10′N 12°45′W
- Country: Sierra Leone
- Province: North West Province
- Capital: Kambia
- Largest city: Kambia

Government
  - Type: District Council
  - District Council Chairman: Mohamed Yayah Bangura (NGC)
  - Deputy District Council Chairman: Mohamed M Sumah (NGC)

Area
  - Total: 3,031 km^{2} (1,170 sq mi)

Population (2021 census)
  - Total: 367,699
  - Density: 121.3/km^{2} (314.2/sq mi)
- Time zone: UTC-5 (Greenwich Mean Time)
- HDI (2017): 0.380 low · 11th

Kambia District is a district in the North West Province of Sierra Leone. Its capital and largest city is the town of Kambia. As of the 2015 census, The District had a population of 343,686. Kambia District borders the Republic of Guinea to the north, Port Loko District to the south and Karene District to the east. The district provides an important trade route to or from the Sierra Leonean capital Freetown to the Guinean capital Conakry.

The district occupies a total area of 3,108 km^{2} (1,200 sq mi) and is divided into seven chiefdoms.

Kambia District is overwhelmingly Muslim majority. The population of the district is ethnically diverse. Kambia District is home to the largest population of ethnic Susu in Sierra Leone. Most of the Susu people in Sierra Leone live in Kambia District. The Susu along with the Temne form one of the largest ethnic groups in the district.

== History ==
Before the British and Portuguese arrived in Sierra Leone, a farmer and hunter named Pa Kambi settled on the banks of the river where Kambia lies today. As other natives from neighboring locales wandered about, they discovered Pa Kambi thriving on his trades. They, too, decided to settle down and named the area Kambia, meaning the town of Pa Kambi.

The Kambia District was formed in 1928 as a split of the Karene District and Port Loko District. Population in the district has increased steadily over the past 42 years: from 137,806 in 1963, to 155,341 in 1974 to 186,231 in 1985 to the 2004 population of 270,460.

== Demographics ==
The district is inhabited by many of Sierra Leone's ethnic groups, however the largest and most prominent ethnic groups in the district are the Temne, Susu, Limba, Fula and Mandingo.

=== Religion ===
Religion in Kambia District (2015)
| Religion | Percent(%) |
| Islam | 94.1% |
| Christianity | 5.3% |
| Baháʼí | 0.0% |
| Traditional African religions | 0.0% |
| Other | 0.3% |
| No religion | 0.3% |

== International Health Operations in the district ==
Kambia District is home to several international health operations, including the International Medical Corps who arrived in 2001, Kambia Appeal, a United Kingdom-based non-profit organization that has operated in Kambia since 1992 and Doctors without Borders, a France-based medical non-profit agency that operates across the world in poverty-stricken areas.

== Government ==
The District has seven representatives in the Sierra Leonean parliament, of which six were elected for a 5-year term. The district is stronghold of the National Grand Coalition Party (NGC). Following is a list of the 7 Representatives and their affiliations:

| Name | Party |
|---|---|
| Foday Mario Kamara | NGC |
| Alusine Osaio Kamara | APC |
| Abdul Karim Kamara | APC |
| Bai Sama Kamara | NGC |
| Abdul Titus Kamara | NGC |
| Kandeh Yumkella | NGC |
| P.C. Bai Farama Tass Bubu Ngbnak IV | Non |

== Administrative divisions ==
=== Chiefdoms ===
==== Pre-2017 ====
Prior to the 2017 local administrative reorganization, Kambia District was made up of seven chiefdoms as the third level of administrative subdivision.

1. Bramaia – Kukuna
2. Gbinle Dixing – Tawuya
3. Magbema – Kambia
4. Mambolo – Mambolo
5. Masungbala – Kawula
6. Samu – Kychum
7. Tonko Limba – Madina

==== Post-2017 ====
After the 2017 local administrative reorganization, Kambia District has made up of ten chiefdoms as the third level of administrative subdivision.

1. Bramaia – Kukuna
2. Dixing (Note: Formerly part of Gbinle Dixing Chiefdom; split off.) – Mafaray
3. Gbinle – Tawuya
4. Khonimakha (Note: Formerly part of Bramaia Chiefdom.) – Kabaya
5. Magbema – Kambia
6. Mambolo – Mambolo
7. Masungbala – Kawula
8. Munu Thala (Note: Formerly part of Masungbala Chiefdom.) – Thala
9. Samu – Kychum
10. Tonko Limba – Madina

== Condition ==
All the chiefdoms had medical centres or posts with the only referral hospital located in Kambia town, the district headquarters town. There are less transport facilities in almost all these places to the headquarters town. This made it possible for the highest number of death rate especially infant and maternal mortality in Kambia than all other districts in the country. There are 13 secondary schools in the district, located in Kambia town, Rokupr, Kasirie, Kychom, Mambolo, Tombowala, Madina, Kamassassa and Kukuna; three of the 13 of the secondary schools together with the hospital were all burnt down in February 1999 during the intensive fighting in the district, while the remaining 10 were systematically vandalised to an extent of completely ruining them.

As the district was hit later by the war than most other areas of Sierra Leone, it hosted a huge number of Internally Displaced Persons (IDPs) until September 1998 when it sustained a heavy rebel attack by the RUF rebel fighters. Much of the population, together with over 40,000 IDPs who had sought refuge in the district fled to neighbouring Guinea. The inhabitants of this district constitute the majority of the refugees in the Forecariah prefecture (District).

== Economy ==
The district is considered as the main rice bowl of Sierra Leone. It has a large agricultural zone with extensive swamp areas found in every chiefdom, but more in the south-west, dominated by mangroves and large river estuaries. The rest of the vegetation consists of a mix between forest to the south and grassland or savannah to the north east. With annual rainfall above 2,500mm, the district has an impressive potential for upland, inland valley swamp and mangrove swamp farming.

The population is mainly farmers, practising off-season activities such as gardening, hunting and as migrant labour. The major food crops grown by the people are, rice (the staple food), cassava, millet, sweet potatoes and sorghum, while groundnuts and maize constitute the major cash crops.

In addition to farming, fishing along the many river estuaries and streams is practised by a large proportion of the population of the district. Fishing is an important source of income for the district, as traders come from other areas on both sides of the border to the fishing Islands and enclaves. This sector more than any other, demonstrates the division of labour between men and women in the community. While the men are the fishers, the fish trade is completely dominated by the women.

Animal raising of sheep and goats on small-scale units has declined because of forced sales in order to compensate for the chronic fall in agricultural production and the subsequent rural poverty.

Cattle rearing by groups of resident Fullahs in the North-east of the district has similarly disappeared as they have migrated to Guinea, due to the protracted civil war. An FAO report in 1996 stated that 40% of Sierra Leonean livestock was now in Guinea.

Outside agriculture, commerce is probably the most important source of income for the population. In addition to domestic trade, cross-border trade expanded to all the different chiefdoms in the district. This is due mainly to the growth of outside agriculture; commerce is probably the most important source of the traditional weekly market villages known as the "LOUMAH" along the border. Although disrupted during the war, these weekly markets have resumed and increased in number from 5 in the pre-war period to 15, with traders coming from various parts of both countries, from as far as Conakry, Nzerekore, Macenta and Faranah in Guinea and from provincial Headquarters towns of Bo, Kenema, Kono, Makeni and the capital city of Freetown, giving these village markets a true international character. The products offered are mainly agricultural and food products, clothes and some imported consumer goods.

Like other commercial activities, women traders from both sides of the border were the principal sellers in such markets, travelling from one town and village to the other. However men are increasingly participating in commerce and a pattern of division of labour between sexes can be observed as the women trade mainly in agricultural products and processed food items while the men trade mainly in imported consumer goods.

== Problems of the district ==
Kambia District was the last to experience the civil war, with the first wave of attacks by the Revolutionary United Front (RUF) in January 1995 and later in 1998. Finally, in February 1999, the rebels occupied all the major towns in the district including the headquarters town of Kambia until disarmament in May 2001. It is also here that the reintegration efforts have been less successful and have fallen victim to donor fatigue.

In the early phase of the war, this border district functioned as host for a large number of internally displaced persons and transit zones for refugees. Later in the war, it became an operational zone and no-man's land for fighters of various factions. During the last year of the war and the disarmament period, it became the station for thousands of International peacekeeping forces (ECOMOG and UNAMSIL). Similarly the neighbouring district of Forecariah has been host to over 210,000 officially registered refugees (residing in 10 camps) during the civil conflict. Over 60% of these refugees originated from the Kambia district. It is estimated that more than 90% of them have now returned to their various communities in the district.

Secondly, in addition to the domestic war, most of the heavy fighting between the Guinean troops and the rebels to dislodge the invading rebel forces from Guinea occurred in the district. As a result, the district suffered one of the highest rates of population displacement and possibly the worst infrastructure destruction.

It is also significant to note that, the rebel invasion of Kambia town in 1995 was one of the first occasions in which children were abducted in large numbers since all the schools were in session when the town was invaded. Most of these children are now young adults and have returned to the community without passing through any formal demobilisation process and with very little resettlement and social reintegration support.

A major consideration is that the large majority of these young people are unemployed. A small proportion of them survive on occasional casual labour opportunities as porters, cleaners and dancers. But by far their most important sources of survival are the smuggling of goods, mostly drugs, alcohol, cigarettes and light arms across the border, juvenile delinquencies, and as sex workers and concubines of the large number of national armies, peace-keeping forces, Para-militaries and long distance travellers.

Since the end of the war in both countries early 2002, the district has witnessed regular and large-scale movements of people across the border. The reasons include the return of thousands of refugees and visits by relatives. But by far the most important factor is the rapid revival of the cross-border trade in the traditional weekly market towns and villages on both sides of the border. These markets, traditionally known as ‘Loumah’ have increased from 5 in the pre-war period to 15. Moreover, they now attract thousands of traders and other visitors from large and far-off towns including the capital cities (Freetown and Conakry) and mining areas of both countries.

In addition to the Loumah towns and villages, the district also has several large towns such as Rokupr, Mambolo, Kassiri, Kukuna, Kamassassa, Kychom and Yeliboya that are famous for their trade in fish and agricultural produce such as rice, groundnuts, palmoil and pepper and as ports for inland water transportation to destinations in both Guinea and the rest of Sierra Leone, including the capitals of Freetown and Conakry. These factors have encouraged a relatively large concentration of young people in these towns.

Discussions with members of the community indicated that in addition to the consequences of the civil war, a major problem is the insufficient support for food production. Food scarcity is widespread and is one of the reasons for an increase in the number of street children, since few families could afford sufficient food.

The current low levels of agricultural production and poor harvest of rice (the staple food) and groundnuts (the most important commercial crop for the district) are bound to reduce income even further and exacerbate the food problem. Similarly, support for income generation activities and self-employment opportunities are lacking, leaving members of the community especially young people with little alternative means of subsistence.
