= Alexios Mosele =

Alexios Mosele (Ancient Greek: Ἀλέξιος Μωσηλέ), sometimes also Musele or Mousele (Μουσηλέ), may refer to:

- Alexios Mosele (general), Byzantine general under Emperor Constantine VI
- Alexios Mosele (Caesar), son-in-law of Byzantine Emperor Theophilos
- Alexios Mosele (admiral) (died 922), Byzantine admiral under Romanos I
