= Joseph Freinademetz =

Ladin Catholic priest and missionary

Saint Joseph Freinademetz SVD
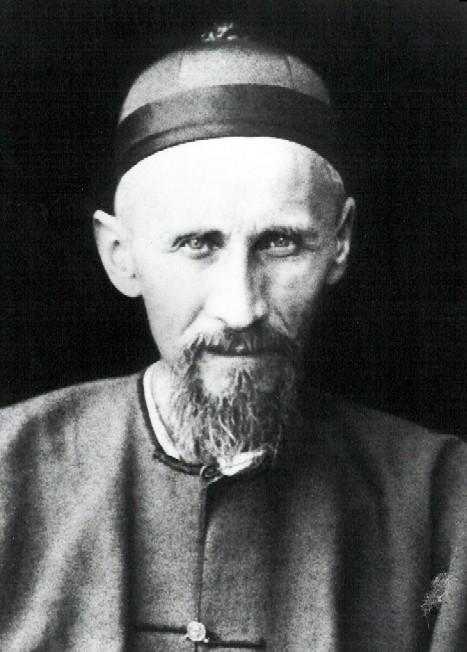

Missionary to China
- Born: April 15, 1852; Badia, County of Tyrol, Austrian Empire
- Died: January 28, 1908 (aged 55); Daijiazhuang, Jining, South Shandong, Chinese Empire
- Venerated in: Catholic Church (Society of the Divine Word), (China)
- Beatified: 19 October 1975 by Pope Paul VI
- Canonized: October 5, 2003 by Pope John Paul II
- Feast: January 29

Joseph Freinademetz SVD (simplified Chinese: 圣福若瑟; traditional Chinese: 聖福若瑟; pinyin: Shèng Fú Ruòsè; April 15, 1852 – January 28, 1908), was a Ladin Catholic priest and missionary in China. He was a member of the Society of the Divine Word.

Freinademetz's sainthood cause was opened after his death in 1908, and he was canonized by Pope John Paul II in 2003.

== Early life ==
Freinademetz was born the fourth among the 13 children of Giovanmattia and Anna Maria Freinademetz in Oies, a section of the town of Badia, which was then in the County of Tyrol, a part of the Austrian Empire, now a part of Italy. He studied theology in the diocesan seminary of Brixen and was ordained a priest on July 25, 1875. He was assigned to the community of San Martin de Tor, not far from his own home.

During his studies and the three years in San Martino, Freinademetz always felt a calling to be a missionary. He contacted Arnold Janssen, founder of the Society of the Divine Word, a missionary congregation based in Steyl, Netherlands. With the permission of his parents and his bishop, he moved to Steyl in August 1878, where he received training as a missionary.

== Missionary work ==
In March 1879, he and his confrere Johann Baptist von Anzer boarded a ship to Hong Kong, where they arrived five weeks later. They stayed there for two years. Freinademetz was based in Sai Kung Peninsula until 1880 and set up a chapel on the island of Yim Tin Tsai in 1879. In 1881 they moved to the southern region of the Province of Shandong, to which they had been assigned. At the time of their arrival, there were 12 million people living in that province, of which 158 had been baptized.

Freinademetz was very active in the education of Chinese laymen and priests. He wrote a catechism in Chinese, which he considered a crucial part of their missionary effort. In 1898, he was sick with laryngitis and tuberculosis, so Anzer, who had become the bishop of the region, and other priests convinced him to go to Japan to recuperate. He returned, but was still not fully cured. When Anzer had to leave China for a journey to Europe in 1907, the administration of the diocese was assigned to Freinademetz.

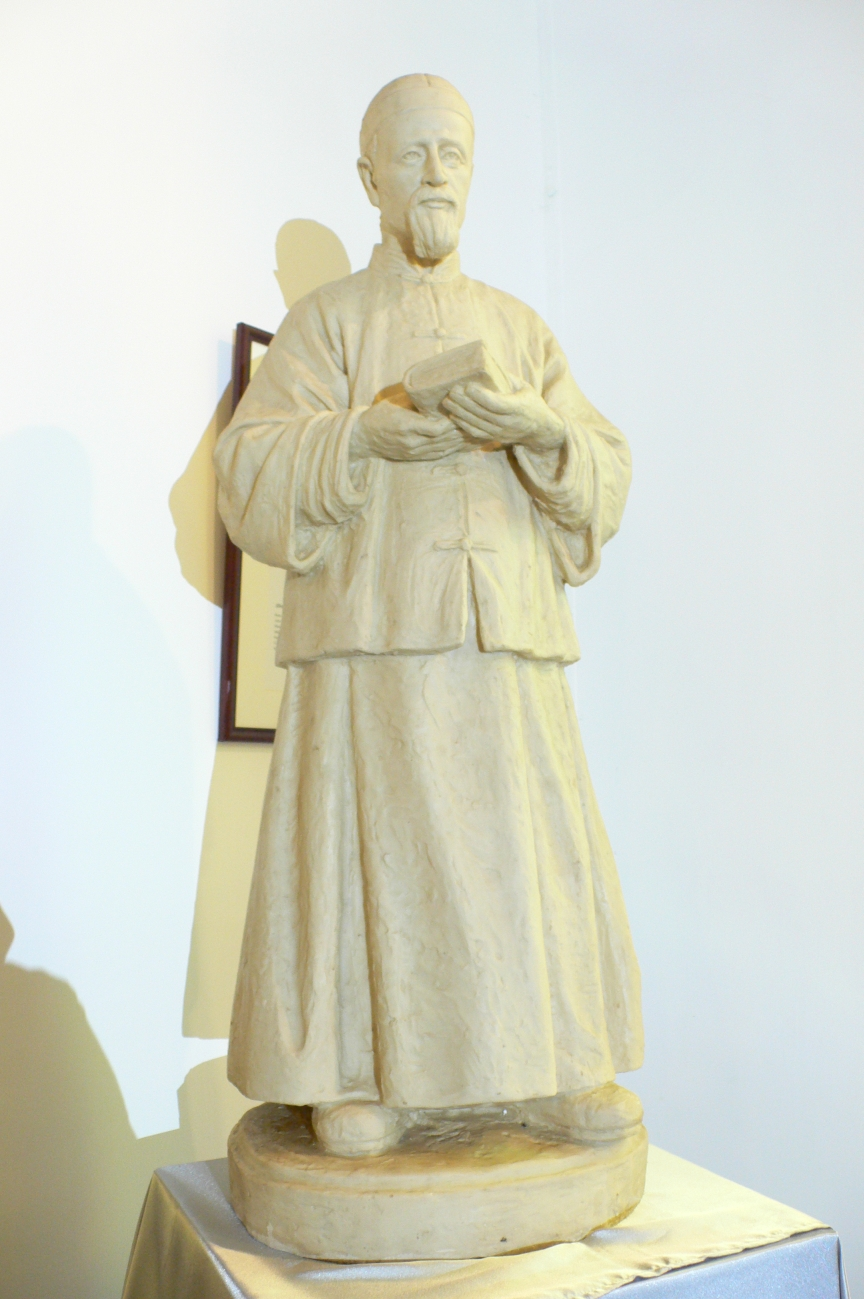
Statue of St. Joseph Freinademetz, S.V.D.
St Joseph's Chapel,
Yim Tin Tsai, Hong Kong, China

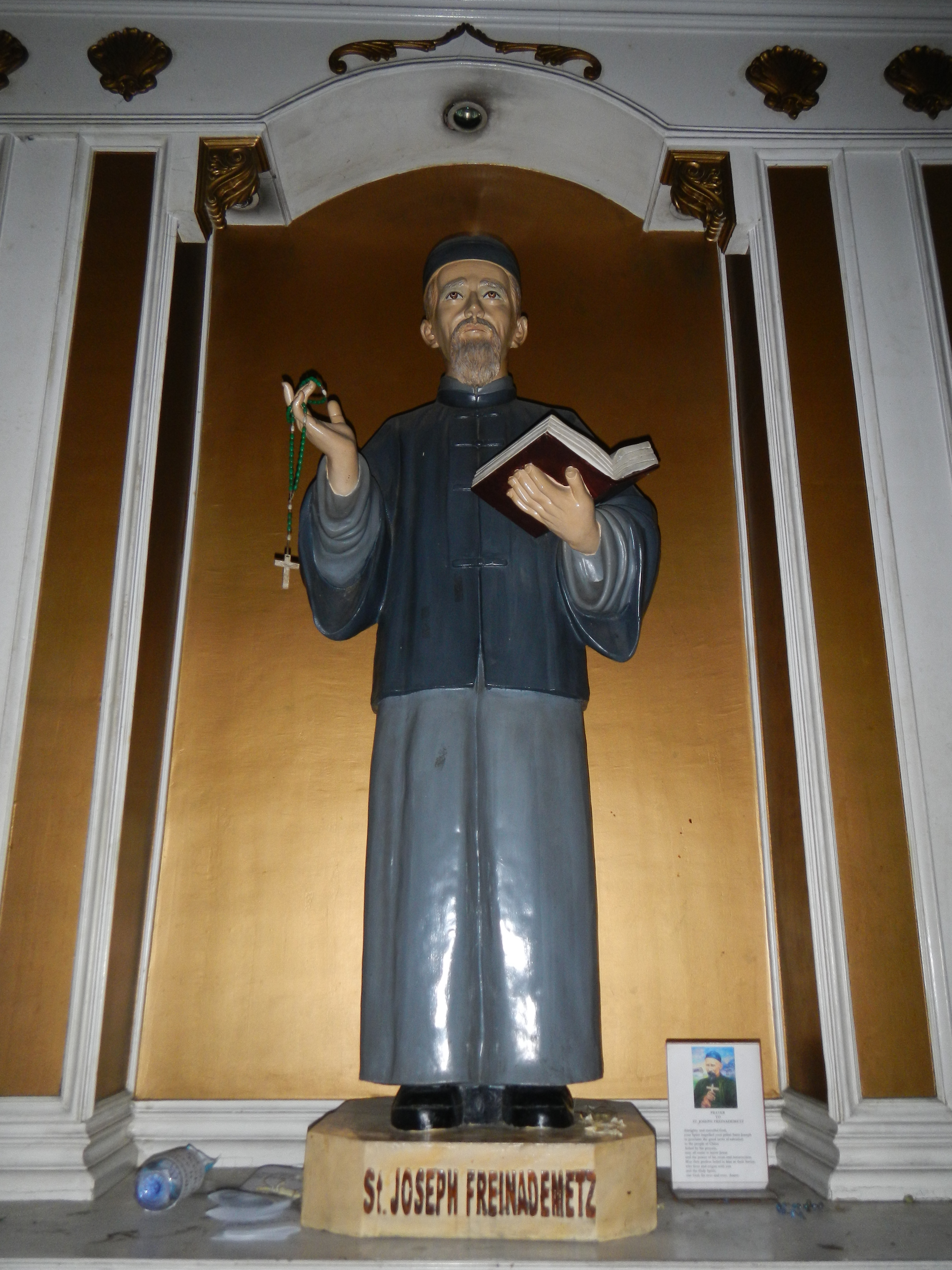
Statue of St. Joseph Freinademetz, S.V.D.
St Joseph's Chapel, Sacred Heart Parish Kamuning, Philippines

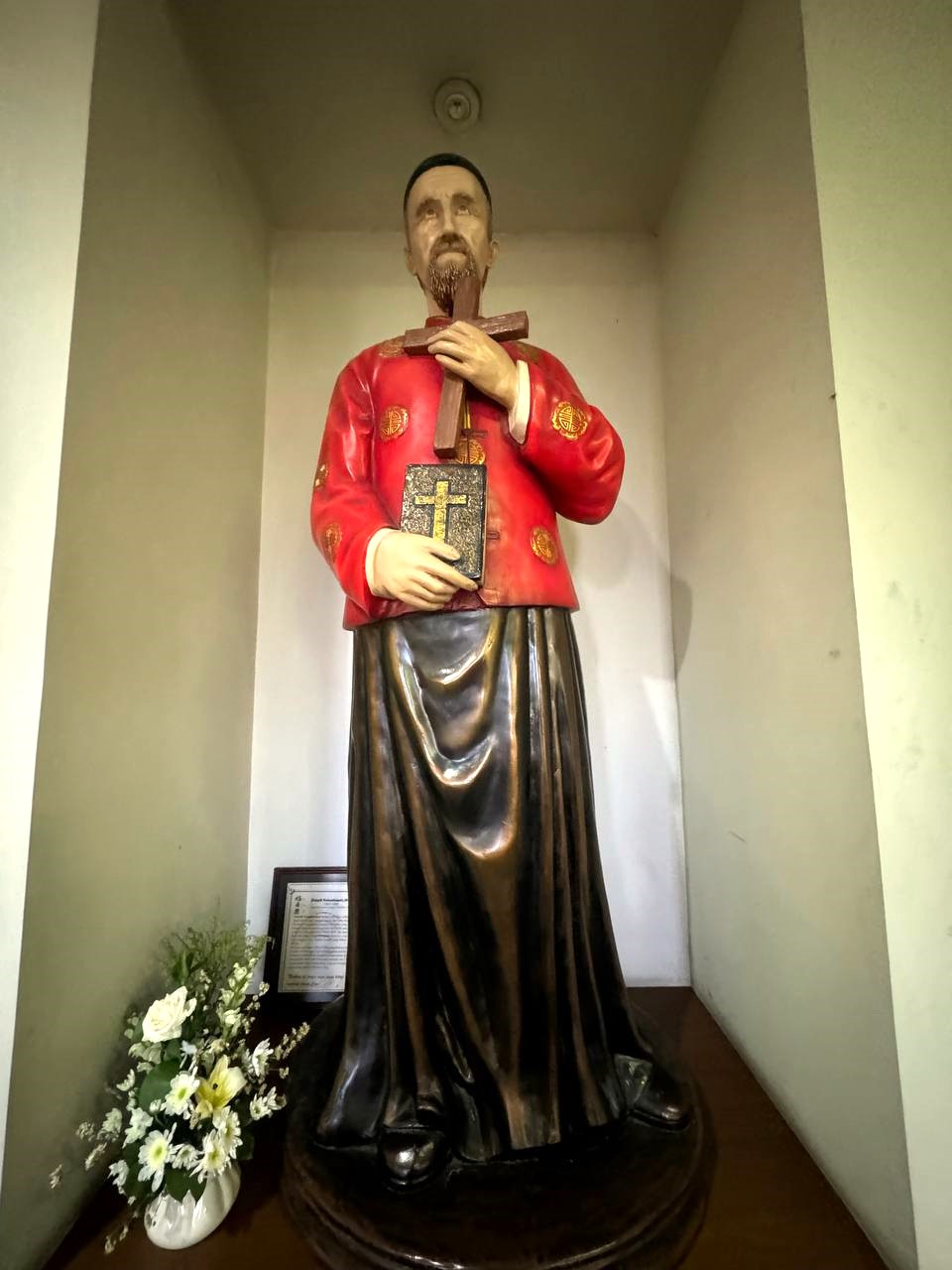
Statue of St. Joseph Freinademetz, S.V.D.
St Michael Church,
Kranji, Bekasi, West Java, Indonesia

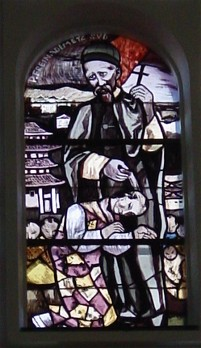
Stained glass image of Freinademetz,
Liesing, Vienna, Austria

== Death ==
There was an outbreak of typhus in this time, and he helped wherever he could, until he himself became infected. He returned to Daijiazhuang (Chinese: 戴家庄; pinyin: Dàijiāzhuāng, historically spelled "Taikia" or "Taichia"), Rencheng District, Jining, South Shandong, where he died from typhus. He was buried in Daijiazhuang, at the twelfth station on the Way of the Cross.

== Legacy ==
Freinademetz's spiritual writings were approved by theologians on 20 November 1940, and his cause was formally opened on 22 June 1951, granting him the title of Servant of God. Freinademetz, together with Arnold Janssen, the founder of his Society, was canonized on October 5, 2003, by Pope John Paul II, as was Daniele Comboni, the founder of the Comboni Missionaries, which works in Africa.

Under his patronage is the St. Joseph Freinademetz German National Parish in Beijing, a parish for German-speaking residents and visitors.

== Works ==
- Joseph Freinademetz, Sanctissimum Novae Legis Sacrificium, 1.ed., Verlag der katholischen Mission: Yenchowfu (China) 1915, VII + 161 pp. 2.ed. Typographia Apostolica Domus Missionum ad S. Michaelem, Steyl 1948, VIII + 141 pp.
- Josef Freinademetz SVD, Berichte aus der China-Mission, (also in: Analecta SVD 27, 1973) Apud Collegium Verbi Divini, Romae 1974, 171 pp.
- José Freinademetz, Relatos de la mision en China, Editorial Verbo Divino, Estella (Navarra) 1976, 219 pp., ISBN 84-7151-199-1.
- Joseph Freinademetz, Über den Geist der Societas Verbi Divini Divini, (Analecta SVD 40) Romae 1977, 91 pp.
- Joseph Freinademetz, The Most Holy Sacrifice of the New Covenant, translated by Stan Plutz SVD, Tagaytay (Philippines) 1980, 2. ed. 1986, 146 pp.
- Richard Hartwoch (ed.), Arnold Janssen and Joseph Freinademetz. Correspondence between two saints (1904-1907), (Analecta SVD - 97), Apud Collegium Verbi Divini: Romae 2008, 287 pp.
- Josef Freinademetz, Briefe an die Heimat, ed. by P. Lothar Janek SVD, Sekretariat Josef Freinademetz: Abtei/South Tyrol (BZ) 2009, 199 pp.

== Literature ==
- Philip Clart: Die Religionen Chinas. Stuttgart 2009. ISBN 978-3-8252-3260-3 (in German)
- Karl Josef Rivinus: Anfänge der Missionstätigkeit der Steyler Missionare (SVD) in China unter der Berücksichtigung des politischen und sozialen Umfeldes des P. Josef Freinademetz (in German)
- Johannes Baur: P. Joseph Freinademetz SVD. Steyler Verlag 1956. ISBN B0000BG7A0 (in German)
- Clifford J. King, S.V.D., A Man of God - Joseph Freinademetz. Pioneer Divine Word Missionary, Divine Word Publications: Techny, Illinois 1959, 144 pp.
- John Fleckner SVD, Father Freinademetz’ Requirements in a missionary, in: Verbum S.V.D 4:4 (1962) p. 403-414.
- Jacob Reuter, SVD, Blessed Joseph Freinademetz S.V.D. South Tyrol’s Outstanding Missionary to the Far East, English translation by John Vogelgesang, Divine Word College (SVD): Rome 1975, p. 30.
- Fritz Bornemann SVD (ed.), A History of the Divine Word Missionaries, Divine Word College: Rome 1981. (internally published as: A History of our Society, Analecta SVD 54/2, Romae 1981, 434 pp.
- Fritz Bornemann SVD, As wine poured out. Blessed Joseph Freinademetz. Missionary in China 1879-1908, Divine Word Missionaries, Rome 1984, 485 pp.
- Jakob Reuter: Josef Freinademetz: Künder des Glaubens im Fernen Osten. 1985. ISBN 3-87787-191-7 (in German)
- Karl Müller, Freinademetz, Joseph, in: Gerald H. Anderson (ed.), Biographical Dictionary of Christian Missions, Simon & Schuster Macmillan: New York 1998, p. 226, ISBN 0-02-864604-5
- Josef Alt, El mundo en un meson. Vida u Obra misionera de Arnoldo Janssen, Editorial Verbo Divino, Cochabamba/Bolivia 2002, 1149 pp., ISBN 99905-1-020-2.
- Josef Alt, SVD (ed.): Arnold Janssen SVD, Briefe nach China. Band I: 1879-1897, (Studia Instituti Missiologici SVD 73), Steyler Verlag: Nettetal 2000, 447 pp., ISBN 3-8050-0446-X.
- Josef Alt (ed.): Arnold Janssen SVD, Briefe nach China. Band II: 1897-1904, (Studia Instituti Missiologici SVD 74), Steyler Verlag: Nettetal 2001, XXI + 374 pp., ISBN 3-8050-0447-8.
- Josef Alt (ed.): Arnold Janssen SVD, Briefe nach China. Band III: 1904-1908, (Studia Instituti Missiologici SVD 75), Steyler Verlag: Nettetal 2002, XV + 313 pp., ISBN 3-8050-0448-6.
- Josef Alt (ed.): Arnold Janssen SVD, Letters to China. Vol 1: 1879-1897, (Studia Instituti Missiologici SVD 80), Steyler Verlag: Nettetal 2003, 544 pp., ISBN 3-8050-0490-7.
- Josef Alt, Journey of Faith. The Missionary Life of Arnold Janssen, (Studia Instituti Missiologici SVD 78), Steyler Verlag, Nettetal 2002, XVIII + 1078 pp., ISBN 3-8050-0471-0.
- Manfred Müller, Bibliography Concerning St. Arnold Janssen and St. Joseph Freinademetz, Apud Collegium Verbi Divini: Romae 2004 (Last Update: 2006-11-29),
- Paul B. Steffen, Witness and Holiness, the Heart of the Life of Saint Joseph Freinademetz of Shandong, in: Studia Missionalia 61 (Roma 2012) 257–392, ISBN 978-88-7839-225-0.
