= North West Province, Sierra Leone =

Province of Sierra Leone

North West Province Nɔt Wɛst Prɔvins
- Province
- Country: Sierra Leone
- Capital: Port Loko

Area
  - Total: 13,520 km^{2} (5,220 sq mi)

Population (2021 census)
  - Total: 1,162,065
  - Density: 85.95/km^{2} (222.6/sq mi)
- Time zone: UTC0 (Greenwich Mean Time)

The North West Province, (Krio: Nɔt Wɛst Prɔvins) also known as North Western Province (Krio: Nɔt Wɛstɛn Prɔvins), covers the northwestern part of the West African state of Sierra Leone. It is one of the five administrative regions of Sierra Leone. The province was created in 2017 from the Northern Province. The three districts of Kambia, Karene and Port Loko make up the North Western Province of Sierra Leone. The province has a total of 34 Chiefdoms. It covers an area of 13,520 km^{2} and a population of 1,162,065 inhabitants (as of 2021). The administrative capital of the North West province is Port Loko.

== Borders ==
The North Western Province has the following borders:

- Kindia Region, Guinea: north
- Mamou Region, Guinea: north
- North Province: east
- Western Area: southwest
- Southern Province: south.

=== Economic activities ===
The main economic activities in the North West province is farming, livestock, fishing and natural resources, including rutile, gold, aluminium, bauxite and diamond.

The Temne people is by far the largest single ethnic group in the North West, especially in Port Loko and Karine Districts where the Temne is a large majority. The Temne also form the single largest ethnic group, though short of majority, in Kambia District in the North West. Kambia District is more ethnically diverse and home to a significant ethnic minorities population. About 87% of the population of the North Western Province is Muslim; and about 12% Christian.
