= St. Michael's Cathedral, Qingdao =

Catholic church building in China

St. Michael's Cathedral Kathedrale St. Michael (in German) 圣弥爱尔大教堂 (in Chinese)
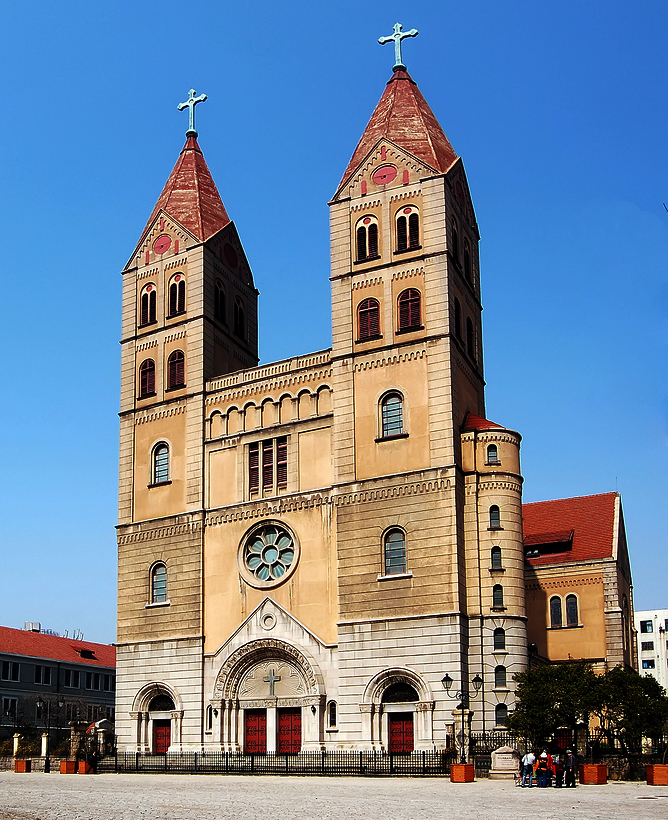
- West front

- Location within China

Religion
- Affiliation: Roman Catholic
- Diocese: Diocese of Qingdao
- Province: Jinan
- Ecclesiastical or organisational status: Cathedral
- Leadership: Bishop Thomas Chen Tianhao
- Year consecrated: 1934
- Status: Active

Location
- Location: China
- Municipality: Qingdao
- Coordinates: 36.067972°N 120.315611°E

Architecture
- Architects: Alfred Fräbel, SVD
- Type: Cathedral
- Style: neo-Romanesque
- General contractor: Arthur Bialucha
- Groundbreaking: 1931
- Completed: 1934

Specifications
- Direction of façade: Southwest
- Capacity: 1000+
- Length: 65.9 metres (216 ft)
- Width: 37.6 metres (123 ft)
- Height (max): 56 metres (184 ft)
- Spire: 2
- Spire height: 56 metres (184 ft)

St. Michael's Cathedral (German: Kathedrale St. Michael; simplified Chinese: 圣弥额尔主教座堂; traditional Chinese: 聖彌額爾主教座堂; pinyin: Shèng Mí'ài'ěr Dàjiàotáng), also called the Zhejiang Road Catholic Church (Chinese: 浙江路天主教堂), is a Catholic church in Qingdao (Tsingtao), Shandong Province, China, and is the seat of the bishop of the Diocese of Qingdao (Tsingtao). It is located in the oldest part of Qingdao, at 15 Zhejiang Road (formerly Bremen Straße), on the east side of Zhongshan Road (formerly Friedrich Straße) in Shinan District. Built by German missionaries, the cathedral stands at the top of a hill in the center of the old German-built part of the city. It is the largest example of Romanesque Revival architecture in the province, resembling a German cathedral of the 12th century.

St. Michael's Cathedral is the product of a strong German presence in Shandong Province in the 19th and early 20th centuries. In the mid-19th century the European powers forcibly opened China to foreign trade. The Divine Word Missionaries built a church in the Jiaozhou Bay concession in Shandong in 1902, and in 1934 erected the cathedral, which remained nominally under their administration until 1964. In 1942 it came under the control of the Japanese Army, returning to Chinese control when the Japanese left Qingdao in 1945. In the early 1950s, all foreign missionaries, including the Bishop of Qingdao, were either imprisoned or expelled from China, and during the Cultural Revolution (1966–1976) the cathedral was defaced and abandoned. In 1981, it was repaired by the government and reopened for services, and in 1992 it was listed as a Provincial Historic Building by the government of Shandong Province.

== History ==
After China's defeat in the First Opium War, the country was forced to open to foreign trade by a number of treaties collectively referred to as the Unequal Treaties. Following the Treaty of Nanjing (1842), the British established the first treaty ports. Following China's concession to the British Empire, Russia won concessions as well. Foreigners, who were centered in foreign sections of the cities, enjoyed legal extraterritoriality as stipulated in the Unequal Treaties. Foreign clubs, racecourses, and churches were established in major treaty ports. Some of these port areas were directly leased by foreign powers, such as the concessions in China, effectively removing them from the control of local governments.

=== German presence in Qingdao ===
In the early 1890s, the German Empire had been considering occupying Jiaozhou Bay ("Jiaozhou" is romanized as Kiaochow, Kiauchau or Kiao-Chau in English and Kiautschou in German) for building its first naval base in East Asia in order to expand into the interior of Shandong. In 1891 the Qing government decided to make Qingdao (commonly spelled "Tsingtao") defensible against naval attack and began to improve the existing fortifications of the town. German naval officials observed and reported on this Chinese activity during a formal survey of Jiaozhou Bay in May 1897. In November 1897, the German Navy seized Jiaozhou Bay under the pretext of ensuring that reparations were paid for the murder of two German Catholic missionaries in the province. In the spring of 1898, the German government signed a treaty that allowed the Germans to lease an area of 540 square kilometres (130,000 acres; 210 sq mi) for 99 years (or until 1997, as the British did in Hong Kong's New Territories and the French did in Kouang-Tchéou-Wan), to construct a railway to Jinan, the capital of Shandong province, and to exploit coalfields along the railroad.

The Kiautschou Bay concession, as it became known, existed from 1898 to 1914. With an area of 552 square kilometres (136,000 acres; 213 sq mi), it was located in the imperial province of Shandong (alternatively romanized as Shantung or Shan-tung in English and Schantung in German) on the southern coast of the Shandong Peninsula (Schantung-Halbinsel) in northern China. Tsingtao (Qingdao) was its administrative center. After the farmers and fishermen of the Chinese village sold their buildings and land and resettled in the rural communities further east, the Germans began to develop the area. Wide streets, solid housing areas, government buildings, electrification throughout, a sewer system and a safe drinking water supply were improvements that transformed the impoverished fishing village of Tsingtao into a modern German town. In a short time the area had the highest density of schools and per capita student enrollment in all of China; primary, secondary and vocational schools were funded by the Imperial German treasury and Protestant and Roman Catholic missions.

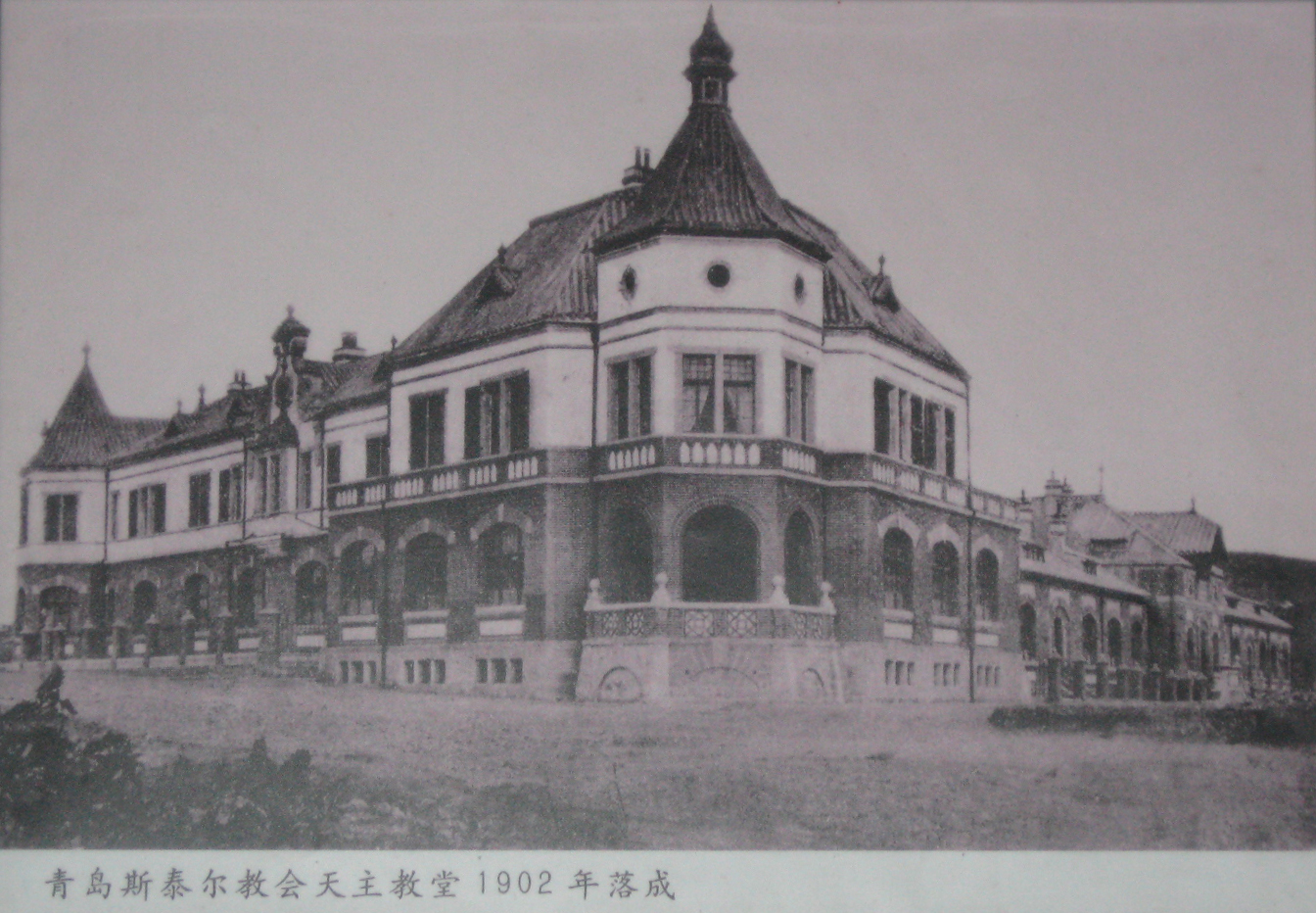
Society of the Divine Word Mission Hall in 1902

The cathedral was built by the Divine Word Missionaries (abbreviated "SVD," from their Latin name: Societas Verbi Divini), the first German Catholic missionary society. The order was founded in 1875 "for the propagation of the Catholic religion among pagan nations," at Steyl (today in the Limburg Province of the Netherlands), by German Catholic priests fleeing the Kulturkampf. The society's first mission was established in 1882 in southern Shantung, a district of more than 10 million people, which contained 158 Catholics. At the time, the area was part of the Apostolic Vicariate of Shantung, managed by Italian Franciscans, who were tasked with rebuilding the earlier Catholic mission work. However, the mission work proceeded slowly, due to insufficient personnel and resources. The southern half of the province, in particular, had been all but neglected. Consequently, it was transferred to the SVD on December 2, 1885, and became the Vicariate Apostolic of Southern Shan-tung. The new vicariate apostolic was headquartered in Yanzhou, Shandong, and headed by Bishop Johann Baptist von Anzer, SVD, who led it until November 24, 1903. By 1907, the mission numbered 35,378 Catholics and 36,367 catechumens, and by 1924, 106,000 Catholics and 44,000 catechumens. The SVD's presence in Qingdao was first recorded when the mission purchased land there in 1899 and began building a mission hall.

=== Design and construction ===
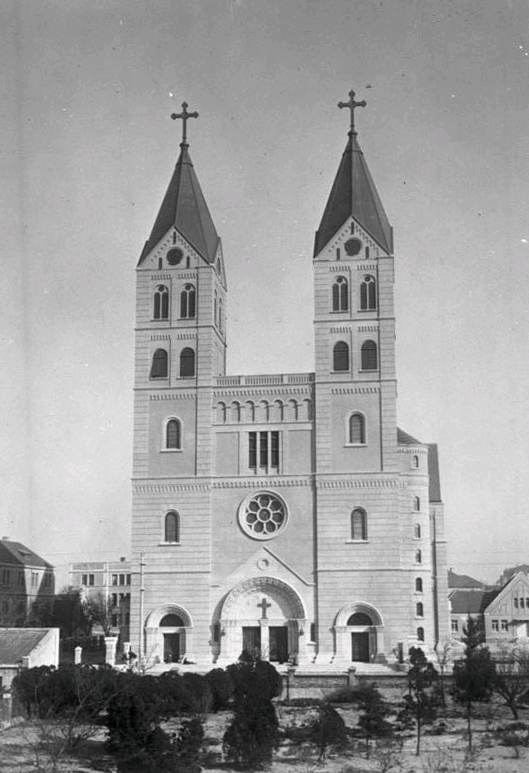
The exterior of St. Michael's Cathedral in 1935

In autumn 1898 Bishop von Anzer had Father Franz Bartels (Note: Father Franz Bartels's Chinese name was Bai Mingde, as per: Tiedemann, R.G. (May 2001). "Conversion Patterns in North China: Sociological Profiles of Chinese Christians 1860–1912". In Ying, Ku Weit; De Ridder, Koen (eds.). Authentic Chinese Christianity, Preludes to Its Development: Nineteenth & Twentieth Centuries. Leuven Chinese Studies. Vol. 9. Leuven University Press. p. 119. ISBN 978-90-5867-102-8. Several sources mention him by his Chinese name only.) appointed as pastor in Qingdao. Bishop von Anzer also commissioned Bartels with planning and constructing the Catholic mission. Bartels initially stayed in a house that was part of a Taoist temple. Adjacent to his house he had a provisional chapel built which served as a place of worship/service for the European inhabitants of Qingdao until 1902 when a mission hall with a chapel was built. Major Kopka von Lossow, commander of the Third Sea Battalion which was stationed in Qingdao, ordered about a hundred of his men to attend services every Sunday.

On a hill chosen by Bishop von Anzer, Father Bartels purchased some land on Qufu Road, having a printing house and the SVD mission hall erected in 1902. The mission hall was converted to a school (Note: Dexian Primary School, on Dexian road.) in 1922, and was operating as of May 2010.

The Holy Ghost Convent was also built on the same hill, occupied by Franciscan sisters who worked as nurses and teachers.

The cathedral's original architect (commissioned by Bishop Augustin Henninghaus) designed a three-aisled Gothic church, but the World War I conquest of Qingdao by the Japanese on November 16, 1914, put an end to the cathedral plans. The city reverted to Chinese rule in December 1922, under control of the Republic of China. The Vicariate Apostolic of Southern Shan-tung was renamed the Vicariate Apostolic of Yanzhoufu on December 13, 1924, and on February 22, 1925, the Apostolic Prefecture of Qingdao was established from its territory, with Bishop Georg Weig, SVD, appointed prefect on March 18 of that same year. On June 14, 1928, it was elevated to a vicariate apostolic. When construction resumed, the original Gothic plan no longer seemed appropriate for the modern townscape of Qingdao. Father Alfred Fräbel designed the present neo-Romanesque structure, built during the tenure of Bishop Weig, who is entombed in the cathedral.

Construction began on May 5, 1931, under Brother Theophorus Kleemann, SVD, who became ill and died on September 12, 1931; Arthur Bialucha, a German architect living in Qingdao who had already completed several projects for the SVD, took over as construction superintendent. Construction was frustrated in 1933, when Adolf Hitler came to power in Germany and prohibited the transfer of money overseas. The diocese independently shouldered the cost of finishing the cathedral. This required a number of design changes to reduce costs. The changes are evident in drawings published before completion of construction, which show the roofs of the towers as bell-shaped. However, the roofs of the completed structure were changed to spires. Construction was finished in 1934, and the cathedral was consecrated on October 28 that year.

Some sources state that St. Michael's Cathedral was originally named "St. Emil's Church". (Note: For example, chinaculture.org and travel websites (e.g. AsiaHotels)) A Latin inscription over the tomb of Bishop Weig states that the cathedral was consecrated to St. Michael the Archangel in 1934. In addition, a photo taken in 1935, currently in the German Federal Archives (Note: The photo is designated as Bundesarchiv Bild (Federal Archive Image) 137-041054, and is available online at Wikimedia Commons) is labeled "St. Michaels Kirche" (St. Michael's Church), and authoritative secondary print sources make no mention of "St. Emil's Church".

=== 1938–1949: occupation, liberation, and civil war ===
The Japanese reoccupied Qingdao in January 1938. Bishop Thomas Tien Ken-sin, SVD, was appointed Vicariate Apostolic of Qingdao, in November 1942, as Bishop Georg Weig had died the year before. That year, the Japanese placed a large sign over the main door of the cathedral that read "Under Management of the Japanese Army". On August 15, 1945, Japan surrendered to Allied forces, officially ending World War II, and in September 1945, Qingdao was liberated by forces of the Kuomintang, restoring the government of the Republic of China. The following year, on February 18, 1946, Bishop Tien was elevated to cardinal, becoming the first Chinese cardinal and to date the only SVD cardinal. He traveled to Vatican City to accept the honor. His vicariate apostolic was elevated to the Diocese of Qingdao on April 11. Upon his return on May 27, he was greeted by representatives of the government of Shandong Province, who had arranged a welcome in his honor, with the United States Marine Band playing outside the main entrance of the cathedral. The Marine Band was attached to Naval Forces Western Pacific, headquartered in Qingdao at the time. During the Civil War period (1946–1949), missionaries in Shandong Province experienced growing tensions with the Communists, spurring one of them, Father Augustin Olbert, SVD, to write:

The Reds do not slacken and will in the end remain victorious. Almost the entire province is in their hands. For the time being they still give face, but when they are firmly established, they will no doubt show us their teeth, as they are already doing in some areas. We are facing the future with much anxiety. Most missionaries are convinced that, once the Reds are in power, they will expel us all.

Father Olbert was appointed Bishop of Qingdao two years later.

On June 2, 1949, the People's Liberation Army entered Qingdao and both the city and Shandong Province have since been under Communist control. Bishop Tien fled to Taiwan with the Kuomintang government.

=== 1949–1976: Under Mao ===
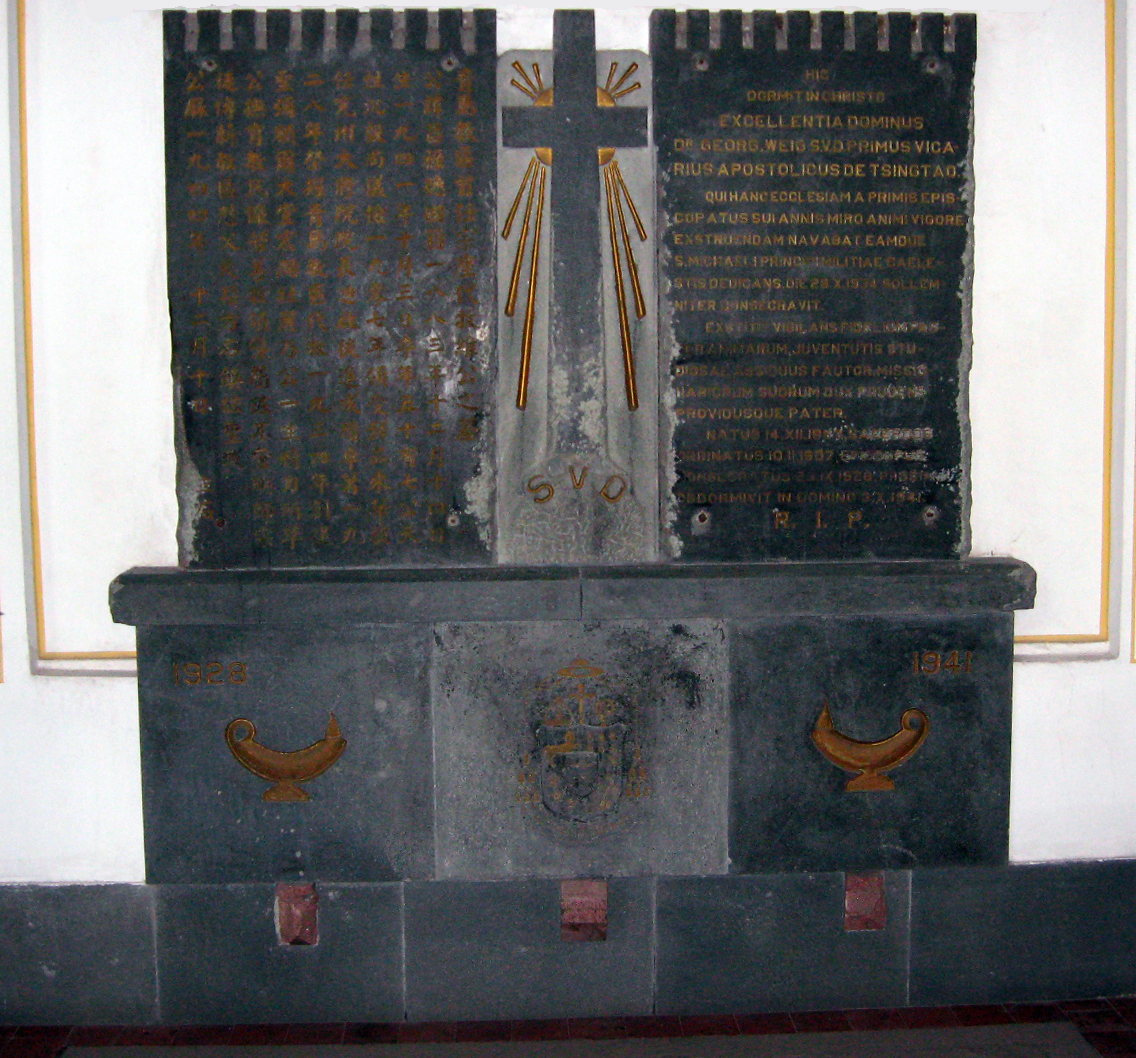
Bishop Georg Weig's tombstone, set into a wall in the north transept. The damage visible was caused during the Cultural Revolution.

Soon after the Communists assumed control, a combination of assertive nationalism and socialist ideology led to the eradication of the Western presence in China, including Western culture and products. "The denunciation of anything Western as 'capitalist,' 'bourgeois' and representative of the 'imperialist world' reached a peak during the ideological extremism of the Korean War (1950–1953) when the final vestiges of the Western economic and cultural presence were eradicated." Missionary and Communist ambitions simply were irreconcilable and the wide ideological gap could not be bridged. The stage had been set for the Communists' catastrophic assault on the missionary enterprise during the Civil War period (1946–1949) and the expulsion of virtually all foreigners in the early 1950s. Foreign missionaries who were suspected of being spies were arrested. Missionary institutes funded by foreign money were closed down and all foreign missionaries expelled from China. The SVD mission was not spared this fate. In 1951, the Diocese of Qingdao's Bishop Augustin Olbert, SVD, was arrested, served 22 months in prison, and was then deported to Germany in 1953. Although the cathedral was closed by the government, Bishop Olbert remained Bishop of Qingdao until his death in 1964. Native Chinese clergy were not spared the government's Marxian contempt for religion during this period. Future Bishop of Qingdao Li Mingshu was sent to prison the same year Bishop Olbert was deported, and not released from labor camps until 1968. Sweeping arrests of Chinese bishops, priests, sisters and laity did not begin, however, until 1955. Afterwards, the Catholic resistance movement, encountering mass arrests and sentences to forced labor, was forced underground. Professor Jean-Paul Wiest, Research Associate at the Centre for the Study of Religion and Chinese Society wrote: "The witness of Bishop Gong Pinmei of Shanghai and many others who chose jail, labor camps, and even death for the sake of their faith and their loyalty to the pope would sustain countless people in the years ahead."

By late 1957, due to the prior expulsion of foreign clergy and the subsequent imprisonment of Chinese clergy, 120 out of 145 dioceses and prefectures apostolic were without ordinaries. The Diocese of Qingdao went without an ordinary until the state-run Chinese Patriotic Catholic Association consecrated and appointed Bishop Paul Han Xirang, OFM, without papal sanction in 1988.

The cathedral was badly damaged during the Cultural Revolution which lasted from 1966 to 1971. During this time St. Michael's Cathedral was defaced by the Red Guards. The crosses topping the twin steeples were removed by the Red Guards, with two men falling to their deaths during the removal. An account of the cathedral's defacement is translated as follows:

One day, scaffolding was tied to the church steeples. People said that the crosses would be removed. The news spread throughout the city. Numerous people watched from windows, from the streets, from the beaches, and from the mountaintops as several small, ghostlike figures climbed up to the crosses. Against the blue sky they opened a saw. It was said that by evening, two people had fallen from the tower and died on the spot. People also say that this church held one of the greatest pipe organs in China. They say that when it played, the whole city could hear its music. But this rare treasure was also destroyed by the Red Guards. The next morning, seeing the towers of the church, the steeple had been denuded, and the towers were bald, like the shaved heads of criminals. The onlookers felt extremely uncomfortable, as if the whole area had been corrupted; made evil. Not long after that, I occasionally passed by the church and was astonished to see the topped crosses: what originally appeared to be two thin needles [when viewed from the towers] was actually the size of two coarse, heavy men, one taller than the other. Since then, the cathedral has become a warehouse.

The original crosses were rescued by local Catholics and buried in the hills. The 2400-pipe organ destroyed by the Red Guards had been one of the two largest in Asia.

=== Restoration ===
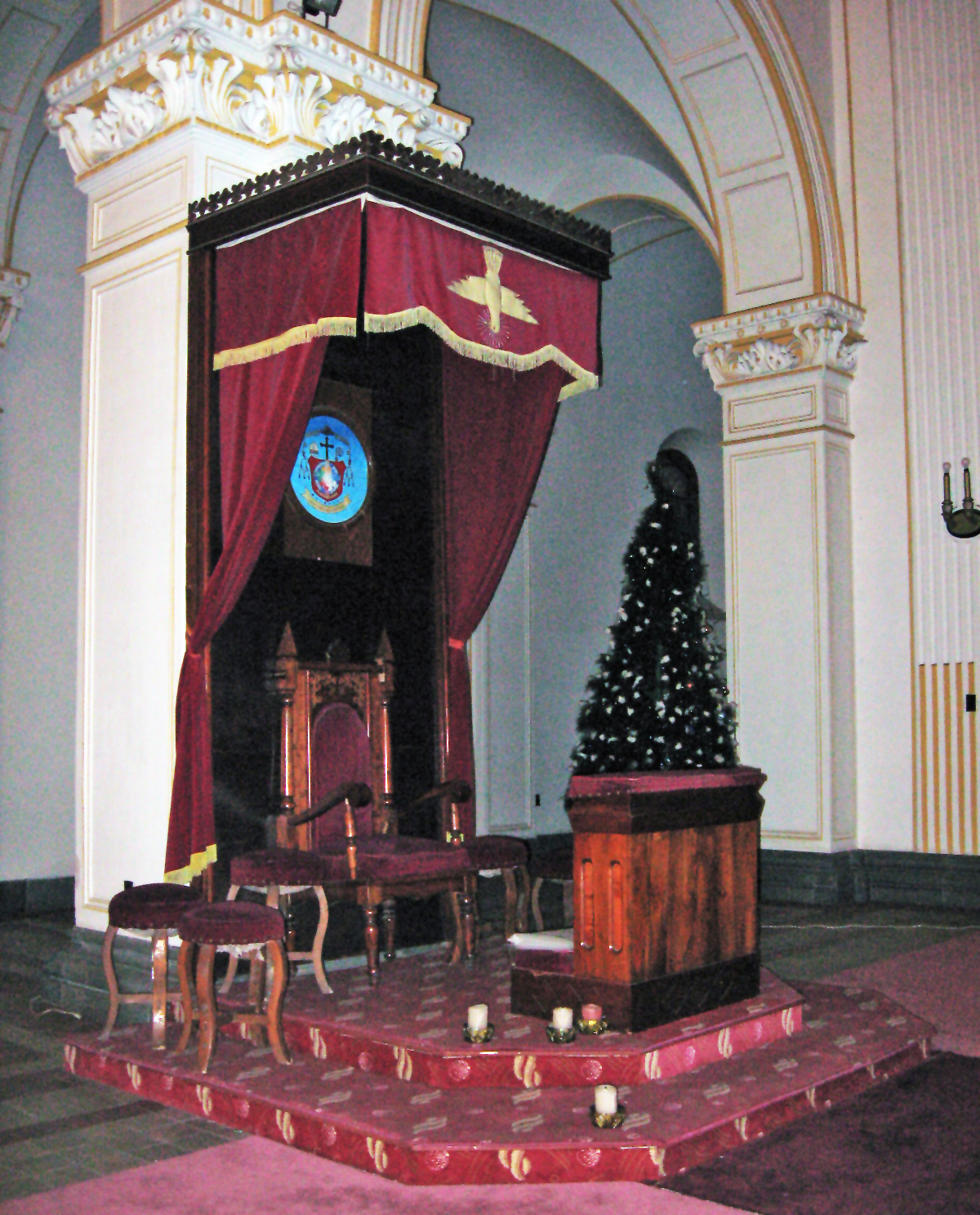
The cathedra of the Bishop of Qingdao

The Chinese Communist Party (CCP) subsequently repudiated the Cultural Revolution. The change in prevailing political views was favourable to St. Michael's Cathedral; the Chinese government funded the cathedral's restoration efforts. New crosses were manufactured for the cathedral's restoration, and "after several years of repair, [the cathedral] was re-opened in April 1981" for religious worship. In May 1999 the church was opened to the general public, allowing entry when Mass or other liturgies are not being celebrated. In 2005, city workers repairing water pipes accidentally found the original crosses buried on Longshan Road, not far from the cathedral. They are currently stored in the north transept. The cathedral has been listed on the register of Provincial Historic Buildings by the government of Shandong Province since 1992.

The change in prevailing political views also allowed for rapprochement with Chinese clergy formerly imprisoned during the Cultural Revolution. In 1985 Li Mingshu was allowed an official post teaching at the seminary of Jinan. In 1994 he was transferred to the service of the Diocese of Qingdao, and was appointed the Bishop of Qingdao in 2000. Upon his consecration as bishop, he took the name "Joseph".

== Description ==
=== Exterior and plan ===
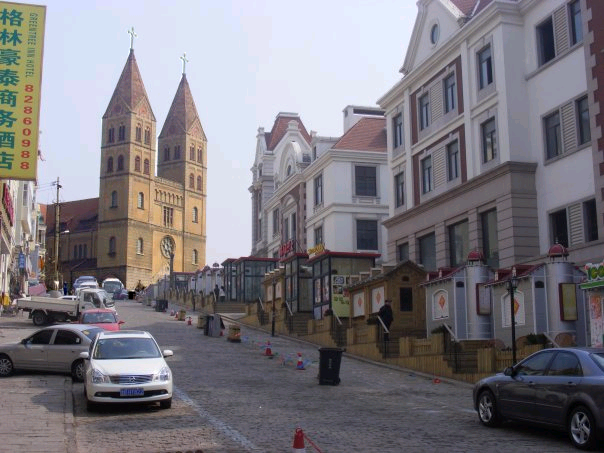
St. Michael's Cathedral, 2009, in its urban context

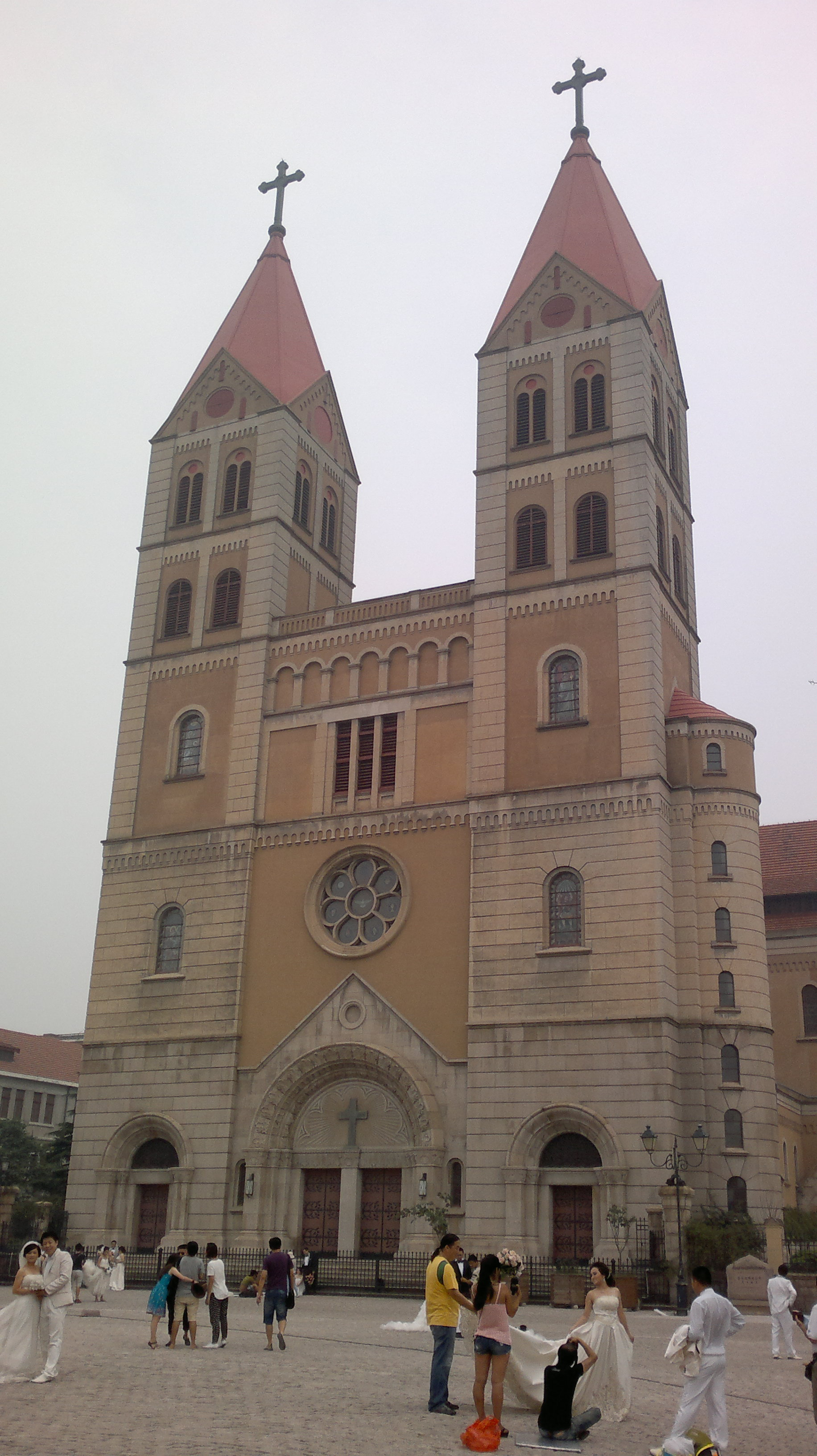
West façade, 2013

The cathedral stands atop a hill in the center of what was the original settlement of the city of Qingdao, at 15 Zhejiang Road (formerly Bremen Strasse) on the east side of Zhongshan Road (formerly Friedrich Strasse) in Shinan District. The church is built in the historic style of German Romanesque. It is cruciform in plan, having a nave flanked by a lower single aisle on either side, crossed by a transept, and with a semi-circular apse projecting at the east end.

The cathedral is 65.9 metres (216 ft) long and the transept is 37.6 metres (123 ft) wide, with an exterior height of 18 metres (59 ft). The towers are 56 metres (184 ft) in height, and have Rhenish helm spires, each topped by a 4.5-metre (15 ft) cross. One tower contains a single large bell, and the other three smaller bells.

The west front rises to a balustrade between the towers at 30 metres (98 ft). It has three portals, with a rose window above the central one. The building materials are reinforced concrete and granite, and the roofs are red tiles.

In his book, German Architecture in China, Warner Torsten writes of the cathedral:

According to residents] the cathedral is far too large for the scale of Qingdao. Its position on top of a hill makes this even more evident. Perhaps the idea was to produce a powerful building to hold its own with the Protestant Church, which for 20 years had been the largest religious building in Qingdao, or perhaps the intention was to outstrip the 46 metre-high towers of the Franciscan church in Jinan. The towers of the cathedral in Qingdao were higher than all the other churches in the major cities of Northern China – Tianjin, Beijing, Dalian, or Jinan. They dominate the silhouette of Qingdao; they are particularly impressive from a ship entering the harbour.

=== Interior ===
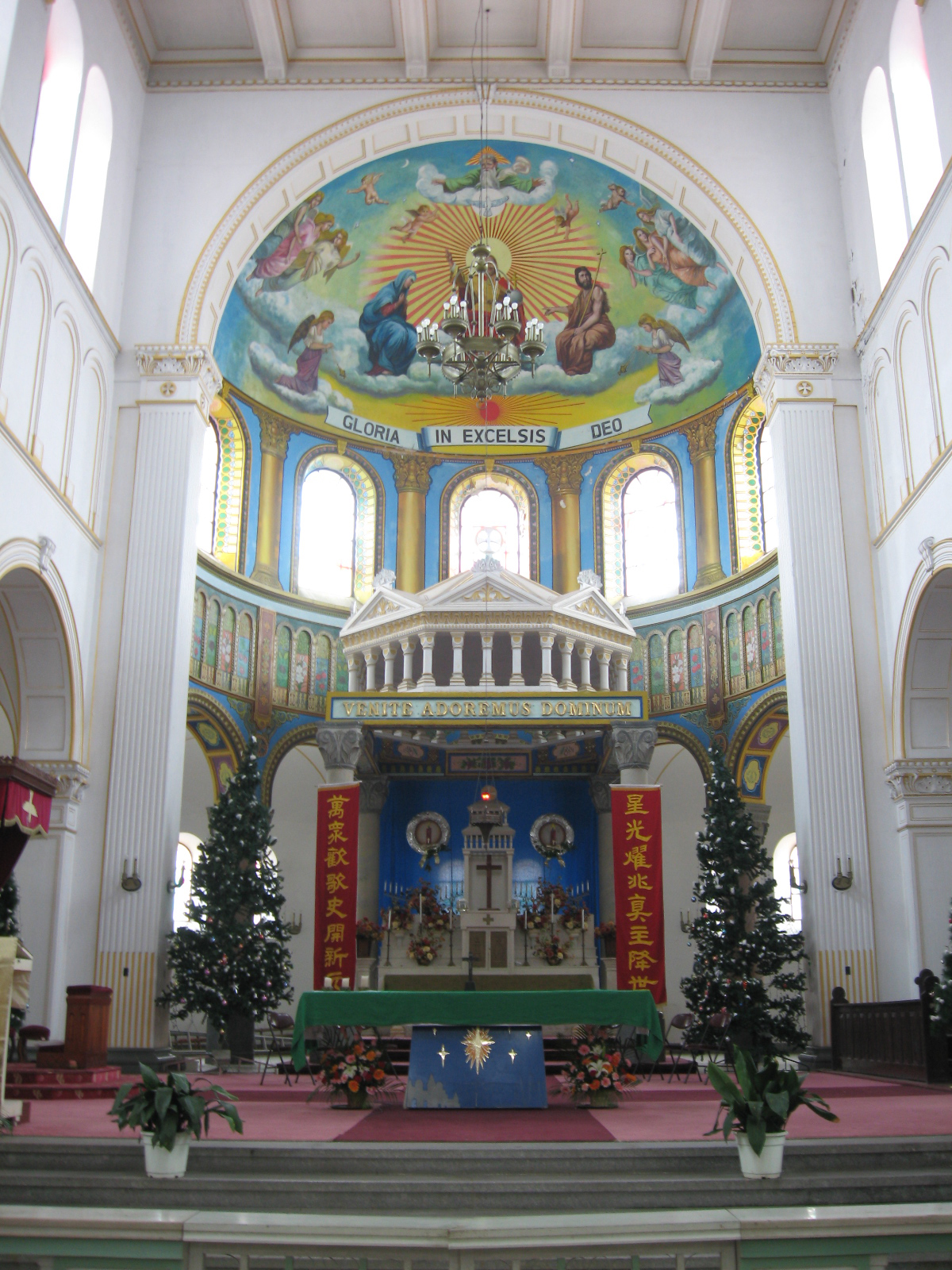
Sanctuary of St. Michael's Cathedral, decorated for Christmas

The total floor area of St. Michael's Cathedral is 2,740 square metres (29,500 sq ft). While the exterior of the cathedral is neo-Romanesque, the interior has piers and arches of a Classical revival style. Above the 12-metre (39 ft) high nave and transept is an unvaulted coffered ceiling. Narrow vaults over the two aisles are so much lower than the nave that they function like ambulatories. The nave can hold 1,000 people. The baptismal font and statues have captions in English and Chinese.

The nave extends into a high vaulted apse (pictured right) at the east end. The aisles on either side of the nave are continued around the apse, making an ambulatory. Seven chandeliers are suspended from the ceiling over the main aisle. Beneath the chancel arch stands the high altar, under an ornate baldachin. The ciborium over the high altar bears the Latin words Venite Adoremus Dominum, "Come adore the Lord." Within the sanctuary stands a second, portable, altar, upon which most masses are celebrated.

According to Lonely Planet, "The interior is splendid, with white walls, gold piping … and a marvellously painted apse."

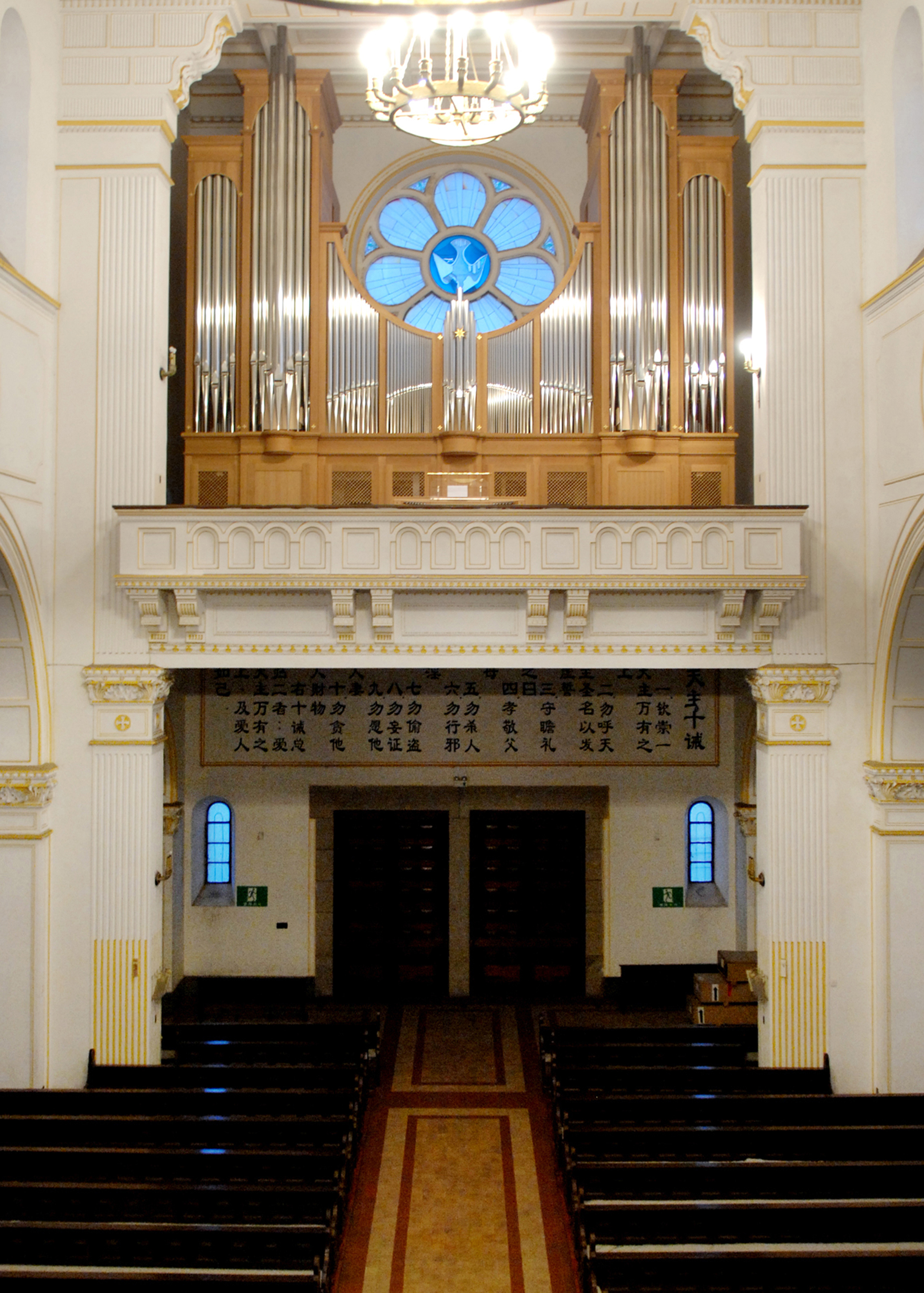
Interior, looking west, showing the Jäger & Brommer pipe organ

The mural painted on the dome of the apse (pictured right) depicts Jesus seated on a cloud, red and golden rays radiating out of his golden halo. God the Father, pictured as a white-bearded man with triangular halo, looks down from a cloud above Jesus. A dove with a white halo, representing the Holy Spirit, flies just below God, wings outstretched, completing the Trinity. Above Jesus fly four cherubim. Seated to Jesus' right is Mary, his mother, and to his left Saint John the Baptist. On the same cloud as Jesus, three angels flank on each side. Slightly below Jesus, Mary, and John, two more flanking angels are depicted kneeling on their own clouds and swinging censers. Under the entire scene, a banner displays Gloria in Excelsis Deo.

In 2006, the construction and installation of a massive 12-by-12-metre (39 ft × 39 ft) Jäger & Brommer pipe organ (pictured at left) was commissioned for St. Michael's Cathedral at a cost of 700,000 euros, to be ready in time for the 2008 Olympics. The pipe organ sits upon the choir loft over the west front entrance.

The north transept contains three large murals featuring Jesus Christ: Jesus washing St. Peter's feet, the Sacred Heart, and the Pietà. The north transept also contains the tombs of two bishops. One is of the first vicar apostolic of the Vicariate Apostolic of Qingdao, Bishop Georg Weig, SVD, who supervised the construction of the cathedral. Bishop Weig's tombstone shows obvious signs of defacement, being chipped around the edges, and with broken stonework at its base. The other tomb contains part of the ashes of Bishop of Qingdao Paul Han Xirang, OFM, the rest having been buried in his hometown, Han Village, Yucheng County, Shandong Province.

The south transept also contains three large murals: the Holy child praying, St. Thérèse of Lisieux (patroness of missions), and the Nativity. The north and south arms of the transept each contain two altars.

== Services ==
The church is active and as of 2008 more than 10,000 Catholics in Qingdao attend services there. According to December 2009 and January 2010 church bulletins, mass is celebrated daily by Bishop Li Mingshu at 6 am, with additional masses on Sunday and festivals on Easter and Christmas. Services are held in Korean and Chinese, with one Korean and several Chinese priests on site.

== Ordinaries ==
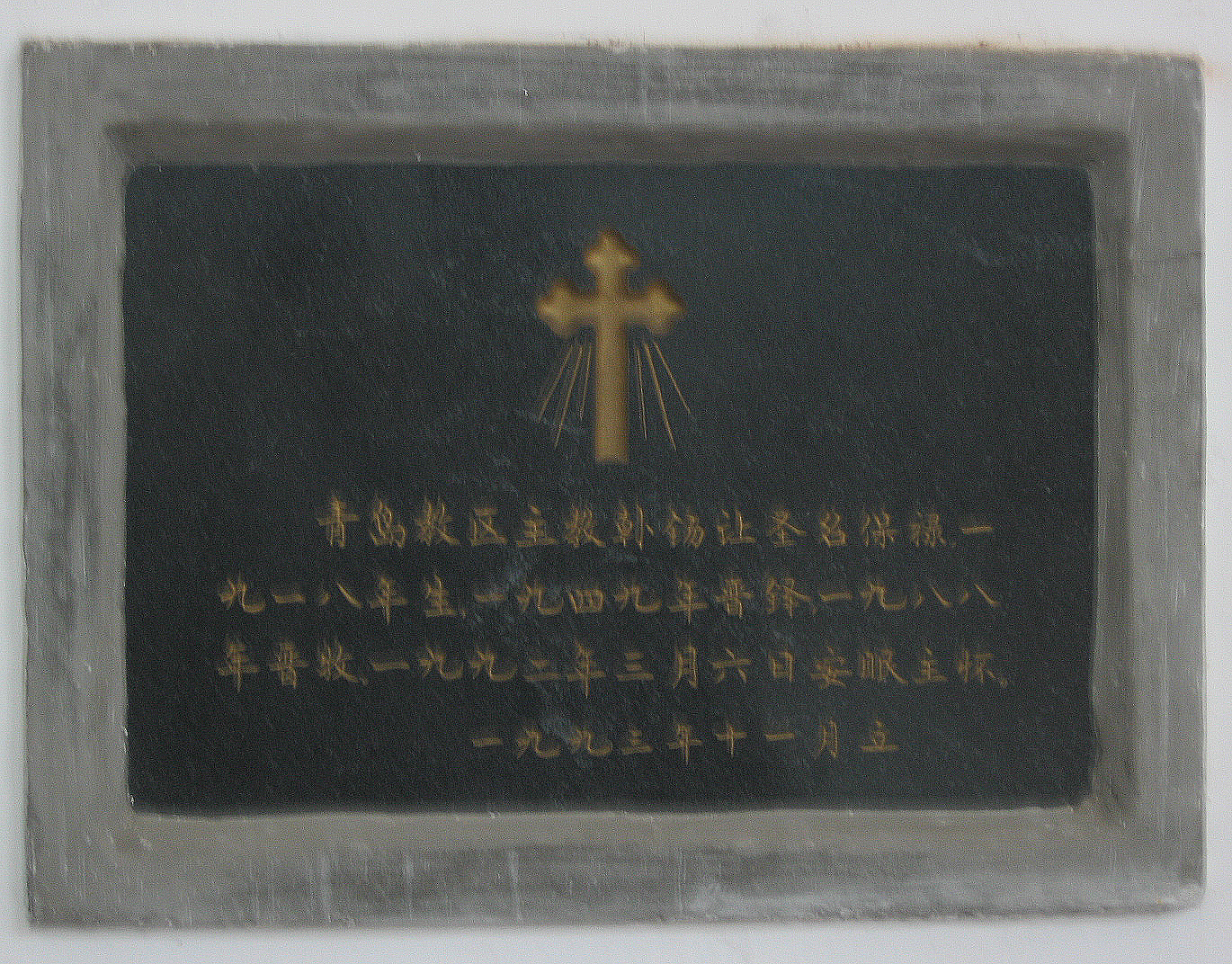
Bishop Paul Han Xirang's tombstone, set into a wall in the north transept

Below is a list of bishops who have reigned from St. Michael's Cathedral, since its consecration in 1934.

- Georg Weig, SVD † (Appointed 18 March 1925 – Died 3 October 1941)
- Thomas Tien Ken-sin (Tienchensing), SVD † (Appointed 10 November 1942 – 11 April 1946 Appointed Archbishop of Peking)
- Faustino M. Tissot, SX † (Appointed 1946 – Resigned 1947)
- Augustin Olbert, SVD † (Appointed 8 July 1948 – Arrested 1951, Imprisoned Until 1953, then deported to Germany. Died 18 November 1964)
- Paul Han Xirang, OFM † (Appointed 24 April 1988 – Died 6 March 1992) Note: Consecrated as bishop and appointed without papal mandate.
- Joseph Li Mingshu † (Appointed 13 August 2000 – Died 15 June 2018)
- Thomas Chen Tianhao (Appointed 23 November 2019)
