= Paul Han Xirang =

Chinese bishop

- Bishop of the Roman Catholic Diocese of Qingdao
- Church: St. Michael's Cathedral, Qingdao
- Archdiocese: Roman Catholic Archdiocese of Jinan
- Diocese: Roman Catholic Diocese of Qingdao
- Installed: 1988
- Term ended: 6 March 1992
- Predecessor: Augustin Olbert
- Successor: Joseph Li Mingshu

Orders
- Ordination: April 11, 1949

Personal details
- Born: August 1, 1918 China
- Died: March 6, 1992 (aged 73) China
- Denomination: Roman Catholic

Paul Han Xirang O.F.M. (simplified Chinese: 韩锡让; traditional Chinese: 韓錫讓; pinyin: Hán Xīràng; 1 August 1918 - 6 March 1992) was a Chinese Catholic priest and Bishop of the Roman Catholic Diocese of Qingdao between 1988 and 1992.

== Biography ==
Born into a Catholic family, Han began his junior seminary in Jinan, Shandong in the 1930s. In 1944, he became a Franciscan and was sent to the seminary of Hankou in Hebei for his theological studies. He was ordained a priest at the cathedral there on April 11, 1949. The same year, the Communists came to power in China. Han returned to Jinan and was appointed rector of a junior seminary. Later he also became parish priest. In 1958 he was imprisoned for counter-revolutionary activities because he had protested against three self-movements. He remained in prison until 1979. After his release, he began serving among the Catholics of Qingdao, and became parish priest of St. Michael's Cathedral when it reopened in 1981. On April 24, 1988, he was ordained Bishop of the Roman Catholic Diocese of Qingdao without papal mandate, by Bishop Joseph Zong Huaide of Jinan. Bishop Han was invited to a visit to Fu Jen Catholic University in Taiwan by Archbishop Stanislaus Lo Kuang, then president of Fu Jen Catholic University, on the occasion of the university's 60th anniversary in December 1989. But the Communist government forbade him to go to Taiwan. He died on March 6, 1992.

Catholic Church titles
Previous: Augustin Olbert	Bishop of the Roman Catholic Diocese of Qingdao; 1988–1992	Next: Joseph Li Mingshu
