= Wenjun =

Wenjun is a Chinese given name. People with this name include:

- Zhuo Wenjun (175–121 BC), Chinese poet of the Western Han dynasty
- Yu Wenjun (297–328), Chinese empress of the Jin dynasty
- Ni Wenjun (died 1537), rebel leader of the Red Turban Rebellions
- Wu Wenjun (1919–2017), Chinese mathematician and historian
- Li Wenjun (1930–2023), Chinese translator and writer
- Qin Wenjun (born 1954), Chinese author of children's literature
- Fu Wenjun (born 1955), Chinese artist
- Wenjun Zhang (born 1963), Chinese information engineer
- Wenjun Zeng (born 1960s), Chinese electronics engineer
- Antonio Sun Wenjun (born 1970), Chinese Roman Catholic prelate
- Yang Wenjun (born 1983), Chinese flatwater canoeist
- Guo Wenjun (born 1984), Chinese sport shooter
- Liu Wenjun (born 1985), Chinese Paralympian athlete
- Zhou Wenjun (athlete) (born 1986), Chinese Paralympian athlete
- Lü Wenjun (born 1989), Chinese footballer
- Xie Wenjun (born 1990), Chinese hurdler
- Jiang Wenjun (born 1990), Chinese footballer
- Ju Wenjun (born 1991), Chinese chess player
- Ren Wenjun (born 1992), Chinese sprint canoeist
- Bi Wenjun (born 1997), Chinese actor and singer
- Lin Wenjun (born 1997), Chinese sprinter
- Ge Wenjun (born 2000), Chinese footballer
