= Luigi Moccagatta =

Luigi Moccagatta O.F.M.
- Bishop of Roman Catholic Archdiocese of Taiyuan
- Church: Cathedral of the Immaculate Conception, Taiyuan
- Archdiocese: Roman Catholic Archdiocese of Taiyuan
- Installed: 1870
- Term ended: 1891
- Successor: Gregorio Grassi

Orders
- Ordination: 1832

Personal details
- Born: October 9, 1809 Castellazzo Bormida, Province of Alessandria, Italy
- Died: September 6, 1891 (aged 81) Taiyuan, Shanxi, Qing China
- Denomination: Roman Catholic

Chinese name
- Simplified Chinese: 江类思
- Traditional Chinese: 江類思
Transcriptions
Standard Mandarin
- Hanyu Pinyin: Jiāng Lèisī

Luigi Moccagatta (Chinese: 江类思; 9 October 1809 – 6 September 1891) was an Italian missionary and prelate of the Roman Catholic Church.

== Biography ==
Luigi Moccagatta was born in Castellazzo Bormida, Province of Alessandria, Italy, on 9 October 1809. He joined the Franciscans in 1826, at the age of 16. He was ordained a priest in 1832.

He became coadjutor bishop of the Roman Catholic Archdiocese of Jinan in 1844, and succeeded Bishop Lodovico Maria (dei Conti) Besi as bishop of the Roman Catholic Archdiocese of Jinan in 1848. He rebuilt the Cathedral of the Immaculate Conception, Taiyuan in 1870. On 27 September 1870, he became bishop of Roman Catholic Archdiocese of Taiyuan. Because of his old age and illness, his nephew Gregorio Grassi was appointed coadjutor bishop in 1876 to take charge of the administration of the archdiocese instead of him. He died of illness on 6 September 1891, aged 81.

Catholic Church titles
Preceded by Ludovico Maria Besi (dei Conti) Besi	Bishop of the Roman Catholic Archdiocese of Jinan; 1848–1870	Succeeded by Efrem Giesen
Unknown	Bishop of Roman Catholic Archdiocese of Taiyuan; 1870–1891	Succeeded by Gregorio Grassi
