= Diocese of Weifang =

Roman Catholic diocese in China

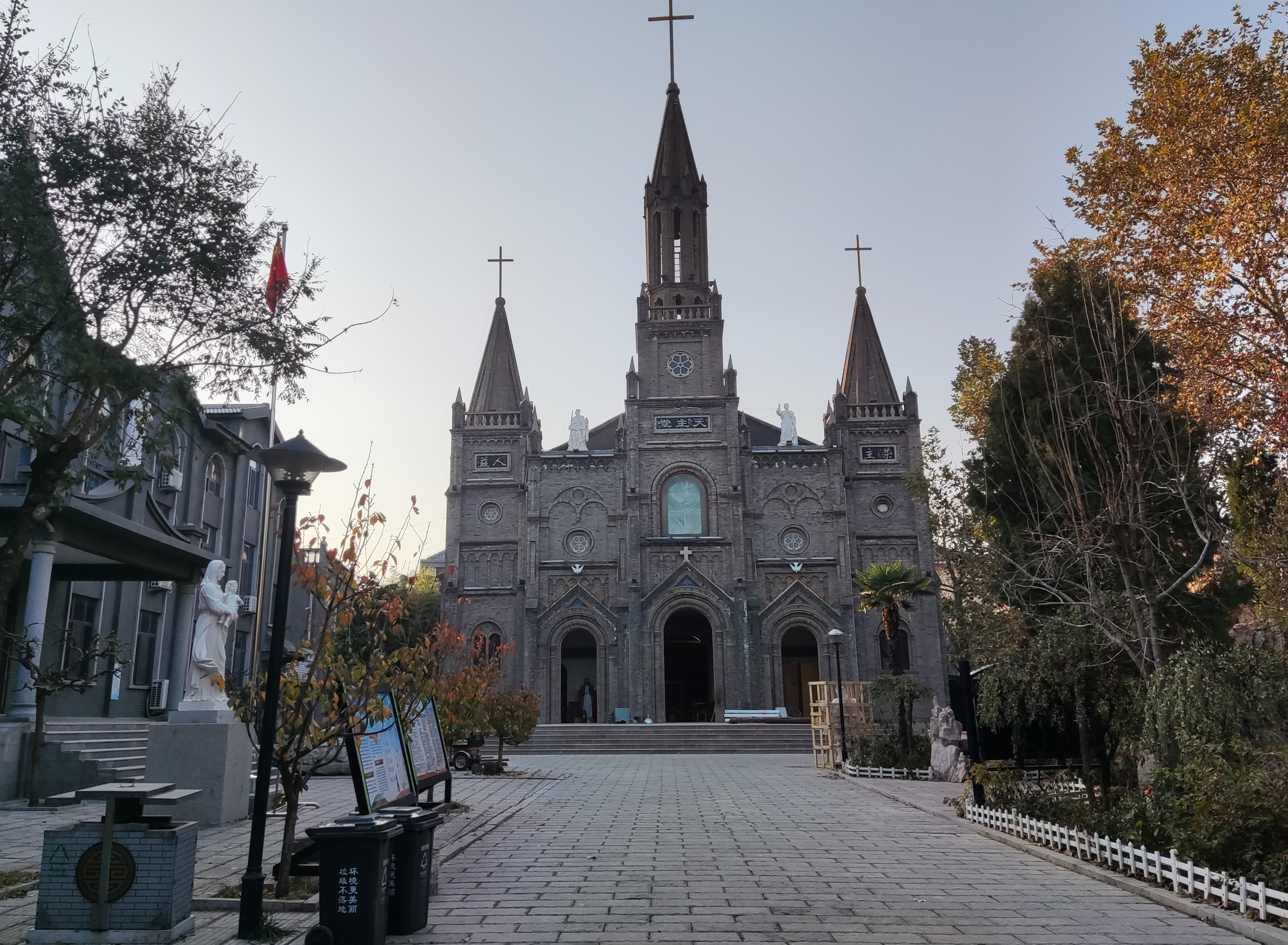

Location
- Country: China
- Ecclesiastical province: Jinan
- Metropolitan: Jinan

Statistics
- Area: 16,167 km^{2} (6,242 sq mi)
- Population: Total; Catholics: (as of 2024); 9.39 million; 6,000

Information
- Denomination: Roman Catholic
- Rite: Latin Rite
- Established: 20 April 2023
- Cathedral: Cathedral Church of Christ the King, Qingzhou, Weifang, Shandong
- Secular priests: 10

Current leadership
- Pope: Leo XIV
- Bishop: Anthony Sun Wenjun
- Metropolitan Archbishop: Joseph Zhang Xianwang

The Roman Catholic Diocese of Weifang is a Latin suffragan diocese in the ecclesiastical province of the Metropolitan of Jinan in China. Anthony Sun Venjun has been the Bishop of Weifang since 29 January 2024. The diocese replaced the Apostolic Prefecture of Yiduxian.
