= Thomas Chen Tianhao =

Chinese Roman Catholic bishop

Most Reverend Thomas Chen Tianhao
- Bishop of Qingdao
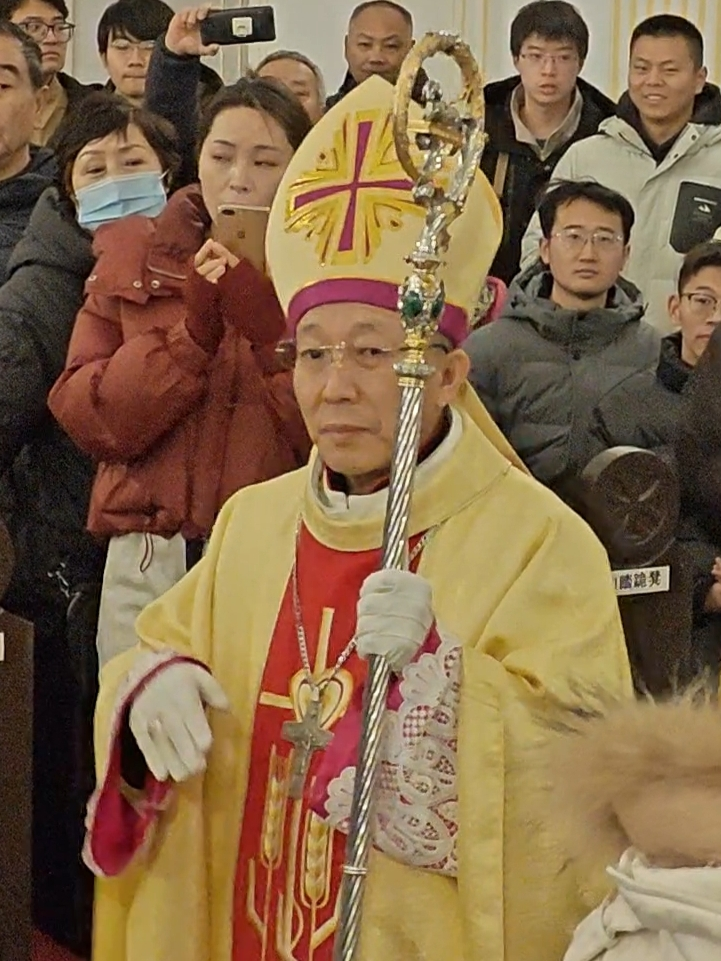
- Native name: 多默·陈天浩
- Archdiocese: Jinan
- Diocese: Qingdao
- Appointed: 19 November 2019
- Predecessor: Joseph Li Mingshu
- Successor: Incumbent

Orders
- Ordination: 17 December 1989
- Consecration: 23 November 2020 by John Fang Xingyao

Personal details
- Born: Thomas Chen Tianhao; 1962 (age 63–64) Pingdu, Shandong, China
- Denomination: Roman Catholic

Thomas Chen Tianhao is the current serving bishop of the Roman Catholic Diocese of Qingdao, China.

== Early life ==
Chen was born in Pingdu, Shandong, China in 1962.

== Priesthood ==
On 17 December 1989, Chen, was ordained as a priest. He completed his studies from the Holy Spirit seminary in Shandong.

== Episcopate ==
Chen was selected to be the bishop of the Roman Catholic Diocese of Qingdao on 19 November 2019 and ordained a bishop on 23 November 2020 at St. Michael's Cathedral in Qingdao by John Fang Xingyao.
