= Diocese of Qingdao =

Catholic jurisdiction in China

Diocese of Qingdao Dioecesis Zimtaovensis Bistum Tsingtao 天主教青岛教区
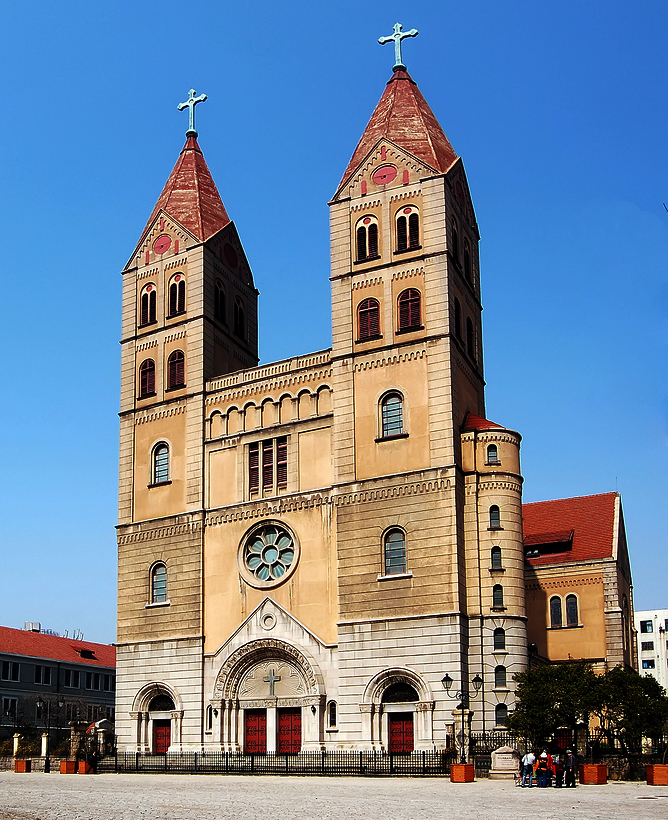
- St. Michael's Cathedral, Qingdao

Location
- Country: China
- Ecclesiastical province: Jinan

Statistics
- Area: 17,000 km^{2} (6,600 sq mi)

Information
- Denomination: Catholic Church
- Sui iuris church: Latin Church
- Rite: Roman Rite
- Cathedral: St. Michael's Cathedral, Qingdao

Current leadership
- Pope: Leo XIV
- Bishop: Thomas Chen Tianhao
- Metropolitan Archbishop: Joseph Zhang Xianwang

The Diocese of Qingdao/Tsingtao (Latin: Zimtaoven(sis), German: Bistum Tsingtao, simplified Chinese: 青岛; traditional Chinese: 青島; pinyin: Qīngdǎo) is a Latin Church ecclesiastical jurisdiction or diocese of the Catholic Church in China. It is a suffragan in the ecclesiastical province of the metropolitan Archdiocese of Jinan.

Its cathedral episcopal see is the Cathedral of St. Michael in the city of Qingdao, in Shandong.

== History ==
- Established on 11 February 1925 as Apostolic Prefecture of Qingdao (青島), on territory split off from the Apostolic Vicariate of Yanzhoufu (兖州府)
- On 14 June 1928 it was promoted as Apostolic Vicariate of Qingdao, remaining a pre-diocesan jurisdiction (exempt, i.e. directly subject to the Holy See), but now entitled to a [titular bishop].
- On 1 July 1937, it lost territory to establish the Apostolic Vicariate of Yizhoufu (沂州府)
- 11 April 1946: Promoted as Diocese of Qingdao.

== Ordinaries ==
Apostolic Prefects of Qingdao

- Georg Weig, Divine Word Missionaries (S.V.D.) (18 March 1925–14 June 1928 see below)

Apostolic Vicars of Qingdao

- Georg Weig, S.V.D. (see above 14 June 1928–1941), Titular Bishop of Antandrus (1928.06.14–1941.10.03)
- Thomas (Cardinal) Tien-ken-sin, S.V.D. (田耕莘) (10 November 1942–11 April 1946), Titular Bishop of Ruspæ (1939.07.11 –1946.02.18), previously Apostolic Prefect of Yanggu (陽穀) (China) (1934.02.23–1939.07.11), promoted Apostolic Vicar of Yanggu (1939.07.11–1942.11.10); later Cardinal-Priest of Santa Maria in Via (1946.02.22–1967.07.24), Metropolitan Archbishop of Beijing 北京) (China) (1946.04.11–1967.07.24) and Apostolic Administrator of Taipei 臺北) (Taiwan) (1959.12.16–1966.02.15)

Bishops of Qingdao

- Faustino M. Tissot, Xaverian Missionary Fathers (S.X.) (1946–1947), later Bishop of Zhengzhou (鄭州) (China) (1946.05.10–1983)
- Augustin Olbert, S.V.D. (8 July 1948–18 November 1964)
- uncanonical: Paul Han Xirang (韓錫讓), Friars Minor (O.F.M.), consecrated without papal mandate (1988–1992.03.06)
- Joseph Li Mingshu (August 2000–15 June 2018)
- Thomas Chen Tianhao (2020-)

== Source and External links ==
- GigaCatholic, with incumbent biography links
- Catholic Hierarchy
