= Diocese of Caozhou =

Roman Catholic diocese in China

Diocese of Caozhou Dioecesis Ceuziienensis 天主敎曹州敎區

Location
- Country: China
- Ecclesiastical province: Jinan
- Metropolitan: Jinan

Statistics
- Area: 13,000 km^{2} (5,000 sq mi)
- Population: Total; Catholics: (as of 1950); 4,000,000; 74,013 (1.9%)

Information
- Rite: Latin Rite
- Cathedral: Cathedral of Christ the King in Heze

Current leadership
- Pope: Leo XIV
- Bishop: Sede Vacante
- Metropolitan Archbishop: Joseph Zhang Xianwang

The Roman Catholic Diocese of Caozhou/Tsaochow/Heze (Latin: Zaoceuven(sis), Chinese: 曹州, 荷澤) is a diocese located in the city of Caozhou in the ecclesiastical province of Jinan in China.

== History ==
- November 12, 1934: Established as Apostolic Vicariate of Caozhoufu 曹州府 from the Apostolic Vicariate of Yanzhoufu 兖州府
- April 11, 1946: Promoted as Diocese of Caozhou 曹州 (中文)

== Leadership ==
- Bishops of Caozhou 曹州 (Roman rite)
  - Bishop Joseph Wang Dian-duo (1996 - July 27, 2004)
  - Bishop Francesco Hoowaarts, S.V.D. (April 11, 1946 – March 24, 1954)
- Vicars Apostolic of Caozhoufu 曹州府 (Roman Rite)
  - Bishop Francesco Hoowaarts, S.V.D. (November 12, 1934 – April 11, 1946)
