= Cyrillus Jarre =

German-born Chinese archbishop (1878–1952)

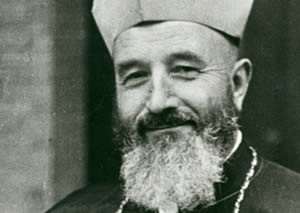
Cyrillus Jarre

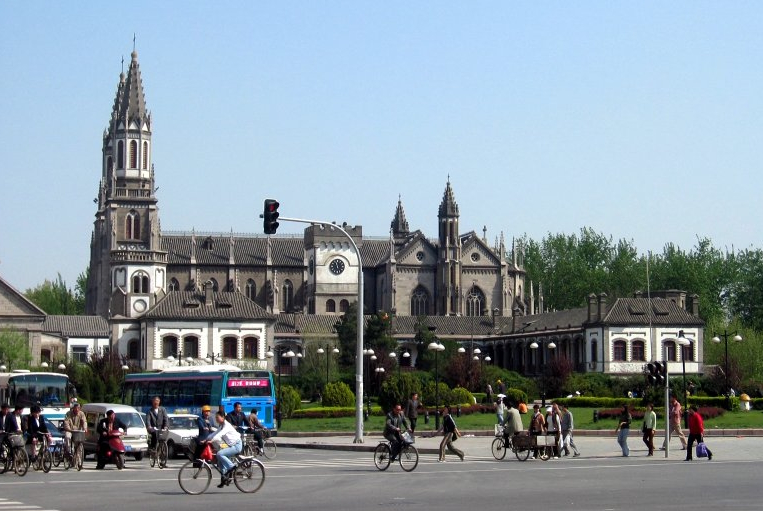
Sacred Heart Cathedral, Jinan

Cyrillus Jarre (born February 2, 1878, in Ahrweiler, Rhine Province, Germany as Rudolf Jarre, died March 8, 1952, in Jinan, Shandong, China, traditional Chinese: 楊恩賚; simplified Chinese: 杨恩赉; pinyin: Yáng Ēnlài; Wade–Giles: Yang Ên-lai, also known as Cirillo Rudolfus Jarre) was a Franciscan Archbishop in Jinan, Shandong Province, China and a translator of texts on canon law and Chinese law between Latin and Chinese.

Jarre got into conflict with the new communist rulers of China early on. He opposed the formation of state-sanctioned Christian churches in China (Three-Self Patriotic Movement) and supported the Legion of Mary, an association of Catholic laity that was viewed as reactionary organization by the communists. As a consequence, Jarre was arrested by the Chinese authorities on July 25, 1951, and from October 17, 1951, onwards he was imprisoned in Jinan.

Jarre was subjected to conditions of poor sanitation, nutrition, isolation, repeated interrogation, as well as other forms of abuse. He died on March 8, 1952, in the St. Josephs Hospital of Jinan. Members of his diocese buried Jarre's body wrapped in the red clothes of a martyr, but the authorities exhumed his body with the intent to rebury him in a black prisoner's uniform. In the end, a compromise was reached and Jarre's body was buried in white clothes. His grave is located in the Lin Jia Zhuang (Chinese: 林家庄村; pinyin: Línjiā Zhuāngcūn) Catholic cemetery to the southeast of Jinan.
