= Georg Weig =

German prelate (1883–1941)

The Most Reverend Georg Weig SVD
- Apostolate Vicar of Qingdao
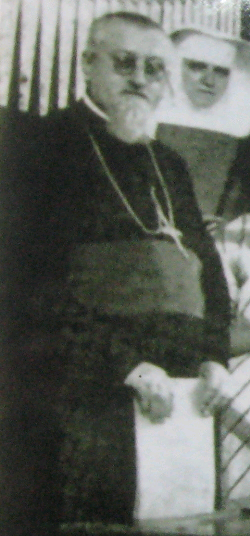
- Bishop Weig circa 1935
- Diocese: Vicariate Apostolic of Qingdao
- Installed: 15 June 1928
- Term ended: 3 October 1941
- Predecessor: None
- Successor: Thomas Tien Ken-sin
- Other post: Vicar Apostolic of Qingdao

Orders
- Ordination: 2 February 1907
- Consecration: 23 September 1926

Personal details
- Born: 14 December 1883 Beratzhausen, Imperial Germany
- Died: 3 October 1941 (aged 57) Qingdao, Republic of China
- Buried: St. Michael’s Cathedral, Qingdao, People’s Republic of China
- Denomination: Roman Catholic
- Residence: Qingdao, China

Georg Weig, SVD (Chinese name: Wei Changlu) (14 December 1883 – 3 October 1941) was a German prelate of the Roman Catholic Church. He served as Prefect of the Apostolic Prefecture of Qingdao (18 March 1925—20 June 1928) and Vicar Apostolic of the Apostolic Vicariate of Qingdao. Bishop Weig's Chinese name was Wei Changlu.

St. Michael's Cathedral was built and consecrated during Bishop Weig's reign, and he is entombed there. The inscription over his tomb is written in Latin and Chinese, and reads:

Hic

Dormit in Christo
Excellentia Dominus
Dr Georg Weig S.V.D. Primus Vicarius Apostolicus de Tsingtao.
Qui hanc ecclesiam a primis episcopatus sui annis miro animi vigore exstruendam navabat eamque S. Michaeli principi militiae caelestis dedicans die 28.X.1934 sollemniter consecravit.
Exstitit vigilans fidelium pastor animarium juventutis studiosae assiduus fautor. Missionariorum suorum dux prudens providusque pater.

Natus 14.XII.1883 Sacerdos ordinatus 10.II.1907. Episcopus consecratus 23.IX.1926 Piissime Obdormivit in Domino 3.X.1941 R.I.P

His tomb is damaged, having been defaced during the Cultural Revolution, and this is evident from the photo.

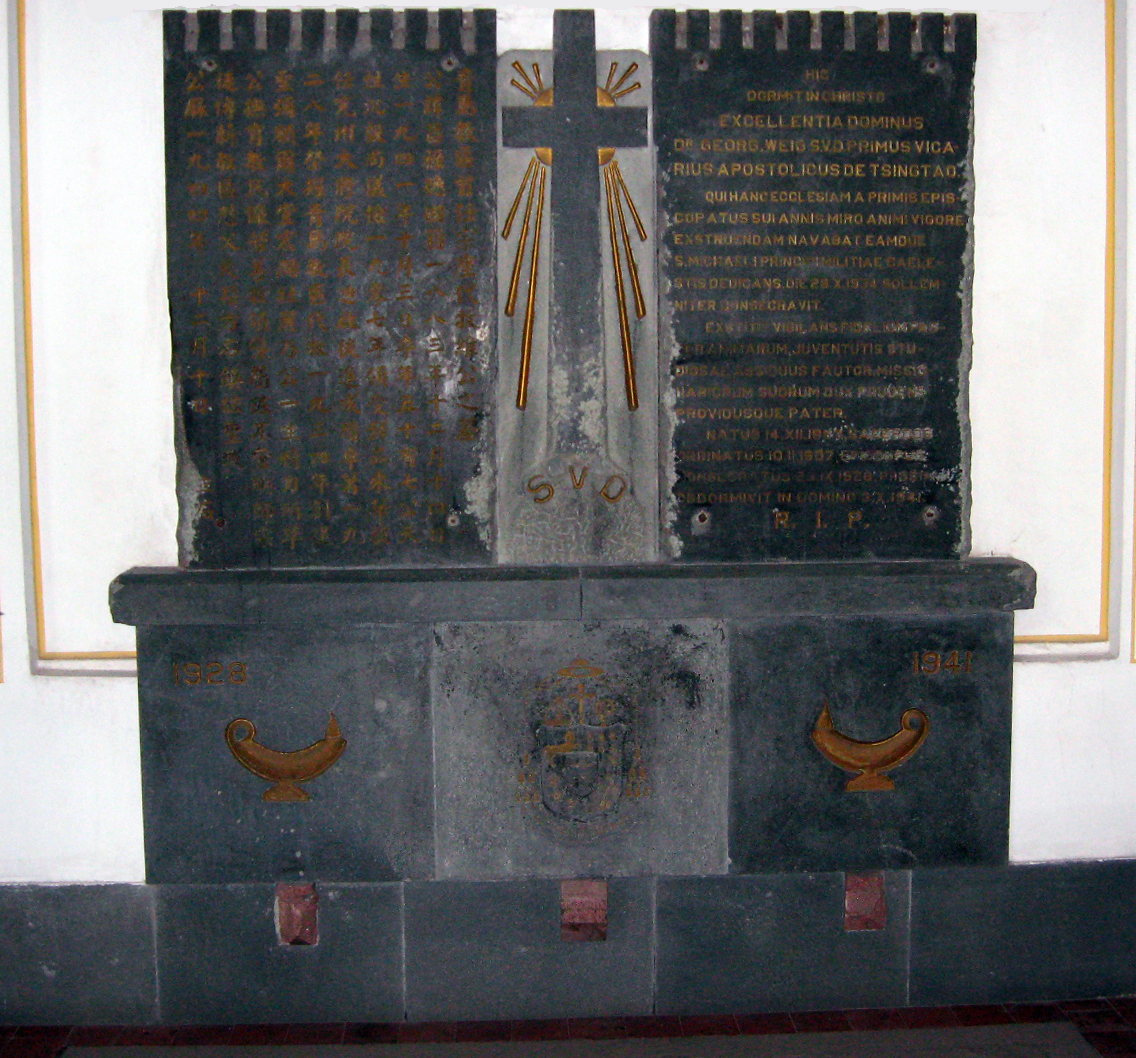

| Preceded by none | Apostolic Vicar of Qingdao; 1928–1941 | Succeeded by Thomas Tien-ken-sin |
