= Antonio Sun Wenjun =

Chinese catholic bishop

Most Reverend Antonio Sun Wenjun
- Bishop of Weifang
- Native name: 安东尼奥·孙文军
- Church: Catholic Church; Latin Church
- Diocese: Weifang
- Appointed: 20 April 2023
- Successor: Incumbent

Orders
- Ordination: 8 December 1995
- Consecration: 29 January 2024 by John Fang Xingyao

Personal details
- Born: Antonio Sun Wenjun; 1 November 1970 (age 55) Weifang, China

Bishop Antonio Sun Wenjun is a Chinese Roman Catholic prelate appointed as the first bishop of the newly created Roman Catholic Diocese of Weifang on 20 April 2023 by Pope Francis and the Chinese government.

== Early life ==
Antonio was born on 1 November 1970 in Weifang, China. He studied at the Sheshan seminary in Shanghai and was ordained a priest in 1995. He also studied in Ireland for sometime.

== Episcopate ==
On 20 April 2023, Antonio was appointed first bishop of the newly created Diocese of Weifang, China in accordance to Vatican-China agreement. He was ordained as a bishop on 29 January 2024 by John Fang Xingyao at Christ the King Church, Shenzhen.
