= Wenjun Zeng =

Wenjun Zeng, previously with the University of Missouri in Columbia, Missouri, was named Fellow of the Institute of Electrical and Electronics Engineers (IEEE) in 2012 "for contributions to multimedia communication and security".

== Education ==
- Ph.D., electrical engineering, Princeton University (1997).
- Master of Science, electrical engineering, University of Notre Dame (1993).
- Bachelor of Engineering, electronic engineering, Tsinghua University, Beijing, China (1990)
