= Joseph Zhang Xianwang =

Chinese bishop

- Metropolitan Archbishop of the Roman Catholic Archdiocese of Jinan
- Church: Sacred Heart Cathedral
- Province: Shandong
- Diocese: Roman Catholic Archdiocese of Jinan
- Installed: 2008
- Predecessor: James Zhao Ziping
- Other post: Coadjutor Bishop of Ji'nan (2004–2008)

Orders
- Ordination: December 8, 1990
- Consecration: April 29, 2004

Personal details
- Born: 张宪旺; January 12, 1965 (age 61) Huzhuang Village, Pingyin County, Shandong, China
- Denomination: Roman Catholic
- Education: KU Leuven

Chinese name
- Traditional Chinese: 張憲旺
- Simplified Chinese: 张宪旺
Transcriptions
Standard Mandarin
- Hanyu Pinyin: Zhāng Xiànwàng

Joseph Zhang Xianwang (Chinese: 张宪旺; born 12 January 1965) is a Chinese Catholic priest, Metropolitan Archbishop of Jinan since 2008.

== Biography ==
Zhang was born in Pingyin County, Shandong, on January 12, 1965. After high school, he entered the Shanghai Sheshan Monastery. In March 1997, he was accepted to KU Leuven, where he graduated in June 1998.

He was ordained a priest on December 8, 1990. On April 29, 2004, he became the Roman Catholic Coadjutor Bishop of Ji'nan. On May 18, 2008, after the death of Archbishop Zhao Ziping, he became Metropolitan Archbishop of Ji'nan.

Catholic Church titles
Previous: Zhao Ziping	Metropolitan Archbishop of the Roman Catholic Archdiocese of Jinan; 2008	Incumbent
