= Thomas Tien Ken-sin =

Chinese cardinal

His Eminence Thomas Tien Ken-hsin SVD
- Cardinal; Archbishop of Peking
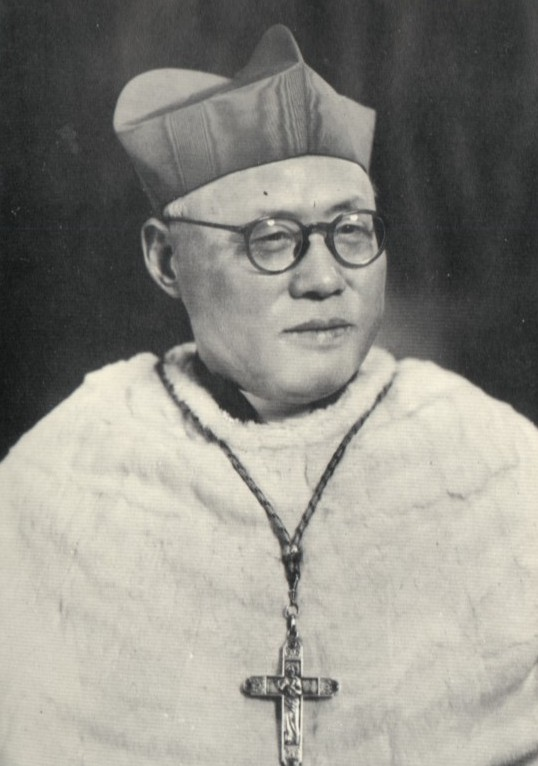
- Church: Catholic Church
- Archdiocese: Peking
- Province: Hopeh
- See: Beijing
- Installed: 1946
- Term ended: July 24, 1967
- Predecessor: Paul Léon Cornelius Montaigne
- Successor: Matthias Pei Shang-de
- Other post: Cardinal Priest of Santa Maria in Via
- Previous posts: Prefect of Yangku (1934–1939); Vicar Apostolic of Yangku (1939–1942); Vicar Apostolic of Qingdao (1942–1946); Bishop of Qingdao (1946); Titular Bishop of Ruspae (1939–1946)

Orders
- Ordination: June 9, 1918
- Consecration: October 29, 1939
- Created cardinal: February 18, 1946 by Pope Pius XII
- Rank: Cardinal priest

Personal details
- Born: October 24, 1890 Chantsui, Yanggu, Shandong Province, Qing China
- Died: July 24, 1967 (aged 76) Taipei, Taiwan
- Buried: St. Joseph the Wonder Worker Church (Cardinal Tien Memorial Church), Chiayi City
- Parents: Kilian Tien Ken-sin; Maria Yang
- Coat of arms

Styles of Thomas Tien Ken-sin
- Reference style: His Eminence
- Spoken style: Your Eminence
- Religious style: Cardinal
- Informal style: Cardinal

Thomas Tien Ken-sin SVD (Chinese: 田耕莘; pinyin: Tián Gēngxīn; October 24, 1890 – July 24, 1967) was a Chinese cardinal of the Catholic Church and chair of Fu Jen Catholic University. He served as archbishop of Peking from 1946 until his death, and was elevated to the cardinalate in 1946 by Pope Pius XII.

== Biography ==
Thomas Tien Ken-sin was born in Chantsui, Yanggu, (Shantung province) to Kilian Tien Ken-sin and his wife Maria Yang. Baptized in 1901, he studied at the seminary in Yenchowfu before being ordained to the priesthood by Bishop Augustin Henninghaus on June 9, 1918. Tien then did pastoral work in the Yangku Mission until 1939. He entered the Society of the Divine Word on March 8, 1929, in the Netherlands, taking his first vows on February 2, 1931, and his final ones on March 7, 1935. He was raised to Apostolic Prefect of Yangku on February 2, 1934.

On July 11, 1939, Tien was appointed apostolic vicar of Yangku and titular bishop of Ruspe. He received his episcopal consecration on the following October 29 from Pope Pius XII himself, with Archbishops Celso Constantini and Henri Streicher serving as co-consecrators. Tien was later made apostolic vicar of Qingdao on November 10, 1942.

He was elevated to cardinal priest of Santa Maria in Via by Pope Pius XII in the consistory of February 18, 1946. Tien, the first cardinal from China, was then named, on April 11 of that same year, the first archbishop of Beijing in post-Yuan dynasty China. In 1951, he was exiled from China by the Communist regime and spent this time in Illinois in the United States, to where he came that year for treatment of a heart ailment. He was one of the cardinal electors who participated in the 1958 papal conclave which selected Pope John XXIII, and was apostolic administrator of Taipei from December 16, 1959 to 1966. From 1962 to 1965, he attended the Second Vatican Council, and voted in the 1963 papal conclave, which selected Pope Paul VI.

Tien died in Taipei on July 24, 1967, at age 76. He is buried in the St. Joseph the Wonder Worker Church at Chiayi City.

== Influence ==
- He greatly promoted devotion to Our Lady of China.
- Tien was the first cardinal also from the Society of the Divine Word.
- The Holy See has not recognized any of CPA-approved successors of Tien as archbishop of Peking, though in his 2007 letter to the faithful in China, Pope Benedict XVI expressed an openness to dialogue with the CPA-appointed "bishops".

Catholic Church titles
| Preceded by Georg Weig | Vicar Apostolic of Qingdao; 1936–1946 | Elevated to diocese |
| New diocese | Bishop of Qingdao | Succeeded by Augustin Olbert |
| Preceded by Paul Léon Cornelius Montaigne | Archbishop of Beijing; 1946–1967 | Succeeded by Joseph Li Shan (recognized by the Holy See) |
| Preceded by Joseph Kuo Joshih (as archbishop) | Apostolic Administrator of Taipei; 1959–1966 | Succeeded by Stanislaus Lo Kuang (as archbishop) |
| Preceded by Patrick Joseph Hayes | Cardinal-Priest of Santa Maria in Via; 1946–1967 | Succeeded by Paul Yoshigoro Taguchi |
| Preceded by Joseph Louis Aldée Desmarais | — TITULAR — Bishop of Ruspae; 1939–1946 | Succeeded by J. Carroll McCormick |
