= Efrem Giesen =

Efrem Geisen (born 1868 in Amsterdam) was a Dutch clergyman and bishop for the Roman Catholic Archdiocese of Jinan. He was ordained in 1893. He was appointed bishop in 1902. He died in 1919.
