= Pingyin County =

Pingyin County 平阴县
- County
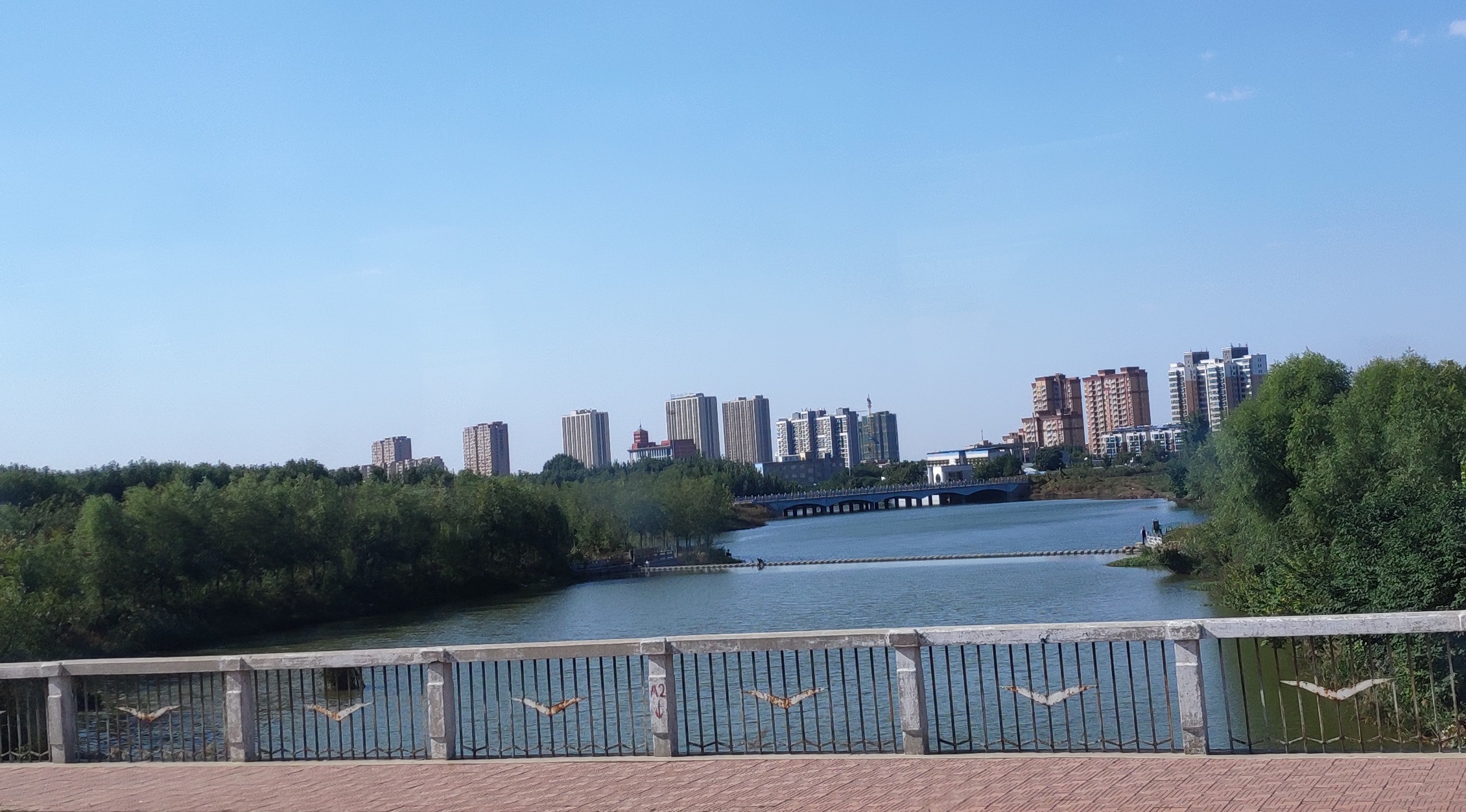

- Location in Shandong
- Coordinates: 36°17′13″N 116°27′40″E
- Country: People's Republic of China
- Province: Shandong
- Sub-provincial city: Jinan

Area
  - Total: 827 km^{2} (319 sq mi)

Population (2018)
  - Total: 374,900
  - Density: 453/km^{2} (1,170/sq mi)
- Time zone: UTC+8 (China Standard)
- Postal code: 250400
- Area code: +86 0531
- Website: pingyin.gov.cn

Pingyin County (simplified Chinese: 平阴县; traditional Chinese: 平陰縣; pinyin: Píngyīn Xiàn) is under the administration of Jinan, the capital of Shandong province, People's Republic of China. The ancient Kingdom of Jibei was located to the northeast of present-day Pingyin County.

Pingyin has an area of 827 square kilometers and a population of 360,000.

== Administrative divisions ==
As of 2020, this county is divided to 2 subdistricts and 6 towns.

Subdistrict

- Yushan Subdistrict (榆山街道)
- Jinshui Subdistrict (锦水街道)

Towns

- Dong'e (东阿镇)
- Xiaozhi (孝直镇)
- Kongcun (孔村镇)
- Hongfanchi (洪范池镇)
- Meigui (玫瑰镇)
- Ancheng (安城镇)

== Climate ==
Climate data for Pingyin, elevation 80 m (260 ft), (1991–2020 normals, extremes 1981–2010)
Month	Jan	Feb	Mar	Apr	May	Jun	Jul	Aug	Sep	Oct	Nov	Dec	Year
Record high °C (°F)	16.9 (62.4)	21.8 (71.2)	28.9 (84.0)	33.3 (91.9)	36.9 (98.4)	41.9 (107.4)	41.9 (107.4)	37.4 (99.3)	36.8 (98.2)	34.1 (93.4)	25.6 (78.1)	18.6 (65.5)	41.9 (107.4)
Mean daily maximum °C (°F)	4.0 (39.2)	7.7 (45.9)	15.0 (59.0)	21.0 (69.8)	27.1 (80.8)	31.6 (88.9)	32.0 (89.6)	30.3 (86.5)	26.7 (80.1)	21.2 (70.2)	12.4 (54.3)	5.7 (42.3)	19.6 (67.2)
Daily mean °C (°F)	−0.6 (30.9)	2.8 (37.0)	9.3 (48.7)	15.3 (59.5)	21.6 (70.9)	26.2 (79.2)	27.4 (81.3)	25.9 (78.6)	21.6 (70.9)	15.8 (60.4)	7.8 (46.0)	1.2 (34.2)	14.5 (58.1)
Mean daily minimum °C (°F)	−3.9 (25.0)	−0.9 (30.4)	4.7 (40.5)	10.2 (50.4)	16.6 (61.9)	21.2 (70.2)	23.6 (74.5)	22.6 (72.7)	17.8 (64.0)	11.6 (52.9)	4.4 (39.9)	−2.2 (28.0)	10.5 (50.9)
Record low °C (°F)	−20.3 (−4.5)	−14.8 (5.4)	−9.9 (14.2)	−4.1 (24.6)	3.5 (38.3)	10.9 (51.6)	17.5 (63.5)	13.5 (56.3)	6.1 (43.0)	−1.6 (29.1)	−13.7 (7.3)	−16.8 (1.8)	−20.3 (−4.5)
Average precipitation mm (inches)	4.4 (0.17)	9.6 (0.38)	11.1 (0.44)	31.3 (1.23)	58.7 (2.31)	77.5 (3.05)	175.3 (6.90)	155.1 (6.11)	51.0 (2.01)	28.5 (1.12)	23.0 (0.91)	7.2 (0.28)	632.7 (24.91)
Average precipitation days (≥ 0.1 mm)	2.1	3.4	3.1	5.1	6.5	8.0	10.8	11.1	6.8	5.0	4.4	2.6	68.9
Average snowy days	2.8	3.0	0.9	0.1	0	0	0	0	0	0	1.0	1.9	9.7
Average relative humidity (%)	59	55	51	55	59	58	75	79	71	64	64	62	63
Mean monthly sunshine hours	154.4	156.5	207.9	233.0	255.8	227.9	191.9	192.2	188.2	184.7	156.8	155.0	2,304.3
Percentage possible sunshine	50	51	56	59	58	52	43	46	51	54	52	52	52
Source: China Meteorological Administration

== Transportation ==
- China National Highway 220
