= Christ the King Church, Shenzhen =

Christ the King Church
- 深圳耶稣君王堂
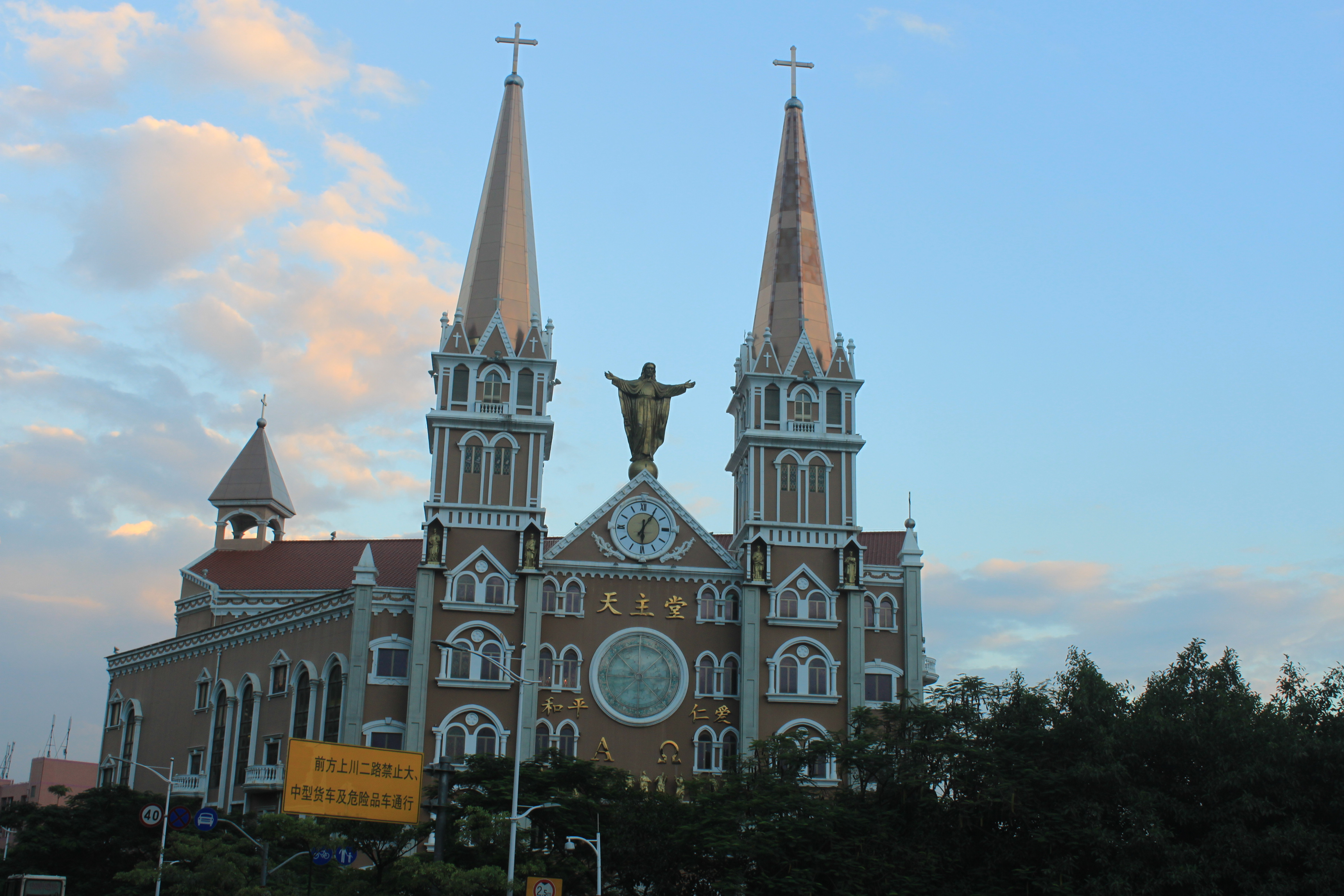
- Christ the King Church, Shenzhen.

- Location in Guangdong Christ the King Church (China)
- 22°35′25″N 113°55′02″E
- Location: Bao'an District, Shenzhen, Guangdong
- Country: China
- Denomination: Roman Catholic

History
- Status: Parish church
- Founded: November 2010

Architecture
- Functional status: Active
- Architectural type: Church building
- Style: Imitation Gothic architecture style
- Years built: 2010

Specifications
- Height: 64 metres (210 ft)
- Materials: Bricks

Administration
- Province: Guangdong
- Archdiocese: Shenzhen
- Diocese: Shenzhen

Christ the King Church (simplified Chinese: 深圳耶稣君王堂; traditional Chinese: 深圳耶穌君王堂; pinyin: Shēnzhèn Yēsū Jūnwāngtáng) is a Roman Catholic Parish church in Bao'an District, Shenzhen, Guangdong, China. It was founded and built in November 2010.

== History ==
Christ the King Church was founded and built in November 2010.

== Architecture ==
The church covers an area of 2,735 km^{2} (1,056 sq mi) and 64 metres (210 ft) in height of the imitation Gothic architecture style. There is a statue of Jesus at the top of the church, and he opened his arms as if to welcome the believers.

== Parish ==
The church has three Sunday Masses (主日弥撒). One is at 8:00pm on Saturday evening, at 9:00am Sunday morning and 3:00pm on Sunday afternoon. There are weekday Masses (平日弥撒) at 7:00am from Monday to Saturday.

== Transportation ==
- Take subway Line 5 (Huanzhong Line) to get off at Xingdong Station. Getting out from Exit C and walk 1.2 km (0.75 mi) to reach the church.
