= Sacred Heart Cathedral (Jinan) =

Catholic cathedral in Jinan, Shandong Province, China

Sacred Heart Cathedral 耶稣圣心主教座堂
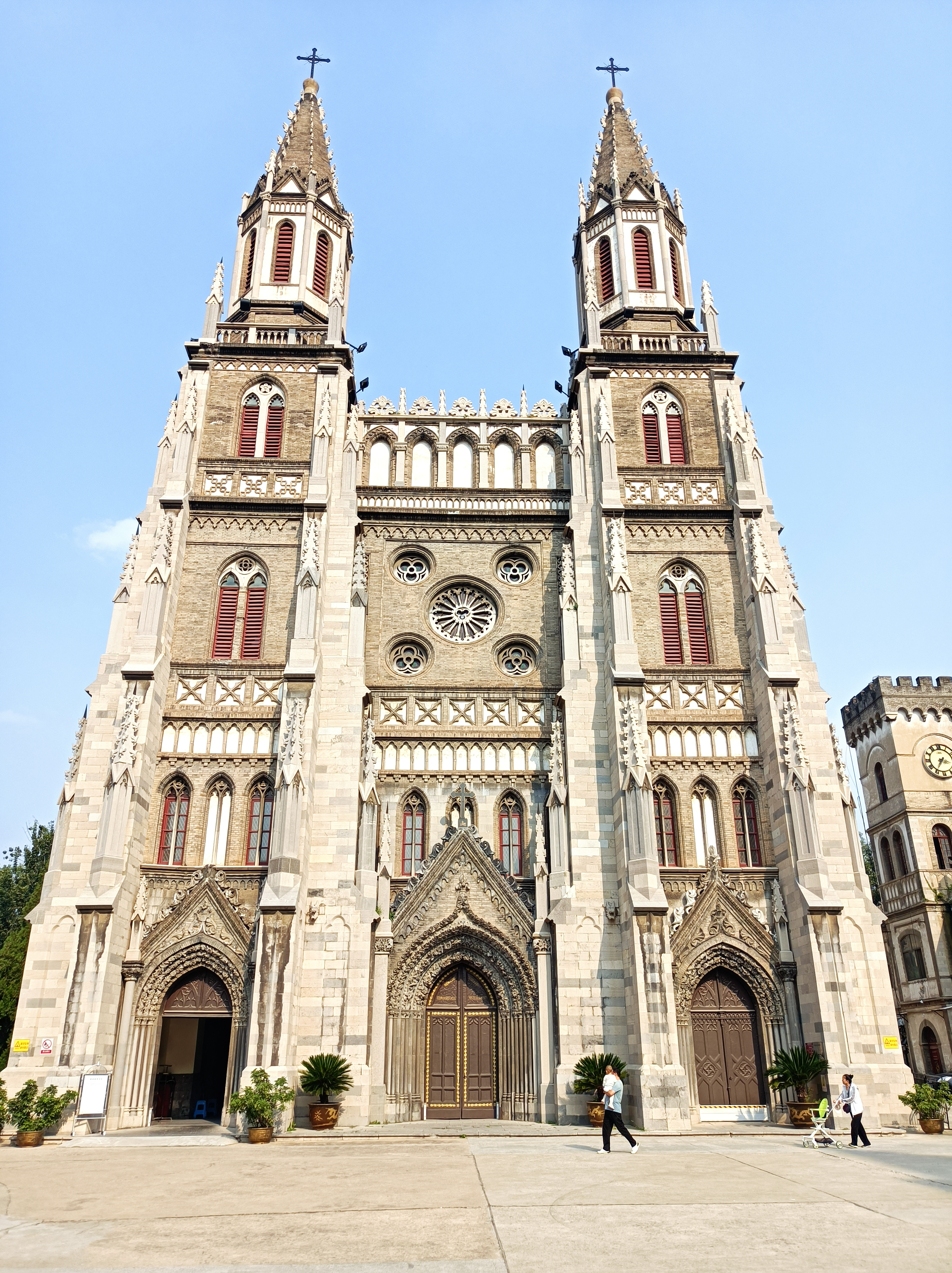
- Front of the cathedral

Religion
- Affiliation: Roman Catholic
- Diocese: Archdiocese of Jinan
- Province: Shandong
- Ecclesiastical or organisational status: Cathedral

Location
- Location: Jinan, China
- Interactive map of Sacred Heart Cathedral 耶稣圣心主教座堂
- Coordinates: 36°41′8.79″N 117°3′34.38″E

Architecture
- Architect: Korbinian Paugger (庞会襄)
- Type: Church
- Style: Gothic Revival
- Groundbreaking: 1901
- Completed: 1905
- Capacity: 800 people

The Sacred Heart Cathedral (Chinese: 洪家楼耶稣圣心主教座堂; pinyin: Hóngjiālóu Yēsū Shèngxīn Zhǔjiào Zuòtáng), commonly called the Hongjialou Cathedral, is the cathedral of the Roman Catholic Archdiocese of Jinan in the city of Jinan, the capital of Shandong Province, China. It is the largest church in the region and a landmark of Jinan.

The cathedral was constructed during the years 1901 to 1905 (and extended again in 1906). The building project was financed with funds from the indemnity that was stipulated by the Boxer Protocol. The basic layout of this Gothic Revival church is a Latin cross with two tall towers. It is reminiscent of Notre Dame de Paris. The main building of the church covers 1650 square meters and can accommodate about 800 people. The architect was the Franciscan brother Korbinian Paugger (庞会襄, born in Bolzano, died in Brixen in 1949 aged 94). The builder was the mason Lu Licheng (卢立成) from Suncun (孙村), a village in the Jinan area, who supervised nearly 1000 stonemasons for the construction project.

The cathedral was closed in 1966 due to the Cultural Revolution, its interior furnishings were dismantled. It was reopened again on Christmas Day 1985. In 1992, it was declared a heritage site of Shandong Province.

The cathedral is located between Hongjialou Square and the Hongjialou Campus of Shandong University. The cathedral compound also houses Holy Spirit Seminary (Shengshen Beixiu Yuan, founded in December 1998).

== Gallery ==
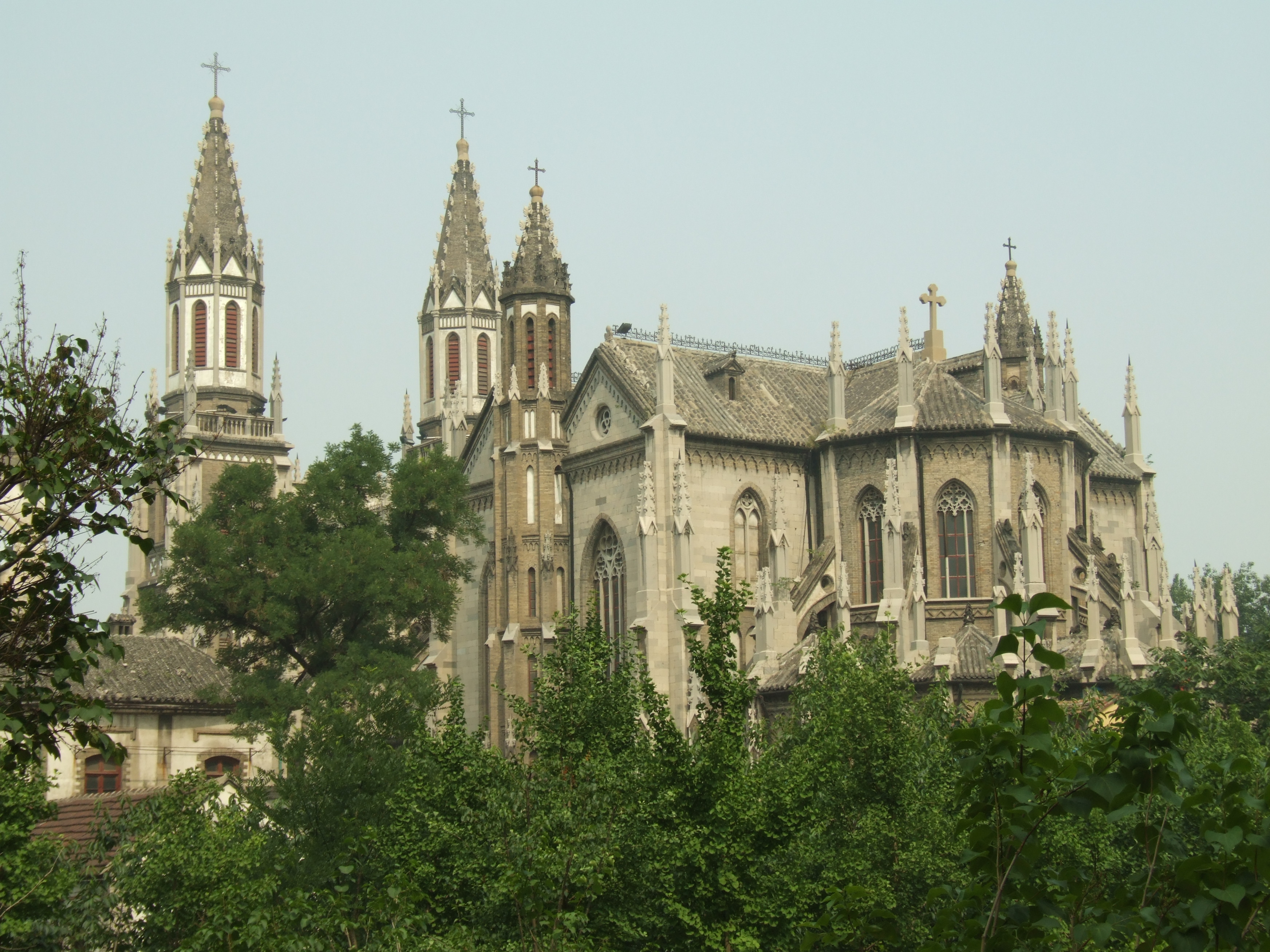
View from the campus of Shandong University

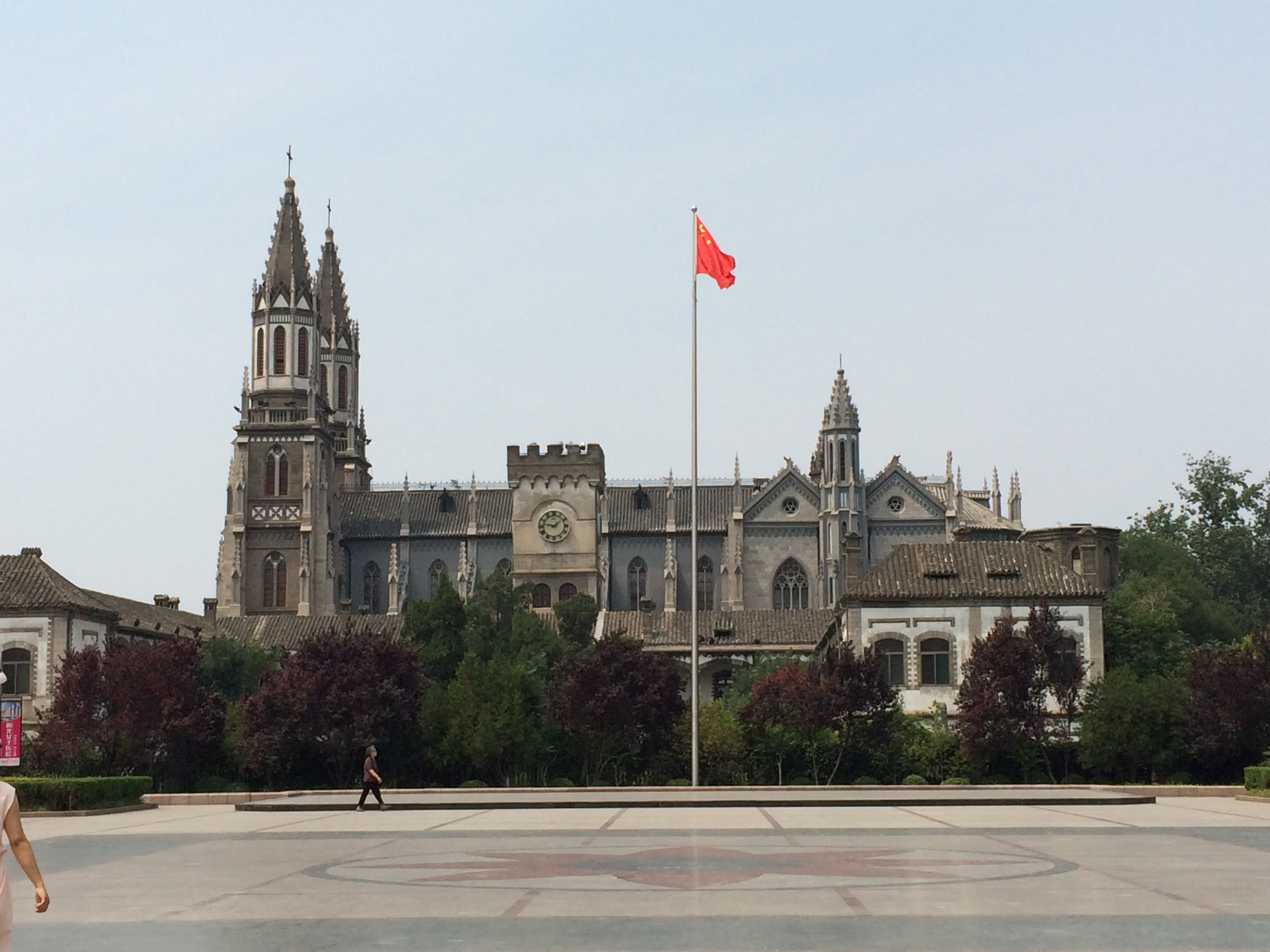
A sculpture of Jesus in front of the cathedral

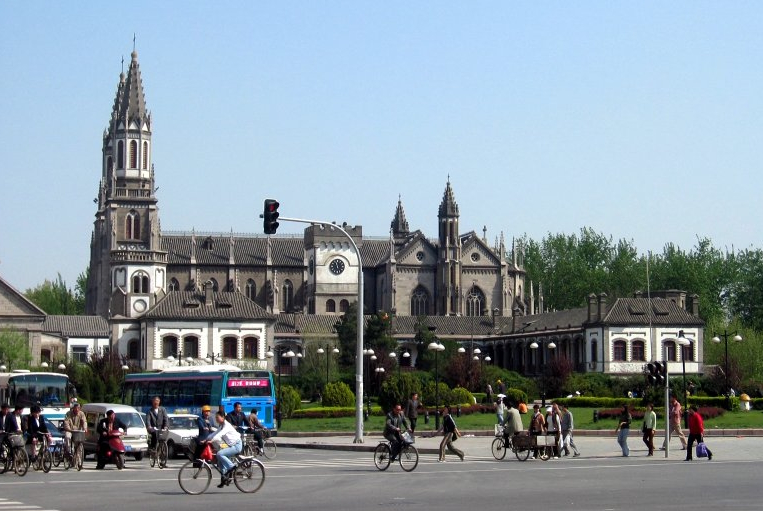
View from Hongjialou Square

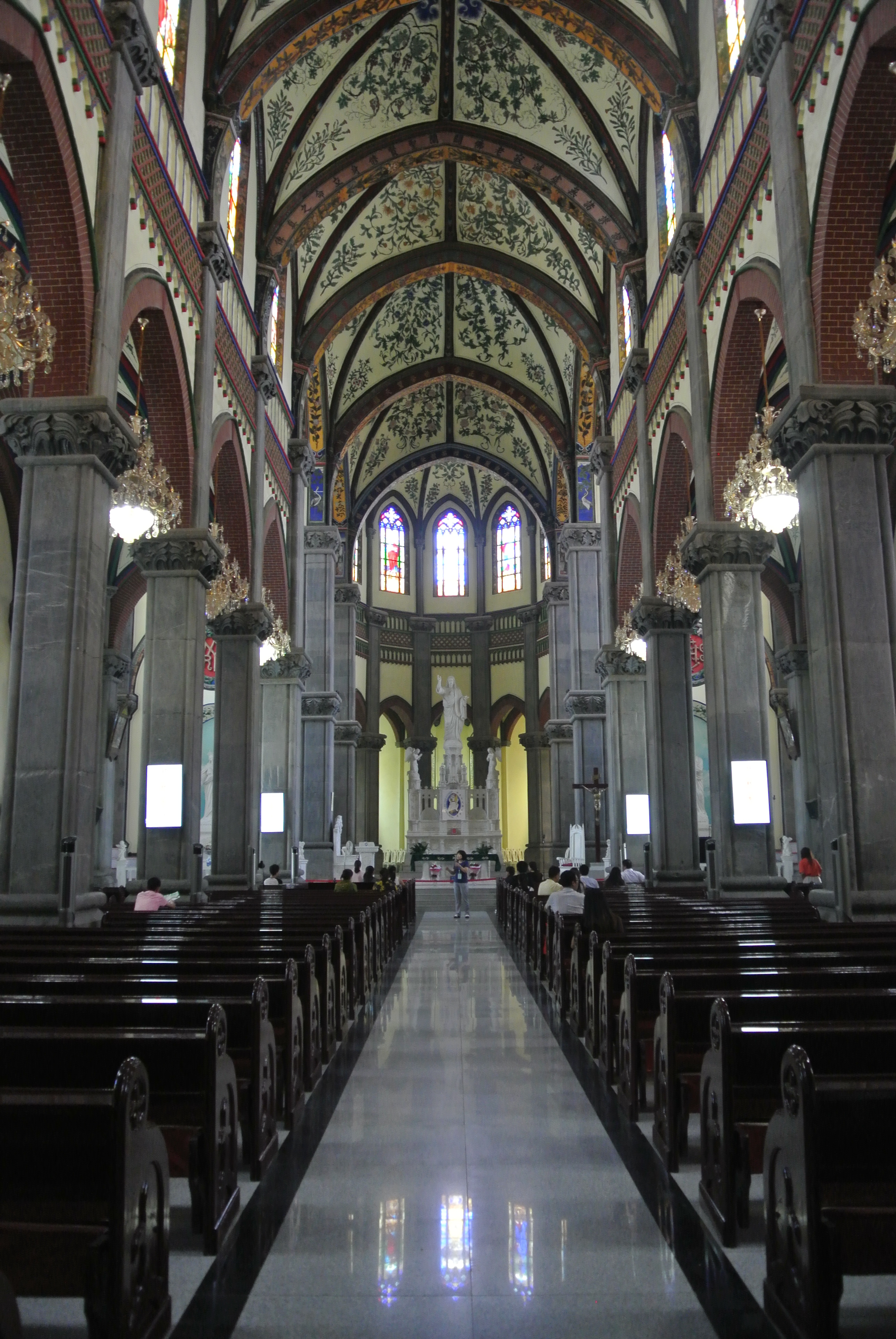
Interior, featuring the nave and apse

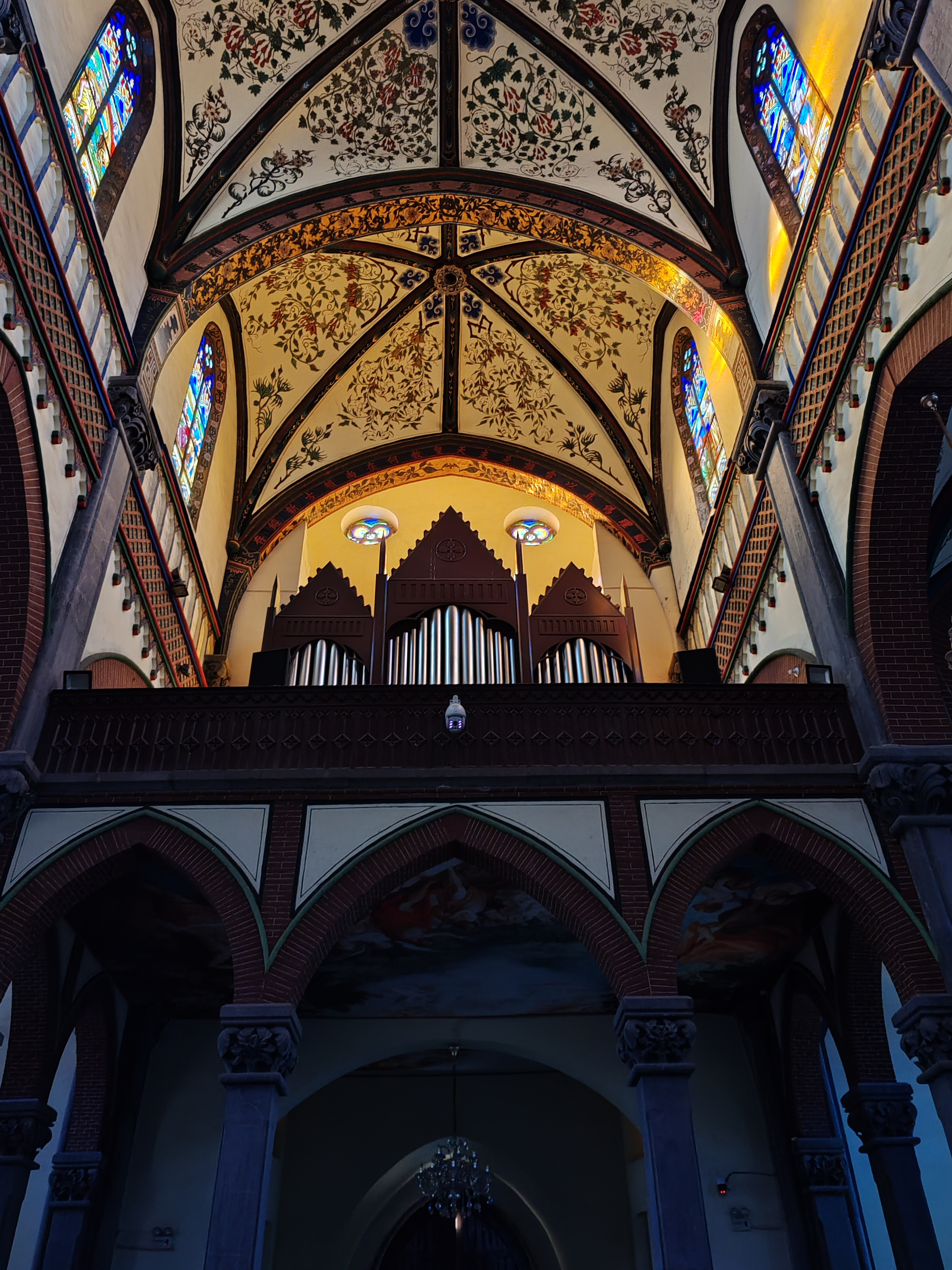
Organ

== See also ==
- List of sites in Jinan
