= Archdiocese of Jinan =

Roman Catholic archdiocese in China

Coordinates: 36.6667°N 116.9830°E

Archdiocese of Jinan Archidioecesis Zinanensis 天主教济南总教区
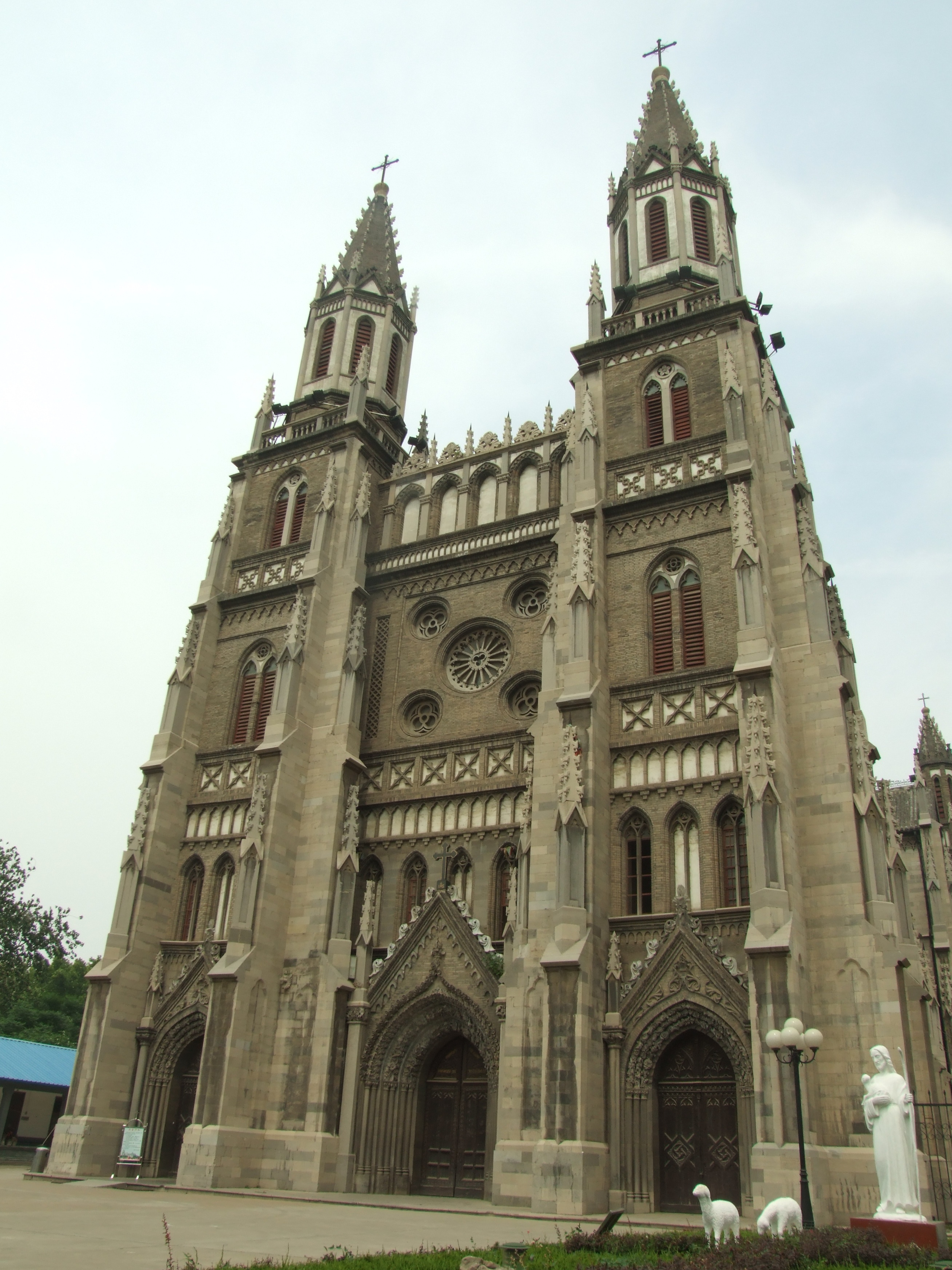
- Sacred Heart Cathedral (Jinan)

Location
- Country: China
- Ecclesiastical province: Shantung

Statistics
- Area: 25,000 km^{2} (9,700 sq mi)
- Population: Total; Catholics: (as of 1950); 5,000,000; 44,016 (0.9%)

Information
- Rite: Latin Rite
- Cathedral: Sacred Heart Cathedral (Jinan)

Current leadership
- Pope: Leo XIV
- Metropolitan Archbishop: Joseph Zhang Xianwang

The Roman Catholic Archdiocese of Jinan (Latin: Zinanen(sis), Chinese: 濟南) is an archdiocese located in the city of Jinan (Shandong) in China.

== History ==
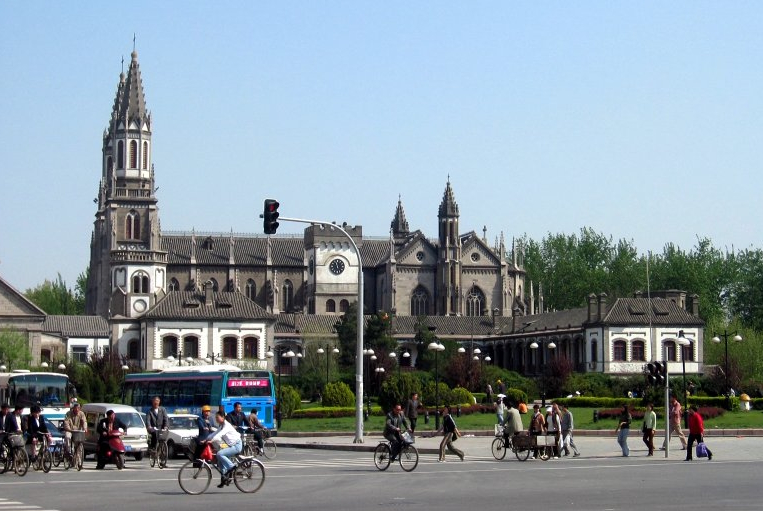
Sacred Heart Cathedral Jinan (in 2005)

- September 3, 1839: Established as Apostolic Vicariate of Shantung from the Diocese of Beijing
- December 2, 1885: Renamed as Apostolic Vicariate of Northern Shantung
- December 3, 1924: Renamed as Apostolic Vicariate of Tsinanfu
- April 11, 1946: Promoted as Metropolitan Archdiocese of Jinan

== Leadership ==
- Vicars Apostolic of Scian-Ton (Shantung 山東) (Roman Rite)
  - Bishop Ludovico Maria Besi (dei Conti) Besi (10 Jan 1840 Appointed - 3 Jun 1848)
  - Bishop Luigi Moccagatta, O.F.M. (1844 – September 27, 1870)
- Vicars Apostolic of Northern Shantung 山東北境 (Roman Rite)
  - Bishop Efrem Giesen, O.F.M. (申永福) (July 18, 1902 – 1919)
  - Bishop Adalberto Schmücker, O.F.M. (瑞明軒) (August 2, 1920 – December 3, 1924)
- Vicars Apostolic of Tsinanfu 濟南府 (Roman Rite)
  - Bishop Adalberto Schmücker, O.F.M. (瑞明軒) (December 3, 1924 – 1927)
  - Bishop Cyrillus Jarre, O.F.M. (杨恩赉) (later Archbishop) (May 18, 1929 – April 11, 1946)
- Archbishops of Jinan 濟南 (Roman rite)
  - Archbishop Cyrillus Jarre, O.F.M. (杨恩赉) (April 11, 1946 – March 8, 1952)
  - Fr. John P’ing Ta-kuam, O.F.M. (Apostolic Administrator November 7, 1952 – 1984)
  - Archbishop James Zhao Zi-ping (1997 - May 18, 2008)
  - Archbishop Joseph Zhang Xianwang (2008–present)

== Suffragan dioceses ==
- Caozhou 曹州
- Qingdao 青島
- Weifang
- Yanggu 陽穀
- Yantai 煙台
- Yanzhou 兖州
- Yizhou 沂州
- Zhoucun 周村
