= Joseph Li Mingshu =

Chinese Roman Catholic bishop

- Bishop of Qingdao
- Native name: 李明述
- Church: Catholic Church
- Diocese: Diocese of Qingdao
- In office: 13 August 2000 – 15 June 2018
- Predecessor: Paul Han Xi-rang
- Successor: Thomas Chen Tianhao

Orders
- Ordination: 11 April 1949
- Consecration: 13 August 2000 by Joseph Ma Xue-sheng

Personal details
- Born: 1 December 1924 Lijia, Shandong, Republic of China
- Died: 15 June 2018 (aged 93)

Joseph Li Mingshu (Chinese: 李明述; 1 December 1924 – 15 June 2018) was a Chinese clandestine Catholic bishop.

Bishop Li was born in village Lijia, Shandong in a Catholic family on 1 December 1924. He joined the theological seminary after a school and a minor seminary education and was ordained a priest on 11 April 1949. He worked as a teacher in the schools and theologian seminaries. From 1994 he served as an Administrator of the Roman Catholic Diocese of Qingdao and later was clandestinely consecrated as a diocesan bishop of the same diocese on 13 August 2000. He served as bishop here until his death. Bishop Li was recognised by the Chinese government but never joined the Chinese Patriotic Catholic Association.
