= Varešanin =

Varešanin is a South Slavic surname. The term is a demonym of Vareš, a town in central Bosnia.

Notable people with the name include:

- Marijan Varešanin (1847–1917), Croatian nobleman and general in Habsburg service
- Grgo Varešanin (1736–1813), Bosnian Franciscan friar
