= Huiqing =

Huiqing could refer to:

- Lin Huiqing (Chinese: 林慧卿; born 1941), Chinese table tennis player
- Lin Huiqing (politician) (Chinese: 林蕙青), Chinese politician
- Liu Huiqing (Chinese: 劉慧卿), Hong Kong politician
- Thomas Niu Huiqing (Chinese: 牛会卿; 1895–1973), Chinese Catholic priest
- Yan Huiqing (Chinese: 顏惠慶), politician in the Qing Dynasty, the Republic of China, and the People's Republic of China
