= Sufes =

Roman town in Tunisia

- Location within Tunisia
- 35.546667°N 9.073611°E
- Location: Tunisia
- Region: Kasserine Governorate

Sufes was a town in the late Roman province of Byzacena, which became a Christian bishopric that is included in the Catholic Church's list of titular sees.

== The town ==
The ruins of Roman Sufes are found near Sbiba a village in Tunisia's province of Kasserine. It was a small town from which Roman roads branched out to neighboring towns. (Note: Sufes is listed in the itinerary of stops for 5 routes in the Antonine Itinerary: Aquae Regiae → Sufes; Assuras → Thugga Terebenthina → Sufes → Sufetula → Nara → Madarsuma → Septiminicia → Tabalta → Macomades Minores → Thaenae; Tuburbo → Vallis → Coreva → Musti → Assuras → Thugga Terebenthina → Sufes → Sufetula → Nara → Madarsuma → Septiminicia → Tabalta → Cellae Picentinae Vicus → Tacape; Carthago → Inuca → Vallis → Coreva → Musti → Assuras → Thugga Terebenthina → Sufes → Sufetula; Sufes → Marazanis → Aquae Regiae → Vicus Augusti → Hadrumetum. It is not shown on the Tabula Peutingeriana.) It was on several hills sloped towards the plain, and covered a portion of the plain itself with a perimeter of about 6 km (3.7 mi).

There are few surviving records of Sufes. It is mentioned in the Antonine Itinerary as twenty five miles from Tucca Terebintha, and Victor Guérin discovered an inscription at the Sufes site, which described it as "splendissimus et felicissimus ordo Coloniae Sufetanae" and showed further on that Hercules was the genius loci, a type of tutelary deity, of Sufes.

It is not known when Sufes was founded, but it was known as a castellum in the history of Roman-era Tunisia during the early Empire, and probably became a colonia about the time of Marcus Aurelius, who reigned between 161 and 180, as its name colonia Aurelia Sufetana indicates. It had been a bishopric since at least AD 255 but the majority of its inhabitants were still pagan. In AD 411, both a Catholic and a Donatist bishopric were located there.

At the beginning of the 4th century, pagans outnumbered Christians. Punics formed the predominant population of towns and retained the Punic language until the 6th century; in certain towns the Christian bishops were obliged to know Punic, since it was the only language that the people understood.

Alexander Graham quoted Al-Andalus geographer and historian Al-Bakri, who wrote in the 11th century that, "We arrived at Sbiba, a town of great antiquity, built of stone, and containing a college and several baths. The whole country around is covered with gardens, and produces a saffron of the greatest excellence." (Note: Graham does not cite a translation of Al-Bakri. A translation, from Arabic into French, by William McGuckin de Slane, first published in 1859, describes it as a place where water and fruit were abundant; several creeks powered watermills; and the surroundings were gardens and produced perfect quality saffron.) René Louiche Desfontaines, in 1784, wrote that for several hours he marched through a forest of pines and Phoenician juniper before descending into the verdant plain in which Sbiba is situated. In 1862, Victor Guérin wrote that, it was long deserted and uninhabited; he commented that, on this vast site he could not find a "miserable hamlet of five or six huts", and only a "dozen tents belonging to the Madjer tribe". Robert Lambert Playfair, while travelling the same route taken by Desfontaines in 1877, wrote the forests which Desfontaines alluded to have disappeared. By 1886, Graham wrote, the site was an abandoned village, with no settlement within 48 km (30 mi), in an old field wilderness.

Although, in Latin, Sufetula is a diminutive of Sufes. Sufes should not be confused with Sufetula, both a different titular see, Sufetula (Latin: Sufetulensis), and a different site 40 km (25 mi) further south near Subaytilah. It was there that in AD 647, a major battle, between the Byzantine and Berber army led by Gregory the Patrician and the Rashidun Caliphate army led by Abdullah ibn Saad, ended in a decisive Muslim victory.

== Ruins ==
The ruins of Sufes consist of a basilica, converted after the seventh century into a mosque; a Roman temple, of which only the foundation survives; a Byzantine fort, built by Solomon, (Note: Ennabli cites Corpus Inscriptionum Latinarum (CIL) v.VIII no.259 and no.11429 which he supposes refer to it.) a praetorian prefect of Africa under Justinian I, of which only one wall survives and was built on a former Roman fort; and, a town wall. The fort, measured 45 m (148 ft) by 40 m (130 ft), had four corner towers, and was, like the other ancient ruins, dismantled for recycled construction material used in the rebuilding of the modern village.

Graham wrote that the Byzantine citadel, or walled enclosure, was constructed entirely of the stones of the Roman city. A huge mass of rubble is all that remains of a large thermae; and, a large semicircular nymphaeum, decorated with columns and statues, is only represented by the stone blocks which formed the base of the superstructure. The whole site is strewn with blocks of cut stone, fragments of moldings, and sculptured ornament. The nymphaeum was supplied with water drawn from wadi Sbiba through a 9 km (5.6 mi) aqueduct.

As part of a systematic survey, during the French protectorate of Tunisia, five location were listed on a 8 May 1895 state protection decree as three items for the site: the Sidi Okba mosque; rectangular enclosures A, B, C; and, the semicircular nymphaeum. There are more unexcavated ruins.

== Massacre of sixty Christians ==
Sufes is known for sixty Christian martyrs commemorated, in the Roman Martyrology, on 30 August, an event related to the legal persecution of pagans by the Christian Roman Empire. In 399, Honorius, through edicts to oppress pagan religion in ancient Rome, ordered the closing of pagan temples and the destruction of idols, (Note: Baxter cites Codex Theodosianus 16.10.16, 16.10.17, 16.10.18.) a cult statue of Hercules had been destroyed, and in retaliation the pagan inhabitants massacred sixty Christians. The cult of Hercules at Sufes is attested by an inscription to that god found among the ruins. (Note: Baxter cites Corpus Inscriptionum Latinarum (CIL) v.VIII no.262) Augustine of Hippo wrote a letter to the leaders of the colonia after the massacre. (Note: epistula L)

== The bishopric ==
Titular See of Sufes

Information
- Denomination: Catholic Church
- Sui iuris church: Latin Church

Current leadership
- Pope: Leo XIV
- Titular Bishop: Edward Michael Deliman

The names of a few of the bishops of Sufes are recorded:

- Privatus (mentioned in 255)
- Maximinus (mentioned in 411)
  - Peregrin (mentioned in 411), a Donatist
- Eustratius (mentioned in 484)

== Synod of Sufes ==
Sufes is also known for a church council that took place there in 525. The Synod of Sufes was related to the preceding Synod of Junca. Karl Josef von Hefele wrote that Giovanni Domenico Mansi assigned the year 523 to the Concilium Juncense (Junca) in the ecclesiastical province of Byzacena in Africa, which was previously assigned to the following year. (Note: Hefele noted that, at column 652 Mansi gives a letter from Archbishop Boniface of Carthage addressed to the bishops who were at the Council of Junca. That letter was dated xvii. Kal. Januarii, anno primo (i.e. of the Vandal King Hilderic), and said that for the following year, Easter was on the vii. Idus April. That letter was consequently written in December 523, and thus dated the Synod of Junca.) Hefele wrote that Liberatus, primate of the ecclesiastical province of Byzacena and president of the Synod of Junca, wrote a letter to Archbishop Boniface of Carthage, in which Liberatus said that the peace of the Church was restored at the Synod of Junca and he assured that full ecclesiastical liberty prevailed in the ecclesiastical province of Byzacena. What was further necessary, he wrote, would be conveyed through verbal messages by the bishops who were entrusted with the letter. The peace of the Church had been disturbed partly by a conflict between Liberatus and a monastery and partly by Bishop Vincentius' of Girba (Girbitanus) invasion of the ecclesiastical province of Byzacena, although he belonged to the ecclesiastical province of Tripolis, and consequently exercised his authority over people outside his ecclesiastical jurisdiction. When there was no bishop in Carthage, because of Vandal persecution, the monks had requested the primate of the ecclesiastical province of Byzacena, who was near to them, to ordain one of them into the priesthood for the needs of the monastery. This was done. Liberatus inferred that the monastery was now subject to him but the monks recognized the archbishop of Carthage as their superior. At the 525 Synod of Carthage, held after the Synod of Sufes, their abbot accused Liberatus of endeavoring to ruin their monastery and of excommunicating them. They asserted that the monastery should neither be subjected to one single bishop nor the monks be treated by Liberatus as his own clergy.

After the African bishops returned from exile and been freed from persecution, contests about their order of precedence broke out among them and some sought to get rid of their subordination to the archbishop of Carthage. Fulgentius Ferrandus in his Bremarium Canonicum gives us a canon of the Synod of Junca, which runs thus: Ut in plebe aliena nullus sibi episcopus audeat vindicare. Finally, we learn from the biography of Fulgentius of Ruspe that he was also present at the Synod of Junca (identified, by a transcription error, as Vincensis instead of Juncensis), and that the Synod gave him precedence over another bishop named Quodvultdeus. Quodvultdeus felt hurt by this, so Fulgentius of Ruspe requested at the next synod, the Synod of Sufes, also belonging to the province of Byzacena, that Quodvultdeus should again be given his previous precedence. No more is known of the Synod of Sufes.

== See also ==
- Titular see of Rucuma
