= James Xie Shiguang =

Chinese bishop

- Bishop of Funing
- Native name: 謝仕光
- Church: Catholic Church
- Diocese: Diocese of Funing
- In office: 25 January 1984 – 25 August 2005
- Predecessor: Thomas Niu Huiqing
- Successor: Ignatius Huang Shou-cheng
- Opposed to: Vincent Zhan Silu (2005); Peter Zhang Shi-zhi (1985-2005)

Orders
- Ordination: 3 May 1949
- Consecration: 25 January 1984 by Stephen Li Xinzheng

Personal details
- Born: May 7, 1917 Baoding, Hebei, Republic of China
- Died: August 25, 2005 (aged 88)

James Xie Shiguang (simplified Chinese: 谢仕光; traditional Chinese: 謝仕光; pinyin: Xiè Shìguāng; May 7, 1917 – August 25, 2005) was a bishop of the People's Republic of China's Underground Roman Catholic Church.

== Career ==
Xie was ordained to the priesthood on May 3, 1949, and he became a bishop on January 25, 1984.

=== Arrests ===
Xie was arrested multiple times in China. The first arrest was in 1955, when he refused to enter the Chinese Patriotic Catholic Association. He was arrested again for the same reason in 1958, but he was sentenced to 15 years imprisonment. He was then arrested in 1984, released in 1987, and was arrested yet again in 1990 until he was once again released in 1992.

In 1999, Xie was invited by Chinese government officials "for a chat" that lasted for two months. The location of the meeting is unknown. After the meeting, he was freed but was under surveillance for the rest of his life.

== Death ==
Xie died from leukemia on August 25, 2005, at the age of 88.

== Legacy ==
A street has been named after him in 2021 in Budapest.

== See also ==
- Catholicism in China
