= Ignatius Huang Shou-cheng =

Chinese Catholic bishop

- Bishop of Funing
- Native name: 黃守誠
- Church: Catholic Church
- Diocese: Diocese of Funing
- In office: 25 August 2005 – 30 July 2016
- Predecessor: James Xie Shiguang
- Successor: Vincent Guo Xijin
- Opposed to: Vincent Zhan Silu
- Previous post: Coadjutor Bishop of Funing (1985-2005)

Orders
- Ordination: 26 June 1949 by Thomas Niu Huiqing
- Consecration: 9 January 1985 by Paul Liu Shuhe

Personal details
- Born: 23 July 1923 Fu'an County, Fujian, Republic of China
- Died: 30 July 2016 (aged 93) Ningde, Fujian, China

Ignatius Huang Shou-cheng (23 July 1923 – 30 July 2016) was a Chinese Catholic bishop.

Ordained to the priesthood in 1949, Huang Shou-cheng was clandestinely ordained a bishop in 1985 and then served as bishop of the Roman Catholic Diocese of Funing, China.
