= Sjenokos =

- Village
- Location within Bosnia and Herzegovina
- Coordinates: 44.1896814°N 18.3216584°E
- Country: Bosnia and Herzegovina
- Entity: Federation of Bosnia and Herzegovina
- Canton: Zenica-Doboj
- Municipality: Vareš

Area
  - Total: 2.27 sq mi (5.87 km^{2})

Population (2013)
  - Total: 46
  - Density: 20/sq mi (7.8/km^{2})
- Time zone: UTC+1 (CET)
  - Summer (DST): UTC+2 (CEST)

Sjenokos is a village in the municipality of Vareš, Bosnia and Herzegovina.

== Demographics ==
According to the 2013 census, its population was 46.

Ethnicity in 2013
| Ethnicity | Number | Percentage |
|---|---|---|
| Croats | 44 | 95.7% |
| Serbs | 2 | 4.3% |
| Total | 46 | 100% |
