= Pajtov Han =

Village in Vareš, Bosnia and Herzegovina

- Village
- Location within Bosnia and Herzegovina
- Coordinates: 44.1082952°N 18.2937229°E
- Country: Bosnia and Herzegovina
- Entity: Federation of Bosnia and Herzegovina
- Canton: Zenica-Doboj
- Municipality: Vareš

Area
  - Total: 0.24 sq mi (0.61 km^{2})

Population (2013)
  - Total: 15
  - Density: 64/sq mi (25/km^{2})
- Time zone: UTC+1 (CET)
  - Summer (DST): UTC+2 (CEST)

Pajtov Han is a village in the municipality of Vareš, Bosnia and Herzegovina.

== Demographics ==
According to the 2013 census, its population was 15.

Ethnicity in 2013
Ethnicity	Number	Percentage
Serbs	7	46.7%
Bosniaks	7	46.7%
Croats	1	6.7%
Total	15	100%
