= Donja Vijaka =

Village in Vareš, Bosnia and Herzegovina

- Village
- Location within Bosnia and Herzegovina
- Coordinates: 44.2209132°N 18.408301°E
- Country: Bosnia and Herzegovina
- Entity: Federation of Bosnia and Herzegovina
- Canton: Zenica-Doboj
- Municipality: Vareš

Area
  - Total: 1.45 sq mi (3.76 km^{2})

Population (2013)
  - Total: 37
  - Density: 25/sq mi (9.8/km^{2})
- Time zone: UTC+1 (CET)
  - Summer (DST): UTC+2 (CEST)

Donja Vijaka is a village in the municipality of Vareš, Bosnia and Herzegovina. It was formerly named Vijaka Donja.

== Demographics ==
According to the 2013 census, its population was 37, all Croats.
