= Thelepte =

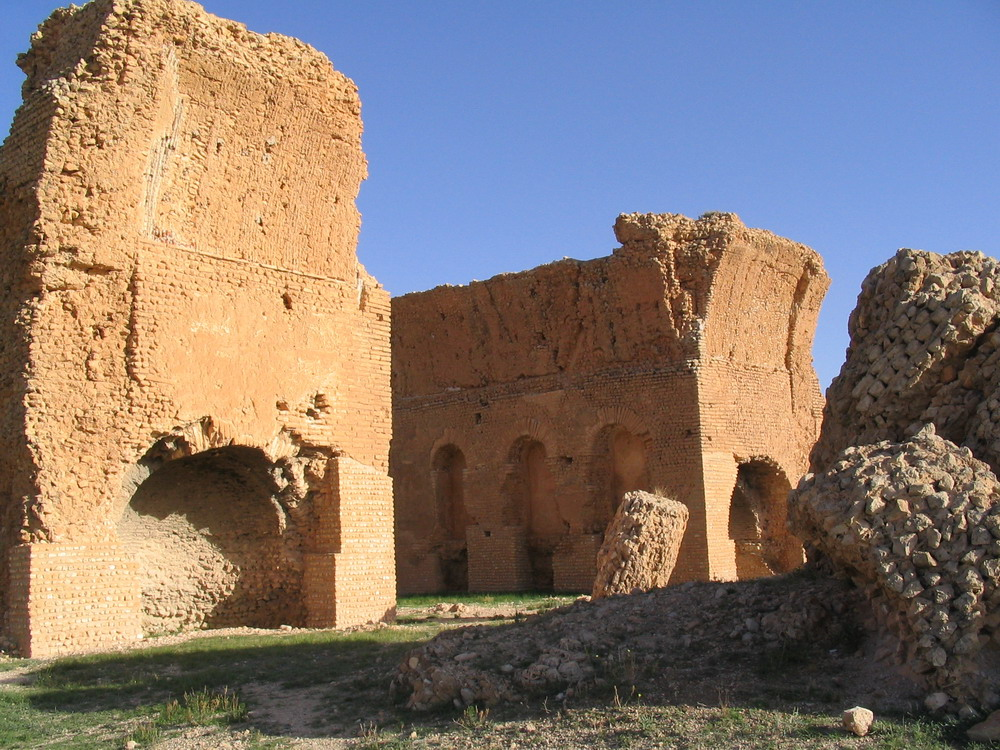
- ruins at Thelepte.

- Location in Tunisia
- Coordinates: 34°58′33″N 8°35′38″E
- Country: Tunisia
- Governorate: Kasserine Governorate

Population (2004)
  - Total: 6,046
- Time zone: UTC1 (CET)
- Postal code: 1250

Thelepte (Berber languages: تلابت) was a city in the Roman province of Byzacena, now in western Tunisia. It is located near the border with Algeria about 5 km north from the modern town of Fériana and 30 km south-west of the provincial capital Kasserine.

== History ==
The Roman city held the rank of colonia. An important network of roads branched out from it, linking it with Cilium and Theveste to the north, and Gafsa and Gabès to the south. In the 6th century it became the residence of the military governor of Byzacena. Procopius (De Ædificiis, VI, 6) says that the city was fortified by Justinian.

== Bishopric ==
The names of several of the bishops of Thélepte are known. Julianus was present at the Council of Carthage (256) that Cyprian called to consider the question of the lapsi; Donatianus, who assisted at the joint Council of Carthage (411) between Catholic and Donatist bishops and at a council in Carthage in 416 called by Saint Aurelius and at another in Milevum in the same year; he himself as senior bishop of the province held a council of the bishops of Byzacena in 418 either at Thelepte or at Zella (the manuscripts do not agree). Frumentius was one of the Catholic bishops whom the Arian Vandal king Huneric summoned to Carthage in 484 and then exiled. Stephanus was present at an anti-monothelitism Council of Byzacena in 641.

The Thélepte diocese is one of the 14 of Byzacena still mentioned in the Notitiae Episcopatuum of Byzantine Emperor Leo VI the Wise (886-912). But today, no longer being a residential bishopric, Thelepte is listed by the Catholic Church as a titular see.

== Present state ==
The ruins of Thelepte may be seen at Medinet el-Kedima, in Tunisia, a little to the north of Gafsa. The Byzantine citadel, in utter ruins, occupies the centre of the city. There are also the remains of baths, a theatre, and of ten churches recently discovered, one of which had a nave and four aisles.

== Fulgentius of Ruspe ==
Thelepte was the birthplace of Saint Fulgentius of Ruspe, who became bishop of Ruspe, whose exact location is uncertain.
