= Diocese of Yanggu =

Roman Catholic diocese in China

Diocese of Yanggu Dioecesis Iamcuvensis 天主教阳谷教区

Location
- Country: China
- Ecclesiastical province: Jinan
- Metropolitan: Jinan

Statistics
- Area: 3,244 km^{2} (1,253 sq mi)
- Population: Total; Catholics: (as of 1960); 1,430,000; 10,237 (0.7%)

Information
- Rite: Latin Rite
- Cathedral: Cathedral in Dingshui

Current leadership
- Pope: Leo XIV
- Bishop: Joseph Zhao Fengchang
- Metropolitan Archbishop: Joseph Zhang Xianwang

The Roman Catholic Diocese of Yanggu/Yangku (Latin: Iamcuven(sis), simplified Chinese: 阳谷; traditional Chinese: 陽穀; pinyin: Yánggǔ) is a diocese located in Yanggu in the ecclesiastical province of Jinan, and is centered in the Chinese province of Shandong.

== History ==
- December 13, 1933: Established as Apostolic Prefecture of Yanggu (陽穀) from the Apostolic Vicariate of Yanzhoufu (兖州府)
- July 11, 1939: Promoted as Apostolic Vicariate of Yanggu
- April 11, 1946: Promoted as Diocese of Yanggu

== Leadership ==
- Vicars Apostolic of Yanggu (Roman Rite)
  - Bishop Thomas Tien-ken-sin, S.V.D. (田耕莘) (later Cardinal) (July 11, 1939 – November 10, 1942)
  - Bishop Thomas Niu Huiqing (January 12, 1943 – April 11, 1946)
- Bishops of Yanggu (Roman rite)
  - Bishop Thomas Niu Huiqing (牛會卿) (April 11, 1946–February 28, 1973)
  - Bishop Joseph Li Bingyao, S.V.D. (1990–1995)
  - Bishop Joseph Zhao Fengchang (2000–present)
