= Mižnovići =

Village in Vareš, Bosnia and Herzegovina

- Village
- Location within Bosnia and Herzegovina
- Coordinates: 44.1733719°N 18.4919463°E
- Country: Bosnia and Herzegovina
- Entity: Federation of Bosnia and Herzegovina
- Canton: Zenica-Doboj
- Municipality: Vareš

Area
  - Total: 1.39 sq mi (3.61 km^{2})

Population (2013)
  - Total: 99
  - Density: 71/sq mi (27/km^{2})
- Time zone: UTC+1 (CET)
  - Summer (DST): UTC+2 (CEST)

Mižnovići is a village in the municipality of Vareš, Bosnia and Herzegovina.

== Demographics ==
According to the 2013 census, its population was 99.

Ethnicity in 2013
Ethnicity	Number	Percentage
Bosniaks	97	98.0%
other/undeclared	2	2.0%
Total	99	100%
