= Višnjići =

- Village
- Location within Bosnia and Herzegovina
- Coordinates: 44.1365418°N 18.3601424°E
- Country: Bosnia and Herzegovina
- Entity: Federation of Bosnia and Herzegovina
- Canton: Zenica-Doboj
- Municipality: Vareš

Area
  - Total: 1.98 sq mi (5.13 km^{2})

Population (2013)
  - Total: 24
  - Density: 12/sq mi (4.7/km^{2})
- Time zone: UTC+1 (CET)
  - Summer (DST): UTC+2 (CEST)

Višnjići is a village in the municipality of Vareš, Bosnia and Herzegovina.

== Demographics ==
According to the 2013 census, its population was 24.

Ethnicity in 2013
| Ethnicity | Number | Percentage |
|---|---|---|
| Croats | 20 | 83.3% |
| Serbs | 4 | 16.7% |
| Total | 24 | 100% |
