= Tisovci =

- Village
- Location within Bosnia and Herzegovina
- Coordinates: 44.1432851°N 18.3394608°E
- Country: Bosnia and Herzegovina
- Entity: Federation of Bosnia and Herzegovina
- Canton: Zenica-Doboj
- Municipality: Vareš

Area
  - Total: 0.65 sq mi (1.69 km^{2})

Population (2013)
  - Total: 41
  - Density: 63/sq mi (24/km^{2})
- Time zone: UTC+1 (CET)
  - Summer (DST): UTC+2 (CEST)

Tisovci is a village in the municipality of Vareš, Bosnia and Herzegovina.

== Demographics ==
According to the 2013 census, its population was 41, all Croats.
