= Kopališta =

Village in Vareš, Bosnia and Herzegovina

- Village
- Location within Bosnia and Herzegovina
- Coordinates: 44.2216291°N 18.303802°E
- Country: Bosnia and Herzegovina
- Entity: Federation of Bosnia and Herzegovina
- Canton: Zenica-Doboj
- Municipality: Vareš

Area
  - Total: 1.61 sq mi (4.17 km^{2})

Population (2013)
  - Total: 10
  - Density: 6.2/sq mi (2.4/km^{2})
- Time zone: UTC+1 (CET)
  - Summer (DST): UTC+2 (CEST)

Kopališta is a village in the municipality of Vareš, Bosnia and Herzegovina.

== Demographics ==
According to the 2013 census, its population was 10, all Croats.
