= Zubeta =

- Village
- Location within Bosnia and Herzegovina
- Coordinates: 44.1299411°N 18.4329222°E
- Country: Bosnia and Herzegovina
- Entity: Federation of Bosnia and Herzegovina
- Canton: Zenica-Doboj
- Municipality: Vareš

Area
  - Total: 1.58 sq mi (4.08 km^{2})

Population (2013)
  - Total: 115
  - Density: 73.0/sq mi (28.2/km^{2})
- Time zone: UTC+1 (CET)
  - Summer (DST): UTC+2 (CEST)

Zubeta is a village in the municipality of Vareš, Bosnia and Herzegovina.

== Demographics ==
According to the 2013 census, its population was 115, all Bosniaks.
