= Ivančevo =

Village in Vareš, Bosnia and Herzegovina

- Village
- Location within Bosnia and Herzegovina
- Coordinates: 44.2070°N 18.4136°E
- Country: Bosnia and Herzegovina
- Entity: Federation of Bosnia and Herzegovina
- Canton: Zenica-Doboj
- Municipality: Vareš

Area
  - Total: 2.95 sq mi (7.65 km^{2})

Population (2013)
  - Total: 50
  - Density: 17/sq mi (6.5/km^{2})
- Time zone: UTC+1 (CET)
  - Summer (DST): UTC+2 (CEST)

Ivančevo is a village in the municipality of Vareš, Bosnia and Herzegovina.

== Demographics ==
According to the 2013 census, its population was 50.

Ethnicity in 2013
Ethnicity	Number	Percentage
Croats	49	98.0%
other/undeclared	1	2.0%
Total	50	100%
