= Semizova Ponikva =

- Village
- Location within Bosnia and Herzegovina
- Coordinates: 44.1746251°N 18.2705259°E
- Country: Bosnia and Herzegovina
- Entity: Federation of Bosnia and Herzegovina
- Canton: Zenica-Doboj
- Municipality: Vareš

Area
  - Total: 2.78 sq mi (7.19 km^{2})

Population (2013)
  - Total: 23
  - Density: 8.3/sq mi (3.2/km^{2})
- Time zone: UTC+1 (CET)
  - Summer (DST): UTC+2 (CEST)

Semizova Ponikva is a village in the municipality of Vareš, Bosnia and Herzegovina.

== Demographics ==
According to the 2013 census, its population was 23, all Croats.
