= Striježevo =

- Village
- Location within Bosnia and Herzegovina
- Coordinates: 44.0939443°N 18.2814107°E
- Country: Bosnia and Herzegovina
- Entity: Federation of Bosnia and Herzegovina
- Canton: Zenica-Doboj
- Municipality: Vareš

Area
  - Total: 1.64 sq mi (4.24 km^{2})

Population (2013)
  - Total: 350
  - Density: 210/sq mi (83/km^{2})
- Time zone: UTC+1 (CET)
  - Summer (DST): UTC+2 (CEST)

Striježevo is a village in the municipality of Vareš, Bosnia and Herzegovina.

== Demographics ==
According to the 2013 census, its population was 350, all Bosniaks.
