= Bijelo Borje =

Village in Vareš, Bosnia and Herzegovina

Bijelo Borje Бијело Борје
- Village
- Location within Bosnia and Herzegovina
- Coordinates: 44°07′55″N 18°19′49″E
- Country: Bosnia and Herzegovina
- Entity: Federation of Bosnia and Herzegovina
- Canton: Zenica-Doboj
- Municipality: Vareš

Area
  - Total: 0.92 sq mi (2.38 km^{2})

Population (2013)
  - Total: 16
  - Density: 17/sq mi (6.7/km^{2})
- Time zone: UTC+1 (CET)
  - Summer (DST): UTC+2 (CEST)

Bijelo Borje (Cyrillic: Бијело Борје) is a village in the municipality of Vareš, Bosnia and Herzegovina.

== Demographics ==
According to the 2013 census, its population was 16.

Ethnicity in 2013
| Ethnicity | Number | Percentage |
|---|---|---|
| Croats | 13 | 81.3% |
| Bosniaks | 1 | 6.3% |
| Serbs | 0 | 0.0% |
| other/undeclared | 2 | 12.5% |
| Total | 16 | 100% |
