= Budoželje =

Village in Vareš, Bosnia and Herzegovina

- Village
- Location within Bosnia and Herzegovina
- Coordinates: 44.0838851°N 18.3307976°E
- Country: Bosnia and Herzegovina
- Entity: Federation of Bosnia and Herzegovina
- Canton: Zenica-Doboj
- Municipality: Vareš

Area
  - Total: 5.62 sq mi (14.56 km^{2})

Population (2013)
  - Total: 698
  - Density: 124/sq mi (47.9/km^{2})
- Time zone: UTC+1 (CET)
  - Summer (DST): UTC+2 (CEST)

Budoželje is a village in the municipality of Vareš, Bosnia and Herzegovina.

== Demographics ==
According to the 2013 census, its population was 698.

Ethnicity in 2013
Ethnicity	Number	Percentage
Bosniaks	687	98.4%
other/undeclared	11	1.6%
Total	698	100%
