= Brgule, Vareš =

Village in Vareš, Bosnia and Herzegovina

Brgule
- Village
- Location within Bosnia and Herzegovina
- Coordinates: 44.1329749°N 18.388731°E
- Country: Bosnia and Herzegovina
- Entity: Federation of Bosnia and Herzegovina
- Canton: Zenica-Doboj
- Municipality: Vareš

Area
  - Total: 4.53 sq mi (11.74 km^{2})

Population (2013)
  - Total: 13
  - Density: 2.9/sq mi (1.1/km^{2})
- Time zone: UTC+1 (CET)
  - Summer (DST): UTC+2 (CEST)

Brgule is a village in the municipality of Vareš, Bosnia and Herzegovina.

== Demographics ==
According to the 2013 census, its population was 13.

Ethnicity in 2013
Ethnicity	Number	Percentage
Serbs	10	76.9%
Bosniaks	3	23.1%
Total	13	100%
