= Strica =

- Village
- Location within Bosnia and Herzegovina
- Coordinates: 44.1945133°N 18.3432151°E
- Country: Bosnia and Herzegovina
- Entity: Federation of Bosnia and Herzegovina
- Canton: Zenica-Doboj
- Municipality: Vareš

Area
  - Total: 0.53 sq mi (1.38 km^{2})

Population (2013)
  - Total: 52
  - Density: 98/sq mi (38/km^{2})
- Time zone: UTC+1 (CET)
  - Summer (DST): UTC+2 (CEST)

Strica is a village in the municipality of Vareš, Bosnia and Herzegovina.

== Demographics ==
According to the 2013 census, its population was 52.

Ethnicity in 2013
Ethnicity	Number	Percentage
Croats	49	94.2%
Serbs	2	3.8%
Bosniaks	1	1.9%
Total	52	100%
