= Kolonija Pržići =

Village in Vareš, Bosnia and Herzegovina

- Village
- Location within Bosnia and Herzegovina
- Coordinates: 44.1470471°N 18.3424578°E
- Country: Bosnia and Herzegovina
- Entity: Federation of Bosnia and Herzegovina
- Canton: Zenica-Doboj
- Municipality: Vareš

Area
  - Total: 0.10 sq mi (0.27 km^{2})

Population (2013)
  - Total: 18
  - Density: 170/sq mi (67/km^{2})
- Time zone: UTC+1 (CET)
  - Summer (DST): UTC+2 (CEST)

Kolonija Pržići is a village in the municipality of Vareš, Bosnia and Herzegovina.

== Demographics ==
According to the 2013 census, its population was 18, all Croats.
