= Gornja Vijaka =

Village in Vareš, Bosnia and Herzegovina

- Village
- Location within Bosnia and Herzegovina
- Coordinates: 44.2096497°N 18.4250161°E
- Country: Bosnia and Herzegovina
- Entity: Federation of Bosnia and Herzegovina
- Canton: Zenica-Doboj
- Municipality: Vareš

Area
  - Total: 1.73 sq mi (4.47 km^{2})

Population (2013)
  - Total: 57
  - Density: 33/sq mi (13/km^{2})
- Time zone: UTC+1 (CET)
  - Summer (DST): UTC+2 (CEST)

Gornja Vijaka is a village in the municipality of Vareš, Bosnia and Herzegovina. It was formerly named Vijaka Gornja.

== Demographics ==
According to the 2013 census, its population was 57.

Ethnicity in 2013
Ethnicity	Number	Percentage
Croats	55	96.5%
Serbs	1	1.8%
other/undeclared	1	1.8%
Total	57	100%
