= Radonjići, Vareš =

Village in Vareš, Bosnia and Herzegovina

Radonjići Радоњићи
- Village
- Location within Bosnia and Herzegovina
- Coordinates: 44.0944082°N 18.268612°E
- Country: Bosnia and Herzegovina
- Entity: Federation of Bosnia and Herzegovina
- Canton: Zenica-Doboj
- Municipality: Vareš

Area
  - Total: 1.02 sq mi (2.63 km^{2})

Population (2013)
  - Total: 151
  - Density: 149/sq mi (57.4/km^{2})
- Time zone: UTC+1 (CET)
  - Summer (DST): UTC+2 (CEST)

Radonjići is a village in the municipality of Vareš, Bosnia and Herzegovina.

== Demographics ==
According to the 2013 census, its population was 151, all Bosniaks.
