= Milo Cipra =

- Born: Emil Cipra; October 13, 1906; Vareš, Austria-Hungary
- Died: July 9, 1985 (aged 78); Zagreb, SR Croatia, SFR Yugoslavia
- Occupation: Composer
- Years active: 1930–1985

Milo Cipra (born as Emil Cipra, 13 October 1906 – 9 July 1985) was a Croatian composer, member of the Croatian Academy of Sciences and Arts (since 1976), dean of the Zagreb Music Academy (1961–1971).

== Major works ==
- Sonatina u d-molu for piano, 1930
- Slavenska rapsodija for orchestra, 1931
- Sonata za violinu i klavir, 1944
- I. simfonija, 1948
- II. simfonija, 1952
- Kantata o čovjeku, 1958
- Sunčev put, 1959
- Musica sine nomine, 1963
- Aubade, 1965
- Leda, 1965
- Triptihon dalmatinskih gradova, 1969–1976
- Meditation sur Re, 1975
- Trio za obou, klarinet i fagot, 1978
