= Qiji, Yanggu County =

Qiji 七级镇
- Town
- Location in Shandong Qiji (China)
- Coordinates: 36°14′52″N 116°01′36″E
- Country: People's Republic of China
- Province: Shandong
- Prefecture-level city: Liaocheng
- County: Yanggu
- Time zone: UTC+8 (China Standard)

Qiji (Chinese: 七级镇) is a town in Yanggu County, Liaocheng, in western Shandong province, China.
