= Ruspe =

Town in the Roman province of Byzacena

Ruspe or Ruspae was a town in the Roman province of Byzacena, in Africa propria. It served as the episcopal see of Saint Fulgentius of Ruspe. It is now a Roman Catholic titular bishopric.

== Name ==
The name "Ruspe" is usually understood to be a hellenization of a Phoenician name including the element "rush" (Punic: 𐤓𐤔, rš), meaning "head" or "headland".

The Tabula Peutingeriana notes the Byzacenan towns of Ruspina and Ruspe, the latter being to the south of the former. Ptolemy's Geography usually mentions the same two towns in the same order, although Stevenson's defective English translation gives "Ruspina" and "Rheuspena". The name "Ruspe", a Greek feminine singular name, also appears in a list of dioceses that the Greek Orthodox Patriarchate of Alexandria saw as dependent on itself at the beginning of the 8th century. Henricus de Noris considered it equivalent to the Latin Ruspa. "Ruspae", a Latin feminine plural name, was preferred by Alexander MacBean, William Smith, Morcelli; Mesnage, and the Annuario Pontificio.

== Geography ==
According to the Tabula Peutingeriana, Ruspe was situated between Acholla and Usilla. It was near the promontory that Ptolemy called Brachodes, the Romans' Caput Vadorum, later known as Capaudia or—in Arabic—Qaboudia (cf. Chebba).

Ruspe was commonly identified with the ruins known as Sbia or Henchir Sbia in present-day Tunisia, four miles west of that cape. An alternative site is that of the ruins known as Ksour Siad. In the mid-20th century, a new argument emerged in favour of Koudiat Rosfa, 30 kilometers north of Sfax, because of the discovery in 1947 of an inscription at Henchir Bou Tria that seems to identify that place with ancient Acholla. (Saumagne had earlier proposed to identify it with Ruspe.) A nearby headland is called Rass Bou Tria. This identification of Acholla gives grounds for considering Ptolemy mistaken in placing Acholla and Usilla north of Cape Brachodes and for identifying Ruspe as Koudiat Rosfa, which is seen as having preserved the ancient name in an Arabic form. Excavations at Koudiat Rosfa have not confirmed the perhaps flattering description applied to the city by Fulgentius's biographer Ferrandus: "a noble town illustrious for its famous inhabitants" (Latin: nobile oppidum clarissimis habitatoribus prorsus illustre).

== Religion ==
The city was important enough in the Roman province of Byzacena to become a suffragan of its Metropolitan of Archdiocese of Hadrumetum, but was to fade.

Bishops of Ruspe earlier than Saint Fulgentius (Italian: Fulgenzio di Ruspe) whose names are known are

- Secundus, who was at the Conference of Carthage (411) that brought together Catholic and Donatist bishops – Morcelli assigns him instead to an otherwise unknown diocese of Ruspina –
- Stephanus, one of the Catholic bishops whom the Arian Vandal king Huneric summoned to Carthage in 484 and then exiled.

The immediate successor of Fulgentius was Felicianus, his companion in exile, who participated in the Council of Carthage (534).

- Iulianus attended the Council of Carthage (646), an anti-Monothelitism council.

=== Titular see ===
No longer a residential bishopric, Ruspae (the spelling used in the Annuario Pontificio) is today listed by the Catholic Church as a titular see.

The bishops who have held this title are:

- Vincenzo de Via (1757.12.19 – 1762.01.31)
- Manuel Obellar, O.P. (1778.01.29 – 1789.09.07)
- Grgo Ilić, O.F.M. (1796.09.30 – 1799.06.01)
- Edward Bede Slater, O.S.B. (1818.06.18 – 1832.07.15)
- Romualdo Jimeno Ballesteros, O.P. (1839.08.02 – 1846.01.19)
- Antonio Maria Buhagiar, O.F.M. Cap. (1884.08.08 – 1891.08.10)
- Spiridion Poloméni (1892.02.27 – 1930.09.12)
- Joseph Louis Aldée Desmarais (1931.01.30 – 1939.06.22)
- Thomas Tien-ken-sin (田耕莘), S.V.D. (1939.07.11 – 1946.02.18), as Apostolic Vicar of Yanggu 陽穀 (China) (1939.07.11 – 1942.11.10) and then Apostolic Vicar of Qingdao 青島 (China) (1942.11.10 – 1946.04.11); previously Apostolic Prefect of Yanggu 陽穀 (China) (1934.02.23 – 1939.07.11); later Cardinal-Priest of S. Maria in Via (1946.02.22 – 1967.07.24), Metropolitan Archbishop of Beijing 北京 (PR China) (1946.04.11 – 1967.07.24), Apostolic Administrator of Taipei 臺北 (Taiwan) (1959.12.16 – 1966.02.15)
- Joseph Carroll McCormick (1947.01.11 – 1960.06.25)
- David Monas Maloney (1960.11.05 – 1967.12.02)
- Horacio Arturo Gómez Dávila (1968.07.03 – 1974.09.15)
- Enzo Ceccarelli Catraro, S.D.B. (1974.10.05 – 1998.11.15)
- Vlado Košić (1998.12.29 – 2009.12.05)
- Rafael Biernaski (2010.02.10 – 2015.06.24)
- Nuno Manuel dos Santos Almeida (21.11.2015) incumbent.

== Sources and external links ==
- GigaCatholic, with titular incumbent biography links
