= Echeng, Shandong =

Echeng 阿城镇 Acheng
- Town
- Location in Shandong Echeng (China)
- Coordinates: 36°09′42″N 116°03′02″E
- Country: People's Republic of China
- Province: Shandong
- Prefecture-level city: Liaocheng
- County: Yanggu
- Time zone: UTC+8 (China Standard)

Echeng (Chinese: 阿城镇) is a town in Yanggu County, Liaocheng, in western Shandong province, China.
