= Shiwuliyuan =

Shiwuliyuan 十五里园镇
- Town
- Location in Shandong Shiwuliyuan (China)
- Coordinates: 36°02′51″N 115°55′20″E
- Country: People's Republic of China
- Province: Shandong
- Prefecture-level city: Liaocheng
- County: Yanggu
- Time zone: UTC+8 (China Standard)

Shiwuliyuan (Chinese: 十五里园镇) is a town in Yanggu County, Liaocheng, in western Shandong province, China.
