= Anle, Shandong =

Anle 安乐镇
- Town
- Location in Shandong Anle (China)
- Coordinates: 36°13′00″N 115°55′16″E
- Country: People's Republic of China
- Province: Shandong
- Prefecture-level city: Liaocheng
- County: Yanggu
- Time zone: UTC+8 (China Standard)

Anle (Chinese: 安乐镇) is a town in Yanggu County, Liaocheng, in western Shandong province, China. As of 2018, it has 45 villages under its administration.

== See also ==
- List of township-level divisions of Shandong
