= Augustin Miletić =

Bosnian Catholic Franciscan and prelate (1763–1831)

The Most Reverend Augustin Miletić O.F.M.
- Apostolic Vicar of Bosnia Titular Bishop of Daulis
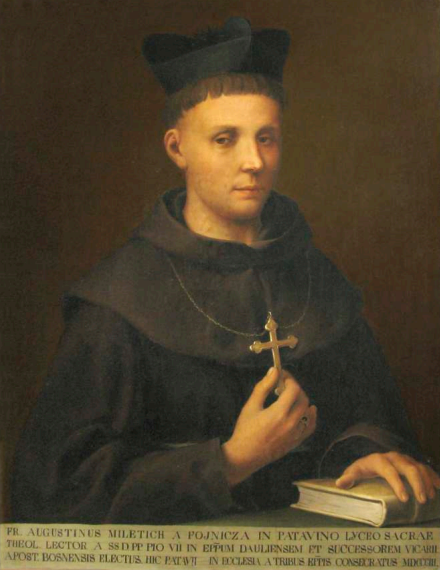
- Portrait of Augustin Miletić from 1803
- Church: Catholic Church
- Diocese: Bosnia
- Appointed: 1 March 1813
- Term ended: 18 July 1831
- Predecessor: Grgo Ilijić
- Successor: Rafael Barišić
- Other post: Coadjutor Apostolic Vicar of Bosnia (1803–13)

Orders
- Consecration: 12 June 1803 by Giuseppe Peruzzi

Personal details
- Born: c. 1762 Fojnica, Bosnia, Ottoman Empire
- Died: 18 July 1831 (aged 68–69) Livno, Bosnia, Ottoman Empire
- Buried: Rapovine, Livno, Bosnia and Herzegovina
- Denomination: Catholic

Fra Augustin Miletić (1763–1831) was a Bosnian Franciscan and prelate of the Catholic Church who served as the apostolic vicar of Bosnia from 1813 to his death in 1831.

== Biography ==
Fra Augustin Miletić was born 16 February 1763 in Fojnica in Eyalet of Bosnia. He entered the Franciscan order after ending the primary education in Fojnica. He finished high school in Graz and studied philosophy and theology in Italy. When he finished his studies he became a professor of philosophy and theology in Brescia and Padua. Later he became a bishop of Grgo Ilijić (1798–1813), and in the same year, he became also the Apostolic administration of the Apostolic Vicariate in Bosnia. After the bishop Grgo Ilijić's death, he was appointed bishop of the same Vicariate (1813–1831). Fra Augustin Miletić died in Livno 1831, during one of his many pastoral visits.

The chronicler Fra Mato Mitić wrote about Augustin Miletić in following way: "All I can say, for another prelate of his stature among Bosniaks to appear, many centuries will pass."
