= Željko Ivanković =

- Born: August 29, 1954 (age 72); Vareš, FPR Yugoslavia
- Occupations: Poet, novelist, short story writer, essayist, translator

Željko Ivanković (born August 29, 1954 in Vareš) is a Yugoslavian and Bosnian poet, novelist, short story writer, essayist, translator.

== Recent activity ==
In 2017, Željko Ivanković has signed the Declaration on the Common Language of the Croats, Serbs, Bosniaks and Montenegrins.

== Works ==
=== Books ===
- Nesto od onog što jest, Sarajevo, 1978 (poetry)
- Utrka puzeva, Sarajevo, 1982 (poetry)
- Vrijeme bez glagola, Sarajevo, 1986 (poetry)
- (D)ogledi, Tuzla, 1987 (studies, essays, literary criticism)
- Price o ljubavi i smrti, Banja Luka (short stories)
- Urusavanje slike, Sarajevo, 1990 (poetry)
- Zvjezdangrad, Sarajevo, 1990; Wuppertal, 1995; Sarajevo, 2000; Sarajevo-Wuppertal, 2005 (short stories for children)
- Dodirom i svijet poce, Sarajevo, 1992; Zagreb-Sarajevo, 2006 (novel)
- 700 dana opsade, Zagreb, 1995 (war journal)
- Izgubljeni zavicaj, Ljubljana, 1995 (poetry)
- Ljubav u Berlinu, Zagreb, 1995; Sarajevo, 1995 (novel)
- Tko je upalio mrak?, Zagreb, 1995; Sarajevo, 2000 (short stories)
- (D)ogledi, II, Zenica, 1997 (essays)
- Trazenje zavicaja, Zagreb, 1997 (poetry)
- Izbor poezije, Sarajevo, 1999 (poetry)
- Pisci franjevci vareskog kraja, Split-Vareš, 1999 (essays)
- (D)ogledi, III, Mostar, 2000 (studies, essays, literary criticism)
- Nove price o ljubavi i smrti, Zagreb-Sarajevo, 2001 (short stories)
- Na marginama kaosa, Sarajevo, 2001 (essays)
- Raskos, hladna mjesecina, Zagreb, 2002 (poetry)
- Odrastanja, Sarajevo, 2002 (short stories for children)
- Vareske price, Vareš-Wuppertal, 2003 (short stories)
- Izbor prica hrvatskih pisaca za djecu u Bosni i Hercegovini, Sarajevo–Zagreb–Wuppertal, 2005.
- Izbor pjesama hrvatskih pisaca za djecu u Bosni i Hercegovini, Sarajevo–Zagreb–Wuppertal, 2005.
- Isus je procitao novine, Sarajevo, 2006 (poetry)
- Tetoviranje identiteta. Pohlepa za prošlošću (studije i eseji), Sarajevo, 2007 (essays)
- Dnevnik melankolije, Sarajevo, 2008. (poezija)
- Citati Ivankovica u Sarajevu, Sarajevo, 2010. (polemike)
- Na svoji baštini, Sarajevo, 2010. (priče)
- Pogled s margine, Mostar, 2011. (kolumne)

=== Translations ===
- Mozart: Pisma ocu, Banja Luka, 1990., 1991., 2003.
- Price stare Kine, Sarajevo, 1991.
- Heinrich Böll: Potraga za citateljem, Sarajevo, 2001.
- G. A. Bürger: Pustolovine baruna Münchhausena, Sarajevo, 2003. (koautorstvo s Romanom Ivankovicem)
- Israel Zwi Kanner: Zidovske price, Zagreb – Sarajevo, 2007.
- Mozart: Pisma, Zagreb, 2007.
- Hans Küng: Izborena sloboda. Sjecanja, Rijeka – Sarajevo, 2009. (koautorstvo s Romanom Ivankovicem)
