= Borovica =

Village in Vareš, Bosnia and Herzegovina

Borovica Боровица
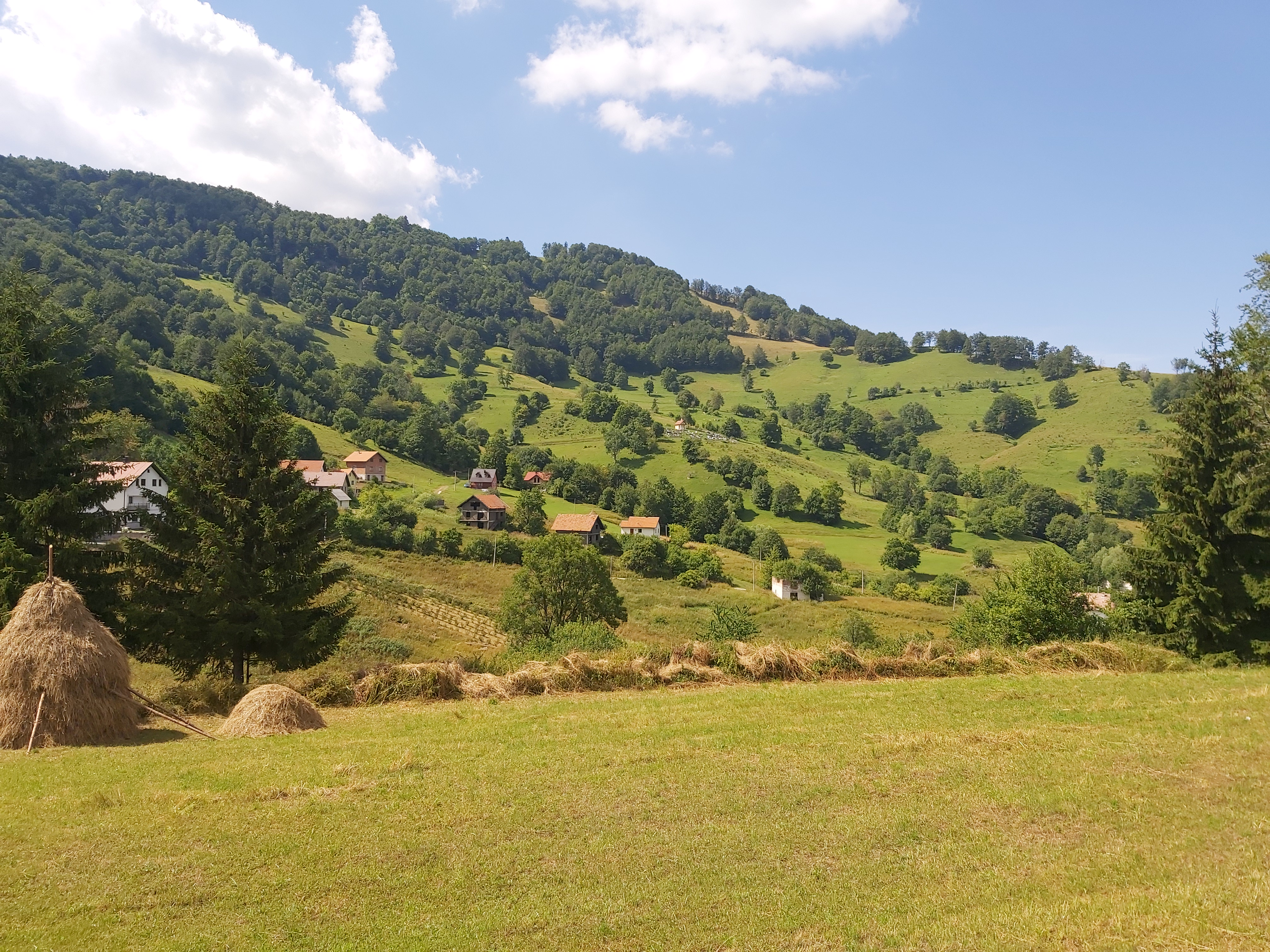
- View on Borovica

- Location within Bosnia and Herzegovina
- Country: Bosnia and Herzegovina
- Entity: Federation of Bosnia and Herzegovina
- Canton: Zenica-Doboj
- Municipality: Vareš

Area
  - Total: 5.38 sq mi (13.94 km^{2})

Population (2013)
  - Total: 146
  - Density: 27.1/sq mi (10.5/km^{2})
- Time zone: UTC+1 (CET)
  - Summer (DST): UTC+2 (CEST)

Borovica (Боровица; German: Borowitz) divided into the villages of Borovica Donja and Borovica Gornja, is a small village in the middle of Bosnia and Herzegovina near today's Vareš, and is situated near the old medieval castle Bobovac, the residence of the Bosnian kings.

The village became famous in the Middle Ages for its mining industry, which was mainly based on gold and iron ore. The inhabitants of Borovica originate from immigrated miners from the region of Saxony in Germany. For this reason, the descendants of the present day still have blonde hair and blue eyes with a typical German look. The first written document about Borovica is dated to the year 1637 and confirms the arrival of a bishop and 19 people at that time.

== Demographics ==
The village, whose ethnic background is fully Croat, was mostly destroyed during the war in Bosnia and Herzegovina and the inhabitants forced to flee. At that time, Borovica's population was 1,511; in 2013, approximately 100 Croats were still living there. Some of them returned after the war in 1992.
