= Litai, Shandong =

Litai 李台镇
- Town
- Location in Shandong Litai (China)
- Coordinates: 35°59′57″N 115°44′34″E
- Country: People's Republic of China
- Province: Shandong
- Prefecture-level city: Liaocheng
- County: Yanggu
- Time zone: UTC+8 (China Standard)

Litai (Chinese: 李台镇) is a town in Yanggu County, Liaocheng, in western Shandong province, China.
