= Zhangqiu, Yanggu =

Zhangqiu 山东省 聊城市 阳谷县 张秋镇
- Town
- Location in Shandong Zhangqiu (China)
- Coordinates: 36°04′14″N 116°00′24″E
- Country: People's Republic of China
- Province: Shandong
- Prefecture-level city: Liaocheng
- County: Yanggu
- Time zone: UTC+8 (China Standard)

Zhangqiu (Chinese: 张秋镇) is a town in Yanggu County, Liaocheng City, in western Shandong province, China.
