= Vincent Zhan Silu =

- (Patriotic) Bishop of Funing
- Native name: 詹思禄
- Church: Chinese Catholic Patriotic Association; Catholic Church (since 2018)
- Diocese: Diocese of Funing
- Installed: September 22, 2018
- Predecessor: Peter Zhang Shi-zhi
- Opposed to: Vincent Guo Xijin (2016-2018); Ignatius Huang Shou-cheng (2005-2016); James Xie Shiguang (2005)
- Previous post: (Patriotic) Auxiliary Bishop of Funing (2000-2005)

Orders
- Ordination: June 24, 1989
- Consecration: January 6, 2000 by Joseph Liu Yuanren

Personal details
- Born: March 13, 1961 (age 65) Ningde County, Fujian, China
- Coat of arms: Vincent Zhan Silu's coat of arms

Vincent Zhan Silu (born March 13, 1961) is the current Roman Catholic bishop of the archdiocese of Funing.

== Biography ==
Zhiu was consecrated priest on June 24, 1989, and bishop on January 6, 2000, serving as auxiliary bishop of Funing without papal permission being excommunicated latae sententiae and had been serving as bishop of Funing since August 5, 2005.

On September 22, 2018, Pope Francis lifted the excommunication of Zhan Silu and other six bishops previously appointed by the Chinese government without a pontifical mandate.

== See also ==
- Joseph Ma Yinglin
- Joseph Liu Xinhong
- Bernardine Dong Guangqing

== Sources ==
- Asianews.it
- BBC
