= Joseph Zhao Fengchang =

Chinese Roman Catholic bishop (born 1934)

- Bishop of Yanggu
- Native name: 趙鳳昌
- Church: Catholic Church
- Diocese: Diocese of Yanggu
- See: Yanggu
- Appointed: 1999
- Predecessor: Joseph Li Bingyao

Orders
- Ordination: 29 September 1985
- Consecration: 7 May 2000 by Joseph Ma Xuesheng

Personal details
- Born: 8 February 1934 (age 92) Jining, Shandong, China

Joseph Zhao Fengchang (Chinese: 趙鳳昌; born 8 February 1934) is a Chinese Roman Catholic prelate who served as Bishop of Yanggu in Shandong, China. He was ordained a priest in 1985 and consecrated a bishop on 7 May 2000.

== Early life ==
Joseph Fengchang Zhao was born on 8 February 1934 in Beixinzhuang, in Jining County, Shandong, China. He studied at St. Joseph Minor Seminary in Zhoucun and the Minor Seminary of St. Augustine in Yanzhou. Between 1951 and 1952, he received private lessons from priests in Yanzhou. He subsequently became a primary school teacher and, after leaving teaching, resumed private studies with priests in Jining. In 1958, he began studying theology and philosophy at the Holy Spirit Major Seminary in Jinan.

Amid the political upheavals in China beginning in the 1950s, Zhao remained at home and worked as a farmer from 1962 to 1983. Following the end of the Cultural Revolution, he entered the National Seminary in Beijing, where he studied from 1983 to 1985. He was ordained a priest upon graduation on 29 September 1985. From 1985 to 1996, he served in Jining, after which he became spiritual director of the Holy Spirit Major Seminary in Jinan.

== Episcopal ministry ==
In 1999, church authorities in Beijing combined the Diocese of Yanggu and the Apostolic Prefecture of Linqing to form the Diocese of Liaocheng, and Zhao was elected its bishop. He received episcopal consecration on 7 May 2000, with papal approval. The Holy See, however, did not recognize the newly established Diocese of Liaocheng and continued to regard Zhao as Bishop of Yanggu.

Zhao served as Bishop of Yanggu, a Catholic diocese in Shandong Province. In January 2003, he spoke to UCA News about the missionary work of Joseph Freinademetz, a Catholic missionary who had worked extensively in southern Shandong. Zhao described Freinademetz as well respected among Chinese people for his missionary activities.

== 2006 episcopal ordination controversy ==
On 29 November 2006, Zhao participated in the episcopal ordination of Wang Renlei as coadjutor bishop of Xuzhou, an ordination conducted without the approval of the Holy See. Contemporary reporting identified Zhao as one of several bishops expected to attend the ceremony at the Sacred Heart of Jesus Cathedral in Xuzhou.

According to AsiaNews, Zhao and Bishop Joseph Xu Honggen were isolated and subjected to physical and psychological pressure ahead of the ceremony. The report described the pressure as part of efforts by Chinese authorities to secure the participation of bishops in ordinations not approved by the Holy See. The account was published before the ceremony and described the circumstances reported by sources at the time.

The episode took place amid longstanding tensions between the Chinese government and the Holy See over the appointment and consecration of Catholic bishops in mainland China. The Vatican maintains that papal authority is central to the appointment of bishops in the Catholic Church, while Chinese state-sanctioned church institutions have historically operated under a separate governmental framework.

== See also ==
- Catholic Church in China
- Chinese Patriotic Catholic Association
- China–Holy See relations
- Diocese of Yanggu
