= Edward Michael Deliman =

American prelate

His Excellency, The Most Reverend Edward Michael Deliman
- Auxiliary Bishop Emeritus of Philadelphia; Titular Bishop of Sufes
- Archdiocese: Philadelphia
- Appointed: May 31, 2016
- Installed: August 18, 2016
- Retired: May 13, 2022
- Other post: Titular Bishop of Sufes

Orders
- Ordination: May 19, 1973 by John Krol
- Consecration: August 18, 2016 by Charles J. Chaput, Ronald William Gainer, and Nelson J. Perez

Personal details
- Born: March 4, 1947 (age 79) Lorain, Ohio, U.S.
- Motto: Blessed are the merciful

Styles of Edward Michael Deliman
- Reference style: His Excellency; The Most Reverend
- Spoken style: Your Excellency
- Religious style: Bishop

Edward Michael Deliman (born March 4, 1947) is an American prelate of the Roman Catholic Church who served as an auxiliary bishop for the Archdiocese of Philadelphia from 2016 until 2022.

== Biography ==
=== Early life ===
Edward Deliman was born on March 4, 1947, in Lorain, Ohio. After finishing high school, he attended St. Charles Borromeo Seminary in Philadelphia, where he received a bachelor's degree in 1969. In 1973, Deliman completed a Master of Divinity degree at St. Charles Borromeo.

=== Priesthood ===
.On May 19, 1973, Deliman was ordained to the priesthood for the Archdiocese of Philadelphia by Cardinal John Krol. Deliman served as assistant pastor in the following parishes:

- St. Joseph in Cheltenham Township, 1973-1977
- St. Clement in Philadelphia, 1977-1978
- St. John Bosco Parish in Hatboro, 1978-1983. He also served as an advocate on the metropolitan tribunal from 1979 to 1980 and as associate director of the Office for Youth and Young Adults from 1982 to 1983.
- St. Agnes Parish in West Chester, 1983-1986. He became defender of the bond for the tribunal in 1983.

In 1986, Deliman was named parochial vicar of the Cathedral of SS. Peter and Paul in Philadelphia. Starting in 1991, Deliman served as pastor in the following parishes:

- St. Bonaventure in Philadelphia, 1991-1993
- Visitation B.V.M. in Philadelphia, 1993-2003
- St. Agnes, 2003-2009. He also served as spiritual director at St. Charles Borromeo Seminary from 2001 to 2006 and priest vocation coordinator from 2005 to 2009.
- St. Martin of Tours in Philadelphia, 2009-2011
- Our Lady of Fatima in Bensalem Township, 2011-2014
- Saint Charles Borromeo in Bensalem, 2014-2022

=== Auxiliary bishop of Philadelphia ===
Pope Francis appointed Deliman as an auxiliary bishop of Philadelphia on May 31, 2016. On August 18, 2016, Deliman was consecrated by Archbishop Charles Chaput. As bishop, Deliman oversaw Episcopal Region 2 (Montgomery County) of the archdiocese.

On May 13, 2022, Pope Francis accepted Deliman's resignation as bishop after reaching the mandatory age of 75.

== See also ==
- Catholic Church hierarchy
- Catholic Church in the United States
- Historical list of the Catholic bishops of the United States
- List of Catholic bishops of the United States
- Lists of patriarchs, archbishops, and bishops

Catholic Church titles
Preceded by –	Auxiliary Bishop of Philadelphia; 2016–2022	Succeeded by -
