= Shifo, Shandong =

Shifo 石佛镇
- Town
- Location in Shandong Shifo (China)
- Coordinates: 36°14′12″N 115°51′17″E
- Country: People's Republic of China
- Province: Shandong
- Prefecture-level city: Liaocheng
- County: Yanggu
- Time zone: UTC+8 (China Standard)

Shifo (Chinese: 石佛镇) is a town in Yanggu County, Liaocheng, in western Shandong province, China.
