= Shouzhang =

Shouzhang 寿张镇
- Town
- Location in Shandong Shouzhang (China)
- Coordinates: 36°00′41″N 115°51′05″E
- Country: People's Republic of China
- Province: Shandong
- Prefecture-level city: Liaocheng
- County: Yanggu
- Time zone: UTC+8 (China Standard)

Shouzhang (Chinese: 寿张镇) is a town in Yanggu County, Liaocheng, in western Shandong province, China.
