= Yanlou =

Yanlou 阎楼镇
- Town
- Location in Shandong Yanlou (China)
- Coordinates: 36°07′43″N 115°53′03″E
- Country: People's Republic of China
- Province: Shandong
- Prefecture-level city: Liaocheng
- County: Yanggu
- Time zone: UTC+8 (China Standard)

Yanlou (Chinese: 阎楼镇) is a town in Yanggu County, Liaocheng, in western Shandong province, China.
