= Grgo Ilić =

Bosnian Franciscan friar (1736–1813)

The Most Reverend Grgo Ilić O.F.M.
- Apostolic Vicar of Bosnia Titular Bishop of Ruspe
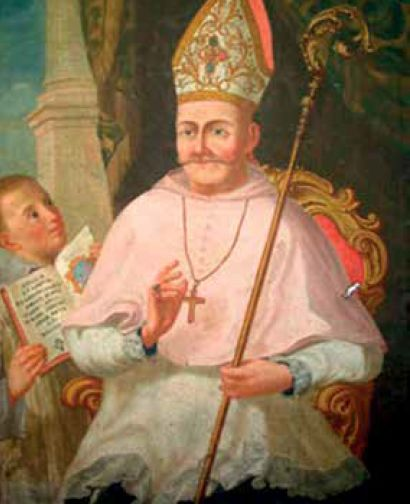
- Fra Grgo Ilić-Varešanin, portrait held at Kreševo monastery is designated national monument of Bosnia and Herzegovina
- Church: Catholic Church
- Diocese: Bosnia
- Appointed: 1 June 1799
- Term ended: 1 March 1813
- Predecessor: Augustin Botoš-Okić
- Successor: Augustin Miletić

Personal details
- Born: 18 October 1736 Vareš, Bosnia Eyalet, Ottoman Empire
- Died: 3 January 1813 (aged 76) Kraljeva Sutjeska, Bosnia Eyalet, Ottoman Empire
- Buried: Friary church, Kraljeva Sutjeska
- Denomination: Catholic

Ordination history
History
Episcopal consecration
- Consecrated by: Fabijan Blašković

Grgo Ilić, also Grgo Ilijić (Gregorius; Higlich, Hilijić-Ilijić, Hilijić-Varešanin, Hiljich de Vares, Varešanin, Ilijić-Varešanin, Zečević), also known as fra Grgo Varešanin (18 October 1736 – 1 March 1813), was a Bosnian Catholic bishop and Franciscan friar. He was born in Vareš, present-day Bosnia and Herzegovina, at the time part of the Ottoman Empire. He served as a provincial of the Franciscan Province of Bosnia for two terms.and as the Apostolic Vicar of Bosnia for life.

== Biography ==
Grgo Ilić was born in Vareš, Ottoman Empire (central part of modern-day Bosnia and Herzegovina). In 1752 he entered the seminary at the Franciscan friary, Kraljeva Sutjeska, and then went to study philosophy and theology in Italy. He returned to Kraljeva Sutjeska to teach novice friars, and became friary guardian. He also served as parish priest in several (parishes) until 1774. He served as a provincial of the Franciscan Province of Bosnia for two terms. Pope Pius VI appointed Ilić to the position of provincial first in 1783, a position he held only for one year from opposition within the provincial electoral plenary council, and then in 1793 for a second term, this time for life. In 1796, Ilijić was named titular bishop of Ruspe and coadjutor apostolic vicar to Augustin Botoš-Okić. In 1798, Ilić became the apostolic vicar of Bosnia, a service he performed for the rest of his life.

On January 3, 1813, at the age of 76, Fra Grgo died in his native Bosnia, in Kraljeva Sutjeska, where he lies buried in Friary church, not far from the town of his birth, Vareš.

== Work influences and impact ==
As a bishop, Ilić wrote and printed many pastoral-catechist works. In Filip Lastrić's work Od’ uzame (Mleci, 1796) he published 14 of its speeches aimed at Bosnian common people: Kratko nadometnuće u’ knjižice Od’ uzame O. fra Filipa iz Oćevje. Tojest XIV. razlikî, ravnî, i kratkî, govorenjah za pùk priprostiti bosanski, a u Cvitu razlika mirisa duhovnoga (Mleci 1802); T. Babića svoja Četeri govorenja ćudoredna. He wrote and printed many of his letters, circulars, and speeches: Epistola pastoralis illmi. et revmi. f. Gregorii a Varess, episcopi Ruspensis (Dubrovnik 1797); Epistola pastoralis cum aliis nonnullis litteris circularibus illustris. et reverendiss. domini fratris Gregorii a Varess, episcopi Ruspensis olim coadjutoris et modo vicarii apostolici in Bosna othomana (Padova 1800); Način pribogoljubni za štovati prisveto uznesenje Marijino na nebo (Dubrovnik 1799). He further printed Nauk krstjanski i druge stvari za znati potrebite (Mleci 1804), while leaving behind in writing a manuscript of Sveta govorenja prieko ciele godine. An important contribution to Bosnian translation is a collection of speeches of archbishop Alessandro Borgia, with whom Ilić closely associated and printed it in Dubrovnik in 1799 under the title Varhu kraljevstva Marijina, govorenja prisv. i pripoš. g. Aleksandra Borgie.

== Legacy ==
The portrait of Bishop Ilić, oil on canvas, 69 x 89 cm, is kept in Franciscan friary St. Catharine in Kreševo, and on 7 July 2003 is declared a National Monument of Bosnia and Herzegovina as movable property by KONS. The portrait shows Bishop Ilić sitting on his cathedra (throne) with an Episcopal crozier in his hand. On his head is a mitre and above his upper lip a mustache. Beside the cathedra is a boy with an open book directed at the bishop. In the book one page shows the Franciscan escutcheon, while the other page shows the inscription: "Homiliae et Concion R. F. Gregor and Vares Aepiscop. Ruzen Vicarii Apost. In Bosnia Argent. Annor. LXVIII A. D. MDCCCIII".

== See also ==
- Religion in Bosnia and Herzegovina
