= Fulgentius of Ruspe =

5th and 6th-century Bishop of Ruspe and saint

Saint Fulgentius of Ruspe
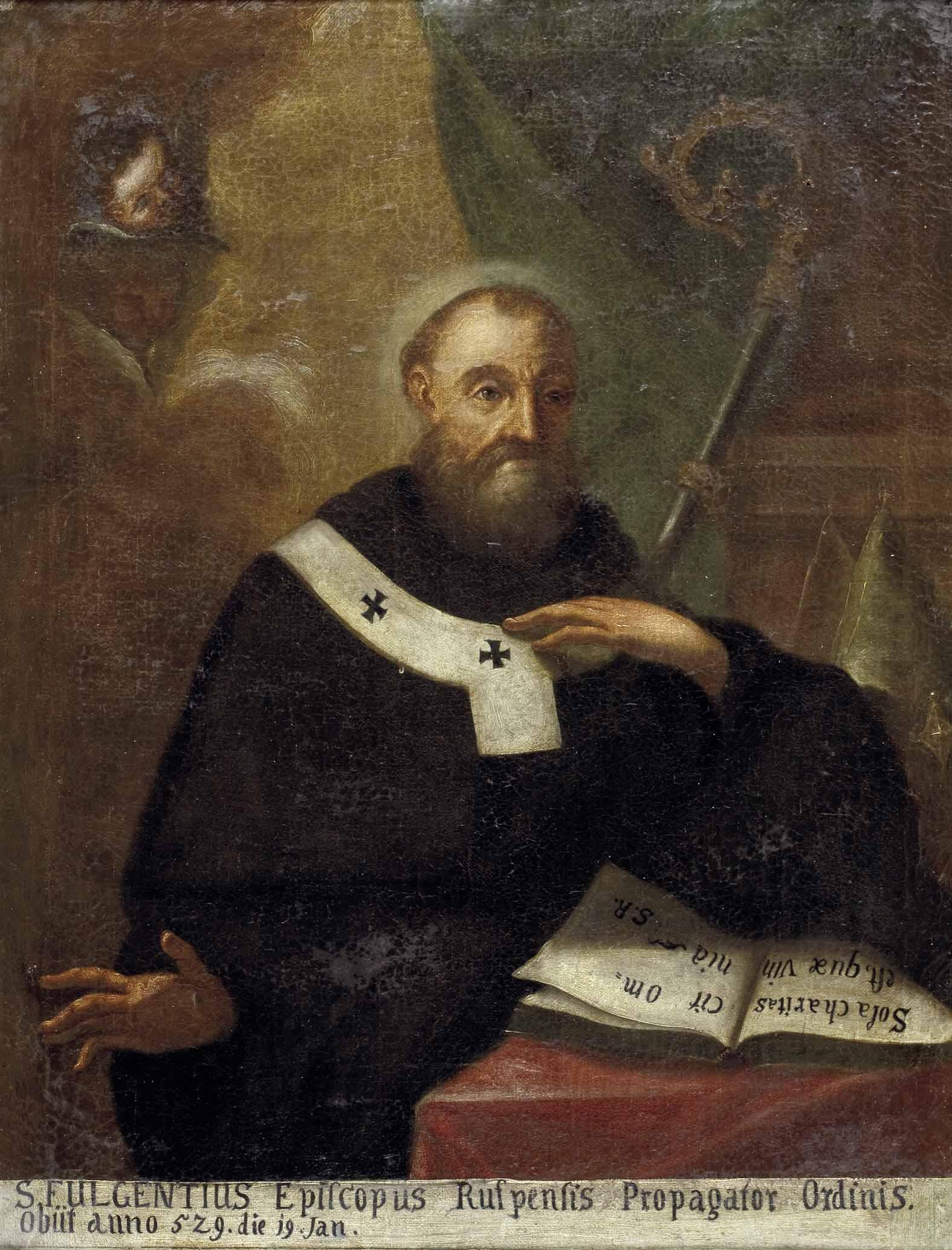
- Saint Fulgentius of Ruspe

Abbot and Bishop
- Born: c. 465; Thelepte, Roman province of Africa
- Died: 1 January, either 527 or 533; Ruspe, Kingdom of the Vandals
- Venerated in: Latin Catholic Church; Eastern Catholic Churches; Eastern Orthodox Church
- Feast: 1 January and 3 January (Augustinian Order)

Fabius Claudius Gordianus Fulgentius, also known as Fulgentius of Ruspe (462 or 467 – 1 January 527 or 533), was a North African Christian prelate who served as Bishop of Ruspe in what is now Tunisia, during the 5th and 6th century. He is venerated as a saint.

== Biography ==
Fabius Claudius Gordianus Fulgentius was born in the year 462 at Telepte (modern-day Medinet-el-Kedima), Tunisia, North Africa, into a senatorial family. His grandfather, Gordianus, a senator of Carthage, was despoiled of his possessions by the invader Genseric, then banished to Italy. His two sons returned after his death; though their house in Carthage had been taken over by Arian priests, they recovered some property in Byzacene.

His father Claudius died when Fulgentius was still quite young. His mother Mariana taught him to speak Greek and Latin. Fulgentius became particularly fluent with the former, speaking it like a native. His biographer says that at an early age Fulgentius committed the entire works of Homer to memory. He quickly gained wide public respect for the conduct of his family's affairs. This reputation helped him to acquire a post as a procurator or tax collector of Byzacena. He soon grew tired of the material life, and this combined with his religious studies, particularly a sermon of Augustine of Hippo on Psalm 36, which dealt with the transitory nature of physical life, convinced him to become a monk.

Around the year 499 he set out to join the hermits of the Thebaid in Egypt, but changed his mind when he learned from Eulalius, Bishop of Syracuse, of the influence of monophysitism on Egyptian monasticism.

He applied to Faustus, a bishop who had been forced from his diocese by the Vandal king Huneric and later set up a monastery at Byzacena. Faustus tried to dissuade Fulgentius because his physical weakness made him a poor candidate for the rigorous life of the monastery. When Fulgentius persisted, Faustus admitted him on a trial basis.

Upon learning of her son's decision, Mariana, who evidently had never been told of Fulgentius's wish, was very upset. She rushed to the gates of the monastery, demanding to know how a church that was supposed to protect widows could deprive her of her only son. Her protestations were ineffective, and Fulgentius was ultimately confirmed in his vocation.

Renewed Arian attacks on the area forced Fulgentius to leave for another nearby monastery. The abbot there, Felix, gave Fulgentius the duty of managing the temporal affairs of the monastery, while he managed the spiritual affairs. The two of them worked well together, and so in 499, during another wave of persecution, they both fled for Sicca Veneria. A local Arian priest had them arrested and tortured after learning the pair were preaching the orthodox Nicene teaching.

In 500, he visited Rome, where he prayed at the tombs of the apostles. His visit coincided with a formal address to the people by king Theodoric, which confirmed Fulgentius in his low esteem for the earthly vanities of this world. He then returned to Byzacena, where he built a monastery, electing to live in an isolated cell. Fulgentius's reputation quickly spread, and he was several times offered the post of bishop of one of the dioceses which had been vacated through the actions of the Arian king Thrasamund. He chose not to accept these offers, knowing Thrasamund had specifically ordered that only Arians be permitted to fill those seats.

== Bishop of Ruspe ==
In 502 Fulgentius was persuaded to take the post of bishop of Ruspe in what is now Tunisia. His obvious virtues made a strong impression on the people of his new diocese, but he was soon banished to Sardinia with some sixty other bishops who did not hold the Arian position. Pope Symmachus knew of their plight and sent them annual provisions of food and money.

While in Sardinia, Fulgentius turned a house in Cagliari into a monastery, and determined to write a number of works to help instruct the Christians of Africa. In 515, he returned to Africa, having been summoned there by Thrasamund for a public debate with his Arian replacement. His book, An Answer to Ten Objections, is supposed to have been collected from the answers he had made regarding objections to the Catholic Nicene position. Thrasamund, impressed by Fulgentius' knowledge and learning, and fearing social discord if these persuasive arguments fell into the hands of his Arian subjects, ordered that all Fulgentius' future statements could only be delivered orally. Fulgentius responded with a further rebuttal to the Arian position, now known as the Three Books to King Thrasamund. Thrasamund's respect for Fulgentius grew, leading him to allow Fulgentius to stay in Carthage, but after renewed complaints from the local Arian clergy he banished Fulgentius back to Sardinia in 520.

Fulgentius founded several communities not only in Africa, but also in Sardinia.

In 523, following the death of Thrasamund and the accession of his Catholic son Hilderic, Fulgentius was allowed to return to Ruspe and try to convert the populace to the Catholic position. He worked to reform many of the abuses which had infiltrated his old diocese in his absence. The power and effectiveness of his preaching was so profound that his archbishop, Boniface of Carthage, wept openly every time he heard Fulgentius preach, and publicly thanked God for giving such a preacher to his church.

Tensions with Quodvultdeus (died c.450) over precedence appear to have been overcome by Fulgentius' modest concessions.

Later, Fulgentius retired to a monastery on the island of Circinia (Kerkenna), but was recalled to Ruspe and served there until his death on 1 January 527 or 533.

== Vita ==
The Life of Fulgentius, (generally attributed to Ferrandus of Carthage, but more recently to Redemptus a monk of Telepte) is of value to historians as a record of migrations of social élites to Italy, Sicily and Sardinia due to vicissitudes of the Vandal rulers in North Africa, navigation in the Western Mediterranean, estate management, and the development of an episcopal monastic familia.

== Writings ==
As a theologian, Fulgentius's work shows knowledge of Greek and a strong agreement with Augustine of Hippo. He wrote frequently against Arianism and Pelagianism. Some letters and eight sermons survive by Fulgentius. During the Middle Ages, he was conflated with Fabius Planciades Fulgentius and considered the author of the famous Mythologies, but this identification is now questioned. Three excerpts of Fulgentius's writing are included in the appendix of Henri Cardinal de Lubac's book, "Catholicism," (French original 1947, recent English edition 1988 Ignatius Press).

== Doctrine ==
=== Filioque ===
Fulgentius writes in his Letter to Peter on the Faith: "Hold most firmly and never doubt that the same Holy Spirit, who is the one Spirit of the Father and the Son, proceeds from the Father and the Son. For the Son says, 'When the Spirit of Truth comes, who has proceeded from the Father,' where he taught that the Spirit is his, because he is the Truth."

Fulgentius makes no clear mention of what will later be Lateran IV's "transubstantiation" (1215). In his Treatise against Fabianus: "Indeed our sharing in the Lord's body and blood when we eat his bread and drink his cup teaches us that we should die to the world." He makes clear that "we eat his bread and drink his cup."

Russian Orthodox Saint, bishop, and theologian, Sylvester Malevansky, defended Fulgentius' pneumatology while providing an Eastern Orthodox interpretation for it.

== Veneration ==
His saint's day is January 1, the day of his death. His relics were transferred to Bouvines in France in 1903.
