= Lin Huiqing (politician) =

Chinese politician

Lin Huiqing (May 1957 -, Chinese: 林蕙青), a female, a native of in Longquan, Zhejiang, and is a political figure and educator in the People's Republic of China.

== Biography ==
Lin Huiqing became a member of the Chinese Communist Party (CCP) in December 1976, graduated from the Department of Public Health at Beijing Medical College (now Peking University School of Medicine) in 1982, and continued to work at the institution. In 1988, she was appointed deputy director of the Department of Medical Education within the Department of Higher Education of the State Education Commission (SEC). In 1993, she advanced to director of the same department. By 1998, she became vice-director of the Department of Higher Education at the Ministry of Education and was subsequently appointed as director of the Department of Higher Education Students and director of the National Center for Information Counseling and Career Guidance for Higher Education Students. In 2006, Director of the Higher Education Student Department at the Ministry of Education. In 2009, she served as a member of the CCP Group of the Ministry of Education and as Assistant to the Minister. In 2015, served as a member of the CCP Group of the Ministry of Education and held the position of Vice-Minister of the Ministry of Education. On January 29, 2019, the State Council dismissed Lin Hui-Qing from his position as Vice-Minister of Education.
