= Fulgentius Ferrandus =

6th century African Church theologian

Fulgentius Ferrandus or Ferrand of Carthage (died 546/547) was a Christian theologian of the Roman province of Africa, modern day Tunisia.

== Biography ==
Little is known of his early life. At the end of his life, he was a deacon of the Church of Carthage, and a renowned theologian, consulted in 546 by the Roman deacons Pelagius and Anatolius on the affair of the Three Chapters which had just broken out. Ferrand's reply was retained, but Facundus of Hermiane, writing in the boreal winter of 546/47 recounts this consultation by referring to Ferrand as " [...] laudabilis in Christo memoriæ Ferrando Carthaginiensi diacono scripserunt". He probably accompanied his master and patron, Fulgentius of Ruspe, to exile in Sardinia, when the bishops of the African Church were banished from their sees by the Arian King of the Vandals, Thrasamund. After the death of Thrasamund and the accession of Hilderic, in 523, the exiles were permitted to return, and Fulgentius, although only a deacon, soon gained a position of great importance in the African Church. He was frequently consulted in regard to the complex theological problems of the time and was known as one of the most redoubtable champions of orthodoxy in Western Christendom.

Through no desire of his own, he was forced to take an active part in the controversy brought about through the condemnation of the Three Chapters by the Emperor Justinian. At the request of Pope Vigilius the Roman deacons Pelagius and Anatolius submitted the questions involved in the emperor's censure of the works of Theodore of Mopsuestia, Theodoret of Cyrus and Ibas of Edessa, to their Carthaginian confrere, requesting him at the same time to lay the matter before the African bishops. Ferrandus at once declared himself in the most emphatic manner against yielding to the schemes of the emperor (Ep. vi, ad Pelagium et Anatolium diaconos). His decision met with the approval of Rusticus, Archbishop of Carthage, and was subsequently ratified by the council of African bishops over which Rusticus presided, and in which it was agreed to sever all relations with Pope Vigilius. Ferrandus died shortly after this event and before the Second Council of Constantinople was convened in 553.

== Writings ==
His works are mostly of a doctrinal character. He defended the Trinitarian doctrines against the Arians and dealt besides with the question of the two natures in Christ, with baptism, and with the Eucharist. He drew up a "Breviatio Canonum Ecclesiasticorum" in which he summarized in two hundred and thirty-two canons the teaching of the earliest ecumenical councils concerning the manner of life of bishops, priests, deacons and other ecclesiastics, and of the conduct to be observed towards Jews, pagans and heretics.

He also wrote at the request of the Comes Reginus (who was probably military governor of North Africa) a treatise on the Christian rule of life for soldiers, in which he laid down seven rules which he explained and inculcated and gave evidence of his piety and practical wisdom.

=== Life of Fulgence of Ruspe ===
Since Pierre Pithou wrote in 1588 he was generally considered the author of the Life of Fulgence of Ruspe. However, this attribution is not based on any indication of the many manuscripts. Two letters of Ferrand about Fulgence are preserved, where he questions him on points of religion, and there are corresponding answers from Fulgence. At the end of a letter to the Abbe Eugippe, written just after the death of Fulgence ( 532 ), Ferrand evokes the projected drafting of a Life, but without positively saying the author. But one of the last editors of the text, Antonino Isola, casts doubt on his authorship to the point of talking about "Pseudo-Ferrand". and choosing to nominate Redemptus a monk of Telepte as the author.

The prologue of the Life mentions that the author lives in the little monastery which Bishop Fulgence had founded during his relegation to Sardinia; this, therefore, may or may not describe Ferrand.

=== Letters ===
Also Ferrand preserves seven letters transmitted in bulk: the two by which he interrogates Fulgence de Ruspe (the first on the question of whether an Ethiopian catechumen, died while administered baptism, was saved, the second on dogma Of the Trinity and the question of whether the divinity of Christ suffered on the cross), and five others, some very long, which are true little treatises on theology (notably the answer to the deacons Pelagius and Anatolius on the Three Chapters, by which he pronounced against the edict of Justinian, or the very long letter to Count Reginus on the duties of a Christian officer, presented in the form of seven rules. The letter to Eugippe, formerly known in a truncated version (still reproduced in PL ), was published for the first time in its integral version in 1828 by Cardinal Angelo Mai, according to a manuscript of Mount Cassin.

On the other hand, Ferrand is the author of the Breviatio canonum ecclesiasticorum, a collection of 232 canons enacted by the oldest Greek and African councils, first published by Pierre Pithou.

== See also ==
- Patrologia Latina, LXVII - his writings
