= Yanggu, Shandong =

Yanggu 阳谷县 Yangku
- County
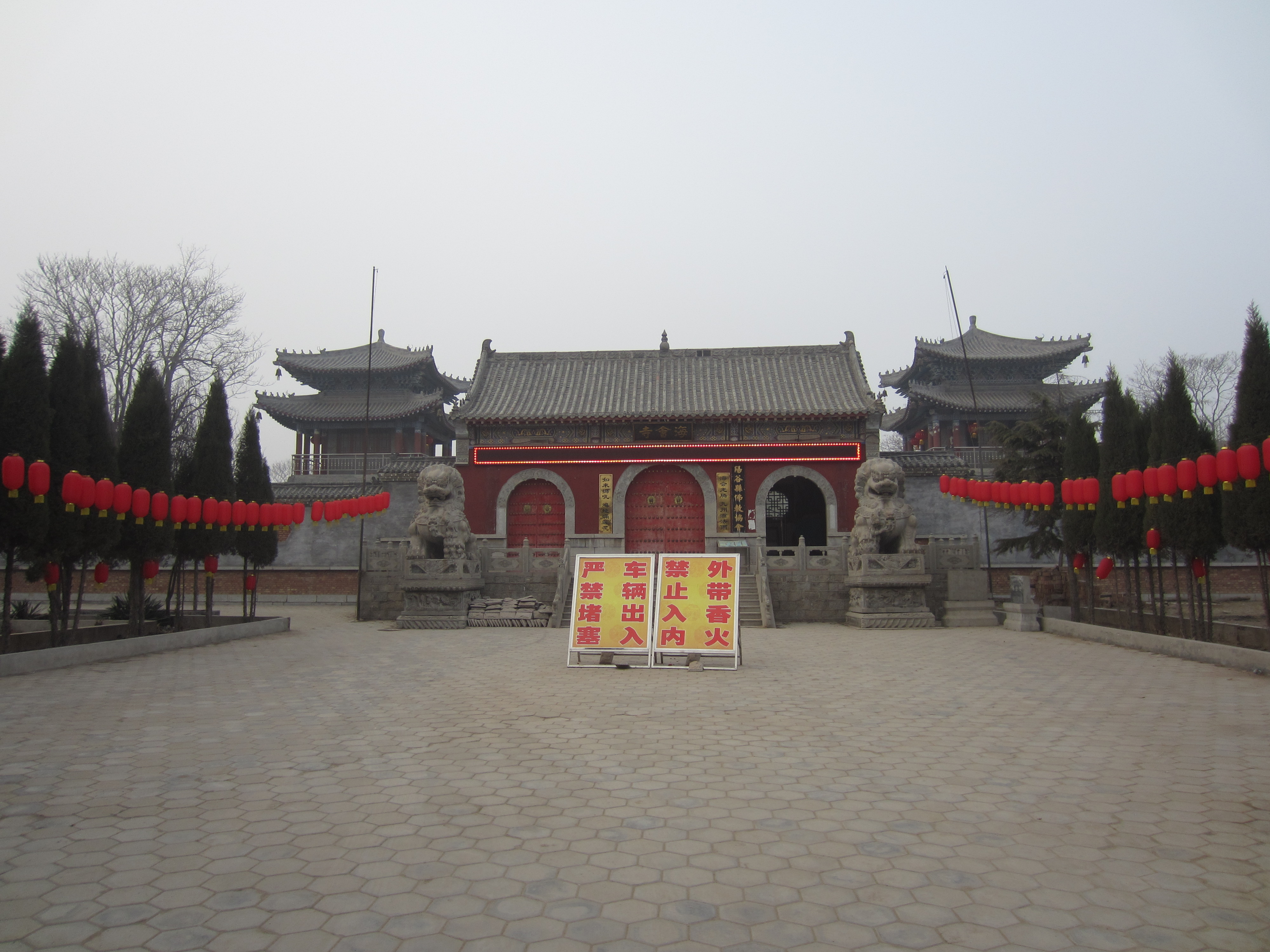
- Haihui Temple

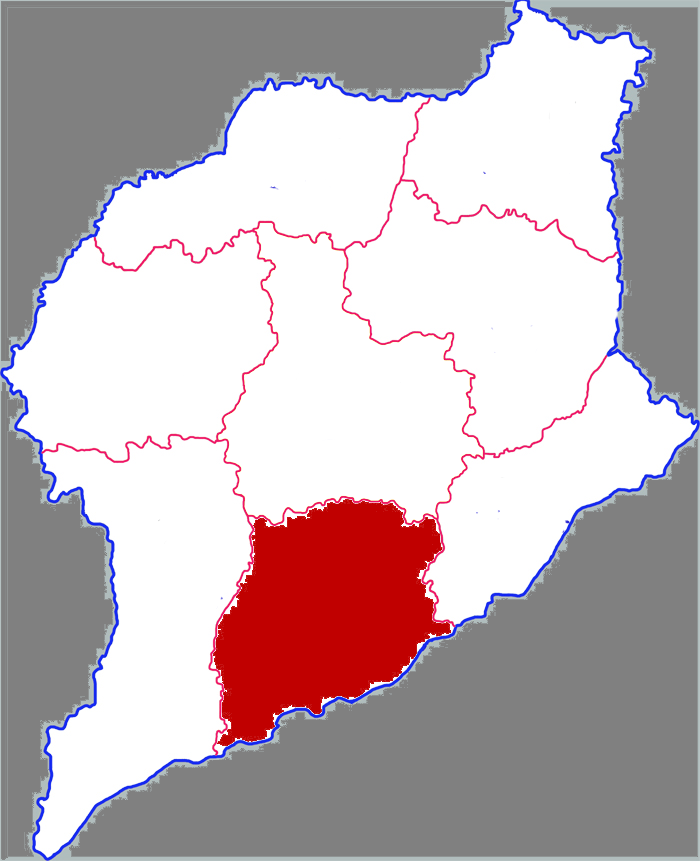
- Yanggu in Liaocheng

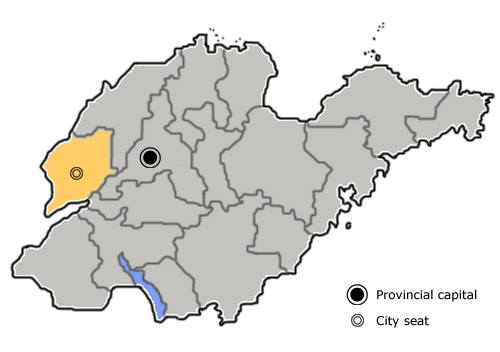
- Liaocheng in Shandong
- Coordinates: 36°06′50″N 115°47′31″E
- Country: People's Republic of China
- Province: Shandong
- Prefecture-level city: Liaocheng

Area
  - Total: 1,066 km^{2} (412 sq mi)

Population (2019)
  - Total: 800,600
  - Density: 751.0/km^{2} (1,945/sq mi)
- Time zone: UTC+8 (China Standard)
- Postal Code: 252300

Yanggu County (simplified Chinese: 阳谷县; traditional Chinese: 陽穀縣; pinyin: Yánggǔ Xiàn) is a county of western Shandong province, People's Republic of China, bordering the narrow strip of Henan province to the south. It is administered by the prefecture-level city of Liaocheng.

The population was 748,818 in 1999.

== Administrative divisions ==
As of 2012, this county is divided to 3 subdistricts, 10 towns and 5 townships.

Subdistricts

- Bojiqiao Subdistrict (博济桥街道)
- Qiaorun Subdistrict (侨润街道)
- Shizilou Subdistrict (狮子楼街道)

Towns

- Yanlou (阎楼镇)
- Echeng (阿城镇)
- Qiji (七级镇)
- Anle (安乐镇)
- Dingshui (定水镇)
- Shifo (石佛镇)
- Litai (李台镇)
- Shouzhang (寿张镇)
- Shiwuliyuan (十五里园镇)
- Zhangqiu (张秋镇)

Townships

- Guodiantun Township (郭店屯乡)
- Dabu Township (大布乡)
- Xihu Township (西湖乡)
- Gaomiaowang Township (高庙王乡)
- Jindouying Township (金斗营乡)

== Climate ==
Climate data for Yanggu, elevation 41 m (135 ft), (1991–2020 normals, extremes 1981–2010)
Month	Jan	Feb	Mar	Apr	May	Jun	Jul	Aug	Sep	Oct	Nov	Dec	Year
Record high °C (°F)	15.7 (60.3)	22.9 (73.2)	29.0 (84.2)	33.7 (92.7)	36.8 (98.2)	40.7 (105.3)	41.7 (107.1)	36.1 (97.0)	36.9 (98.4)	33.7 (92.7)	26.5 (79.7)	19.7 (67.5)	41.7 (107.1)
Mean daily maximum °C (°F)	4.1 (39.4)	8.3 (46.9)	14.6 (58.3)	20.9 (69.6)	26.4 (79.5)	31.7 (89.1)	31.9 (89.4)	30.4 (86.7)	27.0 (80.6)	21.3 (70.3)	12.7 (54.9)	5.8 (42.4)	19.6 (67.3)
Daily mean °C (°F)	−1.2 (29.8)	2.5 (36.5)	8.6 (47.5)	14.9 (58.8)	20.6 (69.1)	25.7 (78.3)	27.2 (81.0)	25.6 (78.1)	21.0 (69.8)	15.1 (59.2)	7.1 (44.8)	0.7 (33.3)	14.0 (57.2)
Mean daily minimum °C (°F)	−5.3 (22.5)	−2.1 (28.2)	3.4 (38.1)	9.4 (48.9)	14.9 (58.8)	20.2 (68.4)	23.1 (73.6)	21.7 (71.1)	16.3 (61.3)	10.0 (50.0)	2.6 (36.7)	−3.4 (25.9)	9.2 (48.6)
Record low °C (°F)	−18.9 (−2.0)	−16.4 (2.5)	−9.4 (15.1)	−2.2 (28.0)	2.6 (36.7)	9.3 (48.7)	16.2 (61.2)	11.9 (53.4)	4.1 (39.4)	−2.6 (27.3)	−16.5 (2.3)	−16.5 (2.3)	−18.9 (−2.0)
Average precipitation mm (inches)	3.9 (0.15)	8.9 (0.35)	11.8 (0.46)	29.6 (1.17)	55.3 (2.18)	62.8 (2.47)	139.1 (5.48)	127.6 (5.02)	54.5 (2.15)	29.2 (1.15)	20.5 (0.81)	6.3 (0.25)	549.5 (21.64)
Average precipitation days (≥ 0.1 mm)	2.2	3.4	3.5	4.8	6.2	7.5	11.1	9.3	6.8	5.3	4.4	2.5	67
Average snowy days	2.9	3.0	0.9	0.2	0	0	0	0	0	0	0.9	2.2	10.1
Average relative humidity (%)	63	59	57	63	67	64	79	84	77	70	69	67	68
Mean monthly sunshine hours	137.2	149.8	201.6	222.4	247.3	224.8	193.5	188.9	181.3	177.6	150.2	137.8	2,212.4
Percentage possible sunshine	44	48	54	56	57	52	44	46	49	51	49	46	50
Source: China Meteorological Administration
