= Dingshui =

Dingshui 定水镇
- Town
- Location in Shandong Dingshui (China)
- Coordinates: 36°15′18″N 115°49′19″E
- Country: People's Republic of China
- Province: Shandong
- Prefecture-level city: Liaocheng
- County: Yanggu
- Time zone: UTC+8 (China Standard)

Dingshui (Chinese: 定水镇) is a town in Yanggu County, Liaocheng, in western Shandong, China.
