= Diocese of Funing =

Roman Catholic diocese in China

Coordinates: 26°57′N 119°58′E

Diocese of Funing Dioecesis Funimensis 天主教福宁教区

Location
- Country: China
- Territory: Ningde (except Pingnan County and Gutian County)
- Ecclesiastical province: Fuzhou
- Metropolitan: Fuzhou

Statistics
- Area: 10,000 km^{2} (3,900 sq mi)
- Population: Total; Catholics: (as of 1948); 1,000,000; 26,783 (2.7%)

Information
- Rite: Latin Rite

Current leadership
- Pope: Leo XIV
- Bishop: Vincent Zhan Silu
- Metropolitan Archbishop: Peter Lin Jiashan

The Roman Catholic Diocese of Funing/Xiapu (Latin: Funimen(sis), simplified Chinese: 福宁 / 霞浦; traditional Chinese: 福寧 /霞浦; pinyin: Fúníng / Xiápǔ) is a diocese located in the municipal region of Ningde (formerly Funing), in the ecclesiastical province of Fuzhou, centered in the Chinese province of Fujian.

== History ==
- December 27, 1923: Established as Apostolic Vicariate of Funingfu (福寧府) from the Apostolic Vicariate of Northern Fo-kien (福建北境)
- April 11, 1946: Promoted as Diocese of Funing

== Leadership ==
- Bishops of Funing (Roman rite)
  - Bishop Thomas Niu Huiqing (牛會卿) (Apostolic Administrator 1948–February 28, 1973)
  - Archbishop Theodore Labrador Fraile, O.P. (趙炳文) (April 11, 1946–May 6, 1980)
- Vicars Apostolic of Funingfu (福寧府) (Roman Rite)
  - Bishop Theodore Labrador Fraile, O.P. (later Archbishop) (May 18, 1926–April 11, 1946)
