= Thomas Niu Huiqing =

Chinese Catholic priest

- Bishop of the Roman Catholic Diocese of Funing
- Church: St Dominic's Cathedral
- Archdiocese: Roman Catholic Archdiocese of Fuzhou
- Diocese: Roman Catholic Diocese of Funing
- Installed: 1948
- Term ended: 1973

Orders
- Ordination: 1923

Personal details
- Born: September 18, 1895 Xinhe County, Hebei, Qing Empire
- Died: February 28, 1973 (aged 77) Chiayi, Taiwan, Republic of China
- Denomination: Roman Catholic
- Coat of arms

Thomas Niu Huiqing (simplified Chinese: 牛会卿; traditional Chinese: 牛會卿; pinyin: Niú Huìqīng; 18 September 1895 - 28 February 1973) was a Chinese Catholic priest and bishops of the Roman Catholic Diocese of Funing and Yanggu.

== Biography ==
Niu was born in Xinhe County, Hebei, on September 18, 1895, during the late Qing dynasty (1644–1911). He was ordained a priest on September 30, 1923. On January 12, 1943, he was appointed Apostolic vicariate of the Roman Catholic Diocese of Yanggu in Shandong, and ordained titular bishop on April 4 of that year. When Yanggu became diocese in 1946, he became its first ordained bishop. He left Yanggu during the Chinese Civil War and went to Funing in Fujian in 1948. Later he was appointed Apostolic Administrator of the Roman Catholic Diocese of Chiayi in Taiwan in 1958. He died on February 28, 1973.

Catholic Church titles
Previous: Thomas Tien Ken-sin	Apostolic vicariate of the Roman Catholic Diocese of Yanggu; 1943–1946	Next: Himself (Bishop)
Previous: Position established	Bishop of the Roman Catholic Diocese of Funing; 1948–1973	Next: Theodore Labrador Fraile (赵炳文)
Previous: Position established	Apostolic Administrator of the Roman Catholic Diocese of Chiayi; 1952–1969	Next: Paul Ch'eng Shih-kuang
