= Vareš =

- Town and municipality
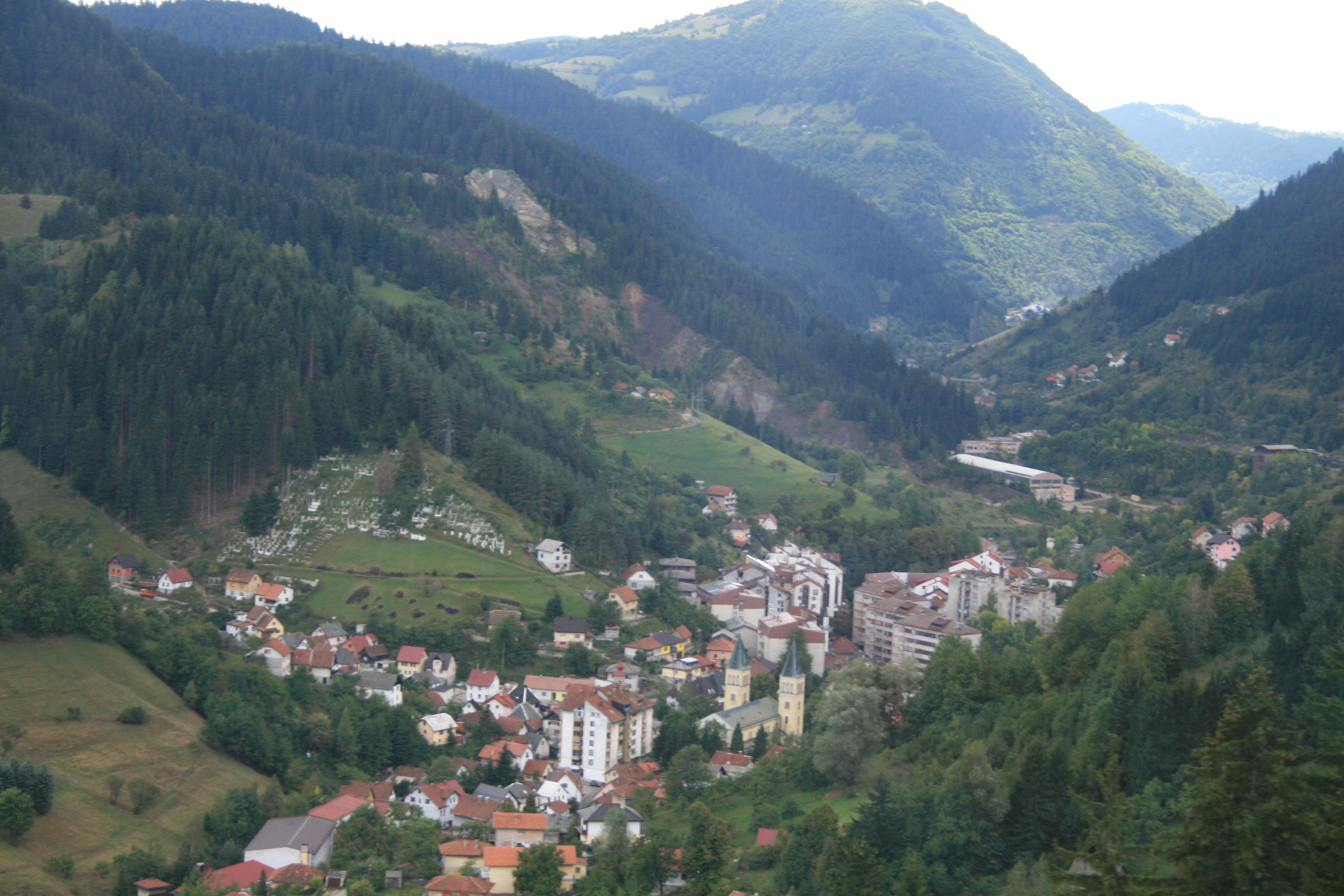
- View on Vareš

- Coat of arms

- Location of Vareš within Bosnia and Herzegovina
- Coordinates: 44°09′43″N 18°19′37″E
- Country: Bosnia and Herzegovina
- Entity: Federation of Bosnia and Herzegovina
- Canton: Zenica-Doboj

Government
  - Municipal mayor: Malik Rizvanović (SDA)

Area
  - Town and municipality: 390.1 km^{2} (150.6 sq mi)

Population (2013 census)
  - Town and municipality: 8,892
  - Density: 22.79/km^{2} (59.04/sq mi)
  - Urban: 2,917
- Time zone: UTC+1 (CET)
  - Summer (DST): UTC+2 (CEST)
- Area code: +387 32
- Website: www.vares.info

Vareš (Serbian Cyrillic: Вареш) is a town and municipality located in Zenica-Doboj Canton of the Federation of Bosnia and Herzegovina, an entity of Bosnia and Herzegovina. It is situated in central Bosnia and Herzegovina, and is famous for the local mining activities and production of iron. As of 2013, it has a population of 8,892 inhabitants, with 2,917 in the town itself.

== Geography ==
Vareš is a mountainous town located 45 km from Sarajevo in the valley of the small Stavnja River, 828 m above sea level, surrounded by the massive high Kapija, Stijene, Zvijezda, and Perun Mountains, named after Perun / Перун, the highest god of the Slavic pantheon (Perkūnas/Perkons).

== History ==
=== Early history ===
The town of Vareš has a long history with remains of metallurgical activities dating back to Bronze Age. Also during the Roman era, the town was famous for its miners and smiths.

=== Middle ages ===
During Middle Ages the Bosnian kings had their center in close proximity to the modern city of Vareš.

=== Medieval ===
The remains of the medieval royal city and castle Bobovac were recently proclaimed as national monuments, as was the Catholic Church of St. Michael in the town of Vareš. The oldest preserved Catholic church in Bosnia can be found in the town, built in the early 17th century. The town was earlier dominated by the Catholic population. The church books are among the oldest preserved in Bosnia and date back to 1643.

=== Austro-Hungarian Empire ===
During the Austrian rule of Bosnia and Herzegovina, the ironworks of Vareš were an important exporter of various iron products to the rest of the Habsburg empire. In 1891, the first blast furnace in Bosnia and Herzegovina was built. That blast furnace still exists, but it ceased its operations in 1990.

=== World War II ===
During World War II, following the invasion and occupation of Yugoslavia, Vareš was incorporated into the fascist puppet Independent State of Croatia (NDH), and controlled by the Croatian Ustashe quislings, as an important mining center whose natural resources, mainly iron ore, was exploited to support the NDH war efforts. In April 1945, the town was eventually liberated by the Yugoslav Partisans, and became a part of the Socialist Federal Republic of Yugoslavia.

=== Bosnian War (1992–95) ===
In April 1992, the Bosnian War began and lasted until December 1995. The town of Vareš had 12,000 residents at the time, with Croats being the small majority. Since the first democratic elections in 1991 until October 1993, the municipality was governed by the Social Democratic Party of Bosnia and Herzegovina, non-ethnic party, while the town's and municipality territory was under joint Croatian Defence Council (HVO) and the Army of the Republic of Bosnia and Herzegovina (ARBiH) control since the war begun. Despite the outbreak of the Croat-Bosniak War, the relations between the local HVO and the ARBiH units remained relatively good until the summer of 1993. As a consequence of broader conflict deepening between Croats and Bosniaks, especially in Central Bosnia, the ARBiH overran the HVO in nearby Kakanj, resulting in a few thousand Croat refugees settling in Vareš. In October, the local HVO, supported by HDZ and structures of Herceg-Bosna, took full control of the town, while most of the Bosniak population had been forced to leave or flee. On 23 October, dozens of Bosniaks were killed by the HVO in the Stupni Do massacre. Following the massacre, ARBiH attacked the Vareš enclave and captured the town in early November. Most of the Croat and some Serb population fled through the Serb lines to Kiseljak and Kreševo, while the town was looted after its capture. The remaining HVO units took hold in the village of Daštansko, where they remained until the Dayton Agreement was signed in November 1995.

== Mining ==
The Vareš region has a long history of mining, particularly in iron ore, lead, zinc, and silver. Modern industrial mining activity was revitalized in the early 2020s with the development of the Vareš Silver Project, a major polymetallic mining operation originally established by the British-Australian company Adriatic Metals Plc.

In September 2025, Dundee Precious Metals Inc completed the acquisition of Adriatic Metals, including full ownership of the Vareš Silver Project. The transaction, valued at approximately US$1.3 billion, transferred all mining and processing operations to DPM. The company announced plans to expand exploration activities, extend the operational lifespan of the mine, and upgrade site infrastructure.

The Vareš Silver Project is regarded as one of the most significant new polymetallic mines in Europe and continues to play a central role in the contemporary economic development of the municipality.

In 2026, hundreds of people tested positive for lead exposure, and four environmental agencies filed criminal charges against Dundee Precious Metals.

== Culture and heritage ==
The town is rich with archeological findings from different epochs – in several surrounding locations are found remains of the prehistoric period, such as copper artifacts in Brgule.

In the town center itself, there is the Old Stone Bridge that resembles the majority of one-arched bridges from Ottoman period. This bridge is considered to be similar to the building method of the Old Bridge in Mostar. The bridge is currently on the KONS Petition list for inscription on the List of National Monuments of Bosnia and Herzegovina.

== Demographics ==
According to the 2013 census results, it has a population of 8,892 inhabitants. Population decline is evident since the end of the Bosnian War, as nearly two-thirds of the population from 1991 left Vareš in only twenty years.

Historical population
| Year | Pop. | ±% p.a. |
|---|---|---|
| 1971 | 23,532 | — |
| 1991 | 22,203 | −0.29% |
| 2013 | 8,892 | −4.07% |

=== Ethnic composition ===
Ethnic composition – Vareš town
| | 2013 | 1991 | 1971 |
| Bosniaks | 1,339 (45.9%) | 1,068 (18.13%) | (-) |
| Croats | 1,254 (43%) | 3,035 (51.54%) | (-) |
| Serbs | 71 (2.4%) | 627 (10,64%) | (-) |
| Yugoslavs | (-) | 859 (14.58%) | (-) |
| Others | 253 (8.7%) | 299 (5.07%) | (-) |
| Total | 2,917 (100,0%) | 5,888 (100,0%) | (-) |

Ethnic composition – Vareš municipality
| | 2013 | 1991 | 1971 |
| Bosniaks | 5,447 (61.3%) | 6,714 (30.24%) | 6,631 (28.18%) |
| Croats | 2,820 (31.7%) | 9,016 (40.61%) | 11,134 (47.33%) |
| Serbs | 189 (2.1%) | 3,644 (16.41%) | 5,166 (21.96%) |
| Yugoslavs | (-) | 2,071 (9.32%) | 307 (1.30%) |
| Others | 436 (4.9%) | 758 (3.44%) | 285 (1.23%) |
| Total | 8,892 (100,0%) | 22,203 (100,0%) | 23,523 (100,0%) |

== Settlements ==
Aside from the town of Vareš, the municipality includes the following settlements:

- Bijelo Borje
- Blaža
- Borovica Donja
- Borovica Gornja
- Borovičke Njive
- Brda* Brezik
- Brgule
- Budoželje
- Čamovine
- Ćeće
- Dabravine
- Daštansko
- Debela Međa
- Diknjići
- Dragovići
- Draževići
- Duboštica
- Hodžići
- Ivančevo
- Javornik
- Kadarići
- Karići
- Kokoščići
- Kolovići
- Kopališta
- Kopijari
- Krčevine
- Kunosići
- Letevci
- Ligatići
- Luke
- Ljepovići
- Mijakovići
- Mir
- Mižnović
- Mlakve
- Naseoci
- Neprivaj
- Oćevija
- Okruglica
- Orah
- Osoje
- Osredak
- Ostrlja
- Pajtov Han
- Pajtovići
- Planinica
- Pobilje
- Podjavor
- Pogar
- Položac
- Poljanice
- Pomenići
- Pržići
- Pržići Kolonija
- Radonjići
- Radoševići
- Ravne
- Rokoč
- Samari
- Semizova Ponikva
- Seoci
- Sjenokos
- Slavin
- Sršljenci
- Strica
- Striježevo
- Stupni Do
- Šikulje
- Tisovci
- Toljenak
- Tribija
- Vareš Majdan
- Vijaka Donja
- Vijaka Gornja
- Višnjići
- Zabrezje
- Zaruđe
- Zubeta
- Zvijezda,
- Žalja i Žižci

== Notable people ==
- Borislav Stjepanović, actor
- Ipe Ivandić, musician
- Milo Cipra, music composer
- Slaven Stjepanović, footballer
- Željko Ivanković, poet and writer
- Matija Divković, Bosnian Franciscan writer
- fra Grgo Ilić - Varešanin (1736–1813), Franciscan friar and bishop, served as provincial minister and apostolic vicar
- Grigorije Durić, Serbian orthodox bishop
- Kenan Kamenjaš, Bosnian basketball player
