= Samu =

Samu or SAMU may refer to:

== Places ==
- Samu, Sierra Leone
- Samu, South Khorasan, a village in South Khorasan Province, Iran
- As-Samu, a town in the Hebron Governorate of the West Bank
- Samu, Sarawak, Malaysia, a settlement near Kerangan Pinggai
- SAMU, the ICAO code of Uspallata Airport, Mendoza, Argentina

== People ==
- Samu (surname)
- Samu (given name)
- Samu Aghehowa, Spanish footballer
- Samu (footballer, born 1996), Portuguese football midfielder
- Samu (footballer, born 1999), Portuguese football goalkeeper
- Samu (wrestler) (born 1963), Samoan-American professional wrestler

== Ambulance and medical organizations ==
- SAMU Social, a municipal humanitarian emergency service in several cities in France and worldwide
- Service d'Aide Médicale Urgente, see Emergency medical services in France
- Servicio de Atencion Medica Urgente, a specialised emergency system of Madrid; see S.A.M.U.R.
- Serviço de Atendimento Móvel de Urgência, Brazil's urgent mobile care service
- SAMU, the Southern Africa Medical Unit of Médecins Sans Frontières (Doctors Without Borders)

== Other uses ==
- Samu (fossil), nickname for an archaic human fossil found in Vértesszőlős, Hungary
- Samu (Zen), work that encourages mindfulness, practiced in Zen
- Samu language, a Lolo–Burmese language native to Yunnan Province, Southwest China
- Samu, a short name for Bengali blogging website Somewhere in... blog
