= Samu (given name) =

Samu is a given name of various origins, often derived from Samuel.

Notable people with this given name include:

- Samu Balázs (1906–1981), Hungarian actor
- Samu Bola (born 1983), Fijian rugby union player
- Samu Fóti (1890–1916), Hungarian gymnast
- Samu Haber (born 1976), Finnish singer and songwriter
- Samu Hazai (1851–1942), Hungarian military officer and politician
- Samu Heikkilä (born 1971), Finnish film editor
- Samu Isosalo (born 1981), Finnish ice hockey player
- Samu Kerevi (born 1993), Fijian-Australian rugby union player
- Samu Manoa (born 1985), American rugby union player
- Samu Nieminen (born 1992), Finnish association football player
- Samu Pecz (1854–1922), Hungarian architect and academic
- Samu Sunim (1941–2022), Korean Buddhist monk
- Samu Valelala, Fijian rugby league player
- Samu Vilkman, Finnish ice hockey player
- Samu Wara (born 1986), Australian rugby union footballer
- Samu (footballer) (born 1996), Portuguese footballer
- Samú (born 2000), Portuguese footballer

== See also ==
- Samuel (name)
- Samu (surname)
- Samu (disambiguation)
