= Simu =

Simu may refer to:

- Sīmu or Samu, village in South Khorasan Province, Iran

== People with the name ==
- Simu Liu (born 1989), Chinese-born Canadian actor
- Anastase Simu (1854–1935), Romanian art collector
- Ioan Simu (1875–1948), Romanian priest and politician
- Margareta Simu (born 1953), Swedish racewalker
