= Samoo =

Samooo or SAMOO may refer to:

- Samoo Architects & Engineers
- Samoo, South Khorasan, a village in South Khorasan Province, Iran
