= Samu (surname) =

Samu is a surname. Notable people with this surname include:

- Anna Samu (born 1996), Hungarian football player
- Géza Samu (1947–1990), Hungarian sculptor
- Margaret Samu, art historian
- Pete Samu (born 1991), Australian rugby union player

== See also ==
- Samu (given name)
- Samu (disambiguation)
