= Emergency medical services in Spain =

Emergency Medical Services in Spain (Servicios de Emergencias Médicas, SEM) (EMS) are public services usually provided by regional Governments.

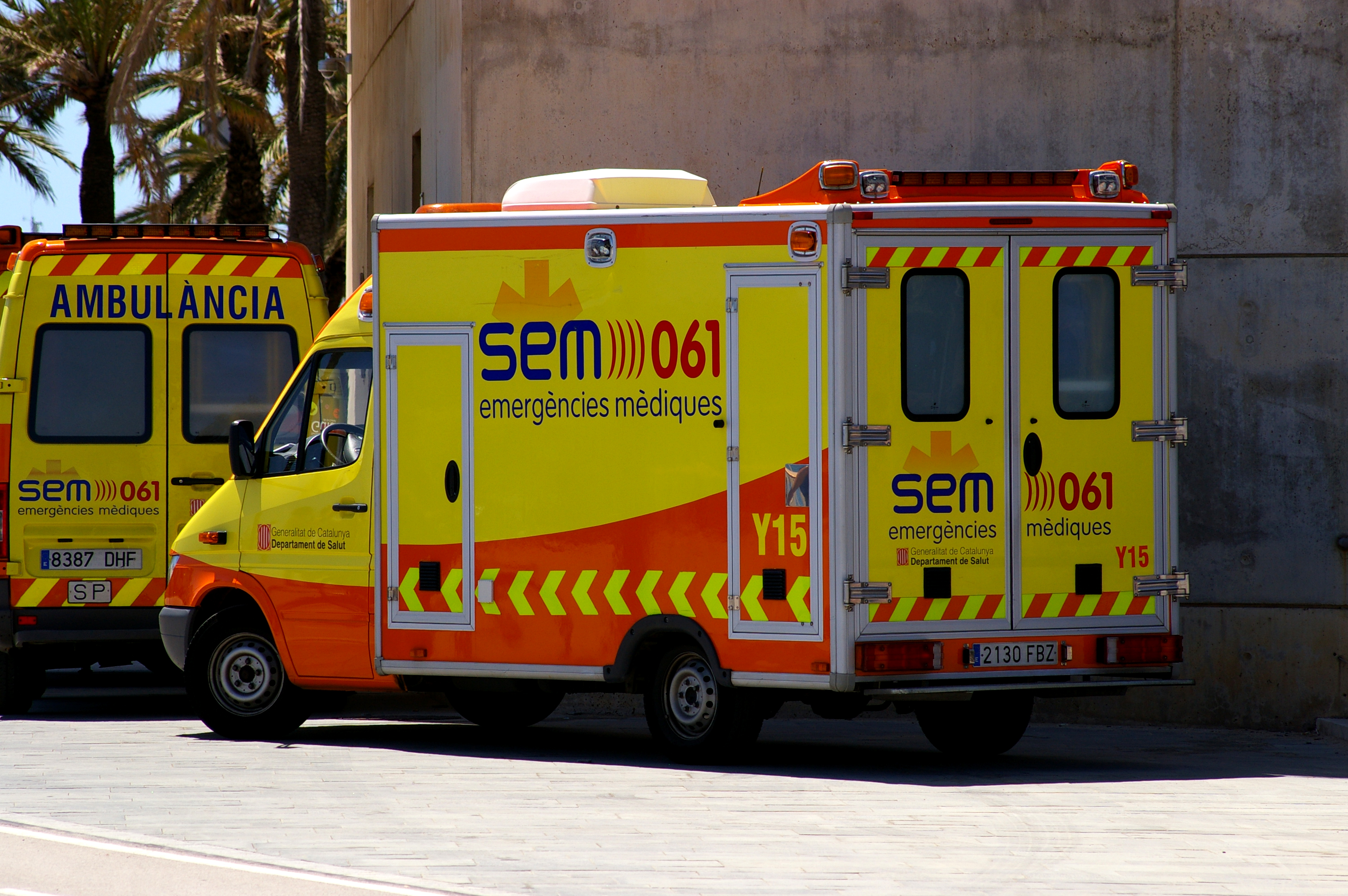
Catalonia EMS. ALS Ambulance

== Organization ==
Spanish organization for medical emergencies is a Public Health Integrated EMS (IEMS) that has a network of SAMU/IEMS Medical Emergency Regulation Centers (MERC = SAMU in international appellation). Emergency Primary Care and GP are fully integrated in Spanish IEMS.

Autonomous Communities (regions) of Spain

Spain has 17 autonomous communities with 17 regional Health Departments. The National Health System is the agglomeration of these 17 Health Departments. So each autonomous community has its own regional IEMS that depend on Regional Health Department. Some EMS have their own staff and vehicles, others outsource the vehicles and staff to private companies. Public EMS departments usually outsource the vehicles and BLS staff. ALS staff are usually government employees.

In addition, some cities have local EMS too (e.g. SAMUR-Madrid).

There are also Emergency Medical Services in some fire departments: cities of Barcelona, Sevilla, Valencia, Zaragoza, Malaga, Bilbao, and Catalonia community. In these EMS, doctors and nurses work with firefighters in advanced life support (ALS) ambulances or helicopters.

Furthermore, non-profit organizations (Spanish Red Cross, DYA) and Civil Defense Groups provide ambulances (usually BLS) with volunteers for some situations (disasters, mass incidents, special events: sports, concerts,...)

== Standards ==
=== National Minimum Staff Requirements ===
New legislation was published in June 2012.

Type	Old Royal Decree 619/1998	New Royal Decree 836/2012	Comments
Type A: Patient Transport Ambulance	A driver and an assistant(*), when the type of service so requires	A driver (and an assistant when the type of service so requires), both with a PCP(**) (Professional Certificate of Proficiency for Emergency Technicians)	(*)Before the new legislation was enacted each region had their own training requirements for drivers and assistants: Courses from 60 to 600 hours (TTS, ATA, TEM, first aid courses...) (**)This is a certificate for employees who worked before the development of the new national qualification of EMT-B (TES)
Type B: BLS Ambulance (Basic Life Support Ambulance)	A driver and at least one other person with appropriate training(*)	2 EMT-B (TES), one of them a driver	(*)Before the new legislation was enacted each region had their own training requirements for drivers and technicians: Courses from 60 to 600 hours (TTS, ATA, TEM...)
Type C: ALS Ambulance (Advanced Life Support Ambulance)	A driver, an emergency physician and an emergency nurse	An EMT-B/driver and an emergency nurse (and a physician when the type of service so requires)	

=== Usual types of ambulances and their staff ===
Spanish EMS is a physician led system with physicians, emergency nurses and technicians in the field. It's a two-tiered response system (Advanced Life Support with physicians and nurses, and Basic Life Support with technicians).

Staff
Type	Spanish term	Physician	Emergency Nurse	EMT (driver included)	Comments
ALS Ambulance (Advanced Life Support Ambulance or Mobile ICU)	Ambulancia de SVA (Soporte Vital Avanzado) / UVI móvil	1	1	1-2	-
ALS/ALSn Ambulance (Advanced Life Support -nursing- Ambulance)	Ambulancia SVAE (Soporte Vital Avanzado Enfermero) / SVE	0	1	1-2	Growing resources/available in most regions (Catalonia, Canary Islands, Basque Country, Castile-La Mancha, Castile and Leon, Aragon, Andalusia and Madrid
BLS Ambulance (Basic Life Support Ambulance)	Ambulancia de SVB	0	0	2 (sometimes 3)	-
Non-Caring Ambulance	Ambulancia no-asistencial	0	0	1-2	EMT-B certificate or Professional Certificate of Proficiency for emergency technicians is mandatory since June 2012
HEMS (Helicopter Emergency Medical Service)	Helicóptero de Emergencias Médicas	1	1	0 (sometimes 1)	+1 or 2 pilots

In addition there are fast vehicles (non-ambulance) for emergency interventions:

- RRU (Rapid Response Units / VIR: Vehículo de Intervención Rápida), staffed by a driver/technician and a physician (sometimes an emergency nurse).
- Logistics and communications vehicles for disasters.
Spanish EMS Ambulances

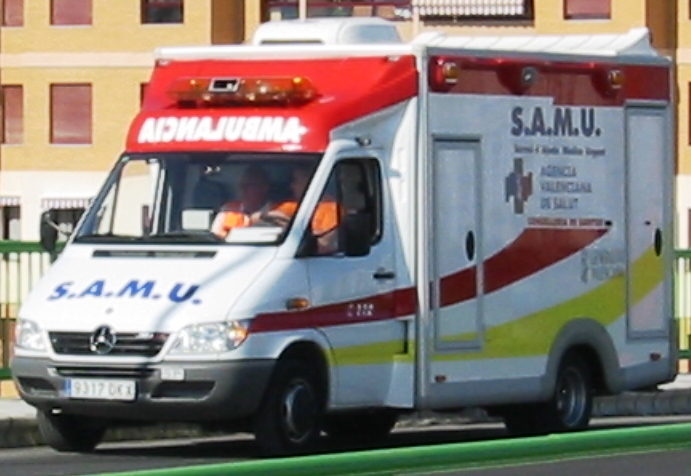
Autonomous Community of Valencia EMS. SAMU-ALS Ambulance

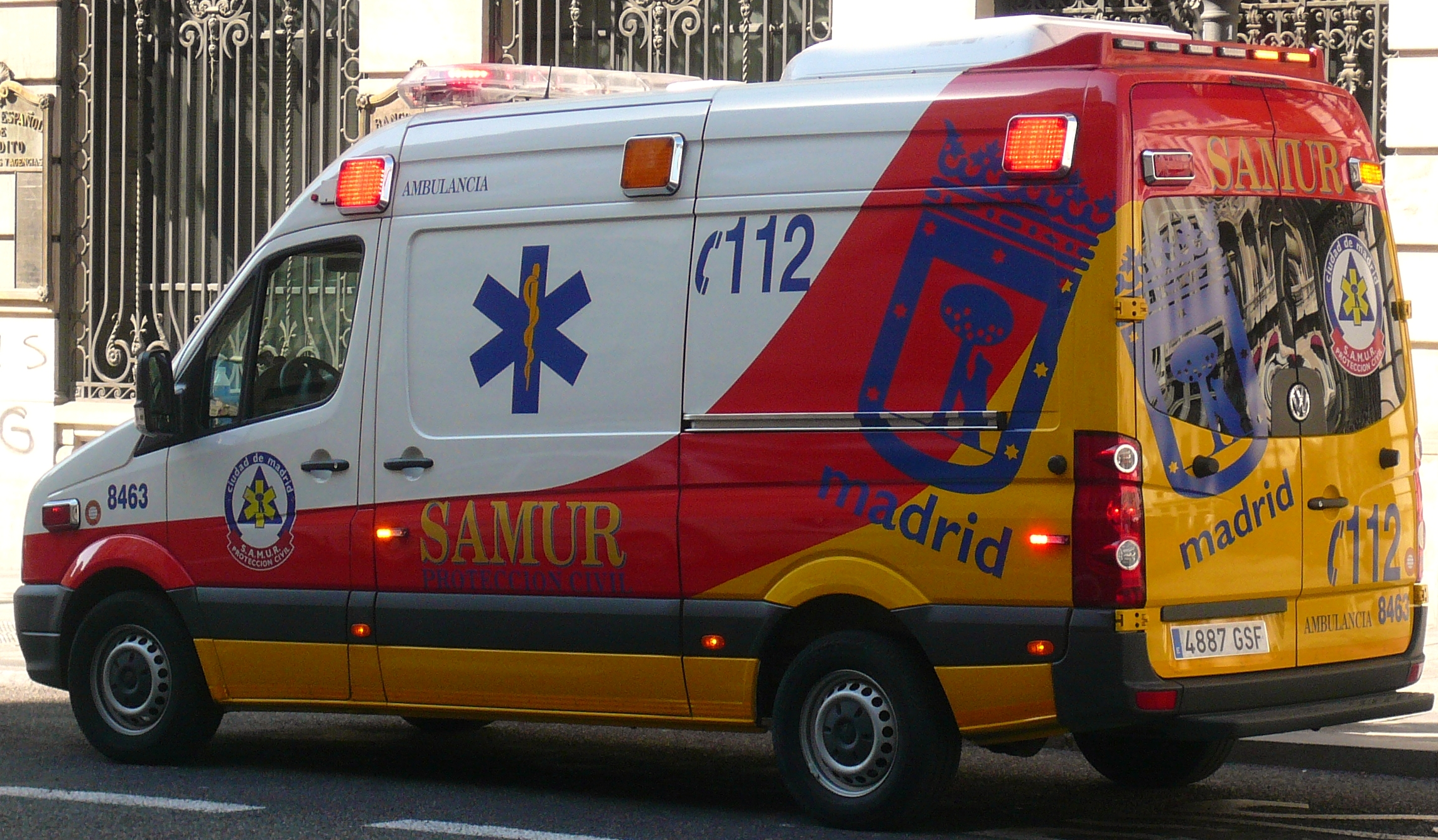
Madrid, city council EMS - SAMUR. BLS Ambulance

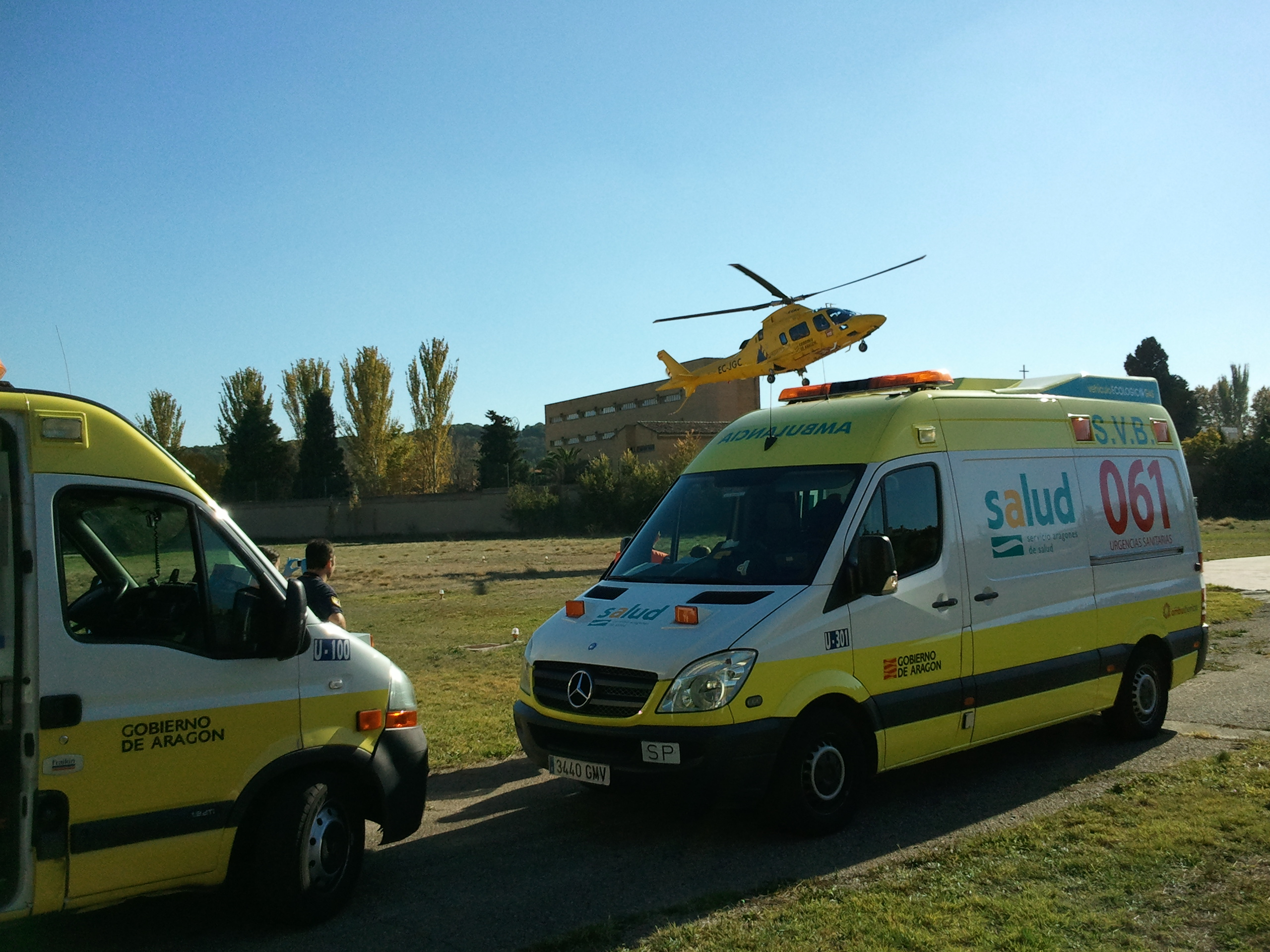
Autonomous Community of Aragon EMS. 061 ALS and BLS Ambulances, and 112 HEMS

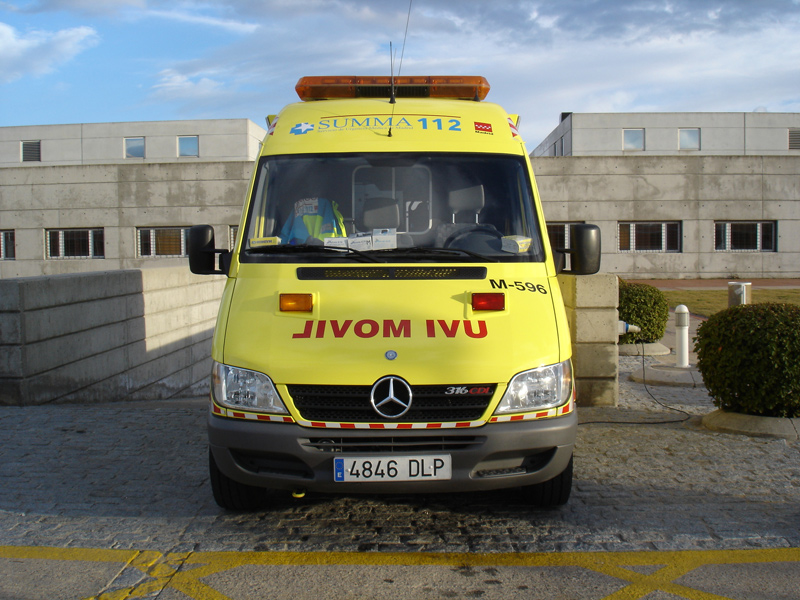
Autonomous Community of Madrid EMS. SUMMA 112-ALS Ambulance
Other EMS vehicles (non-ambulances)

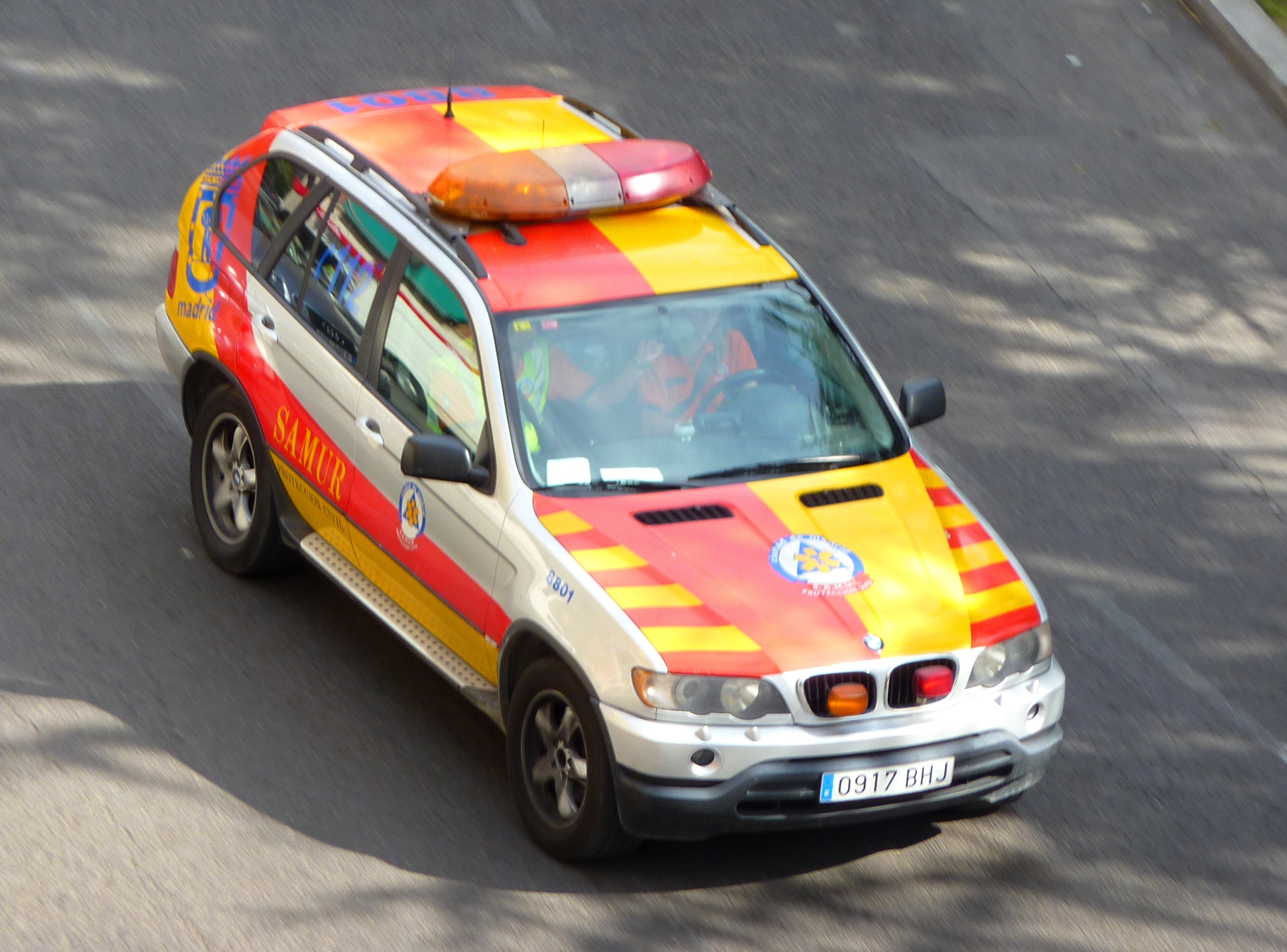
Madrid, city council EMS - SAMUR. Rapid Response Unit

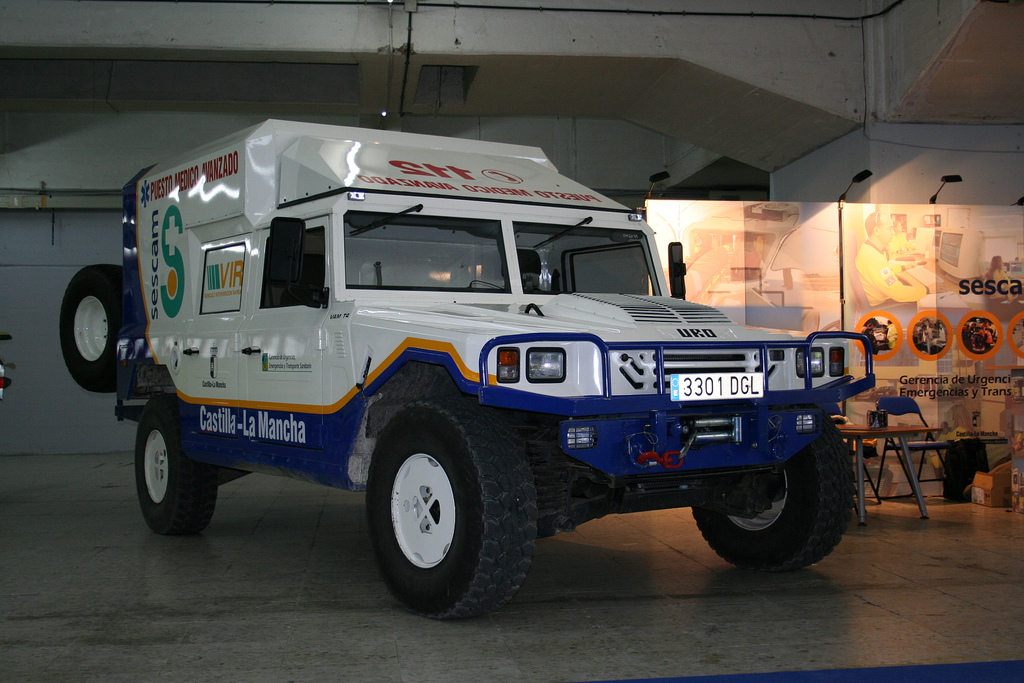
Castilla La Mancha EMS. Logistic vehicle-Mobile medical kit

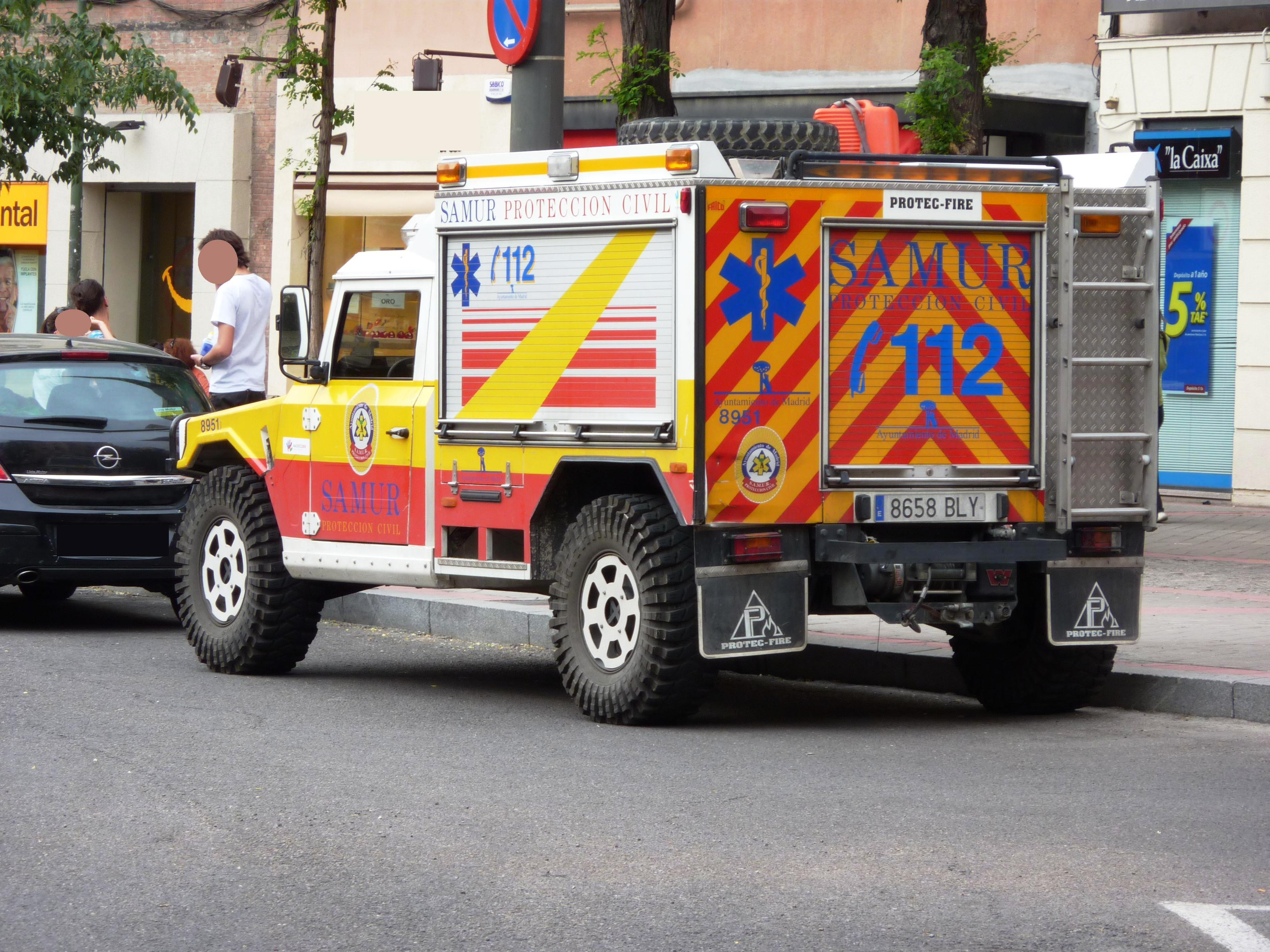
Madrid, city council EMS - SAMUR. Logistic vehicle
Non-profit organizations/volunteers

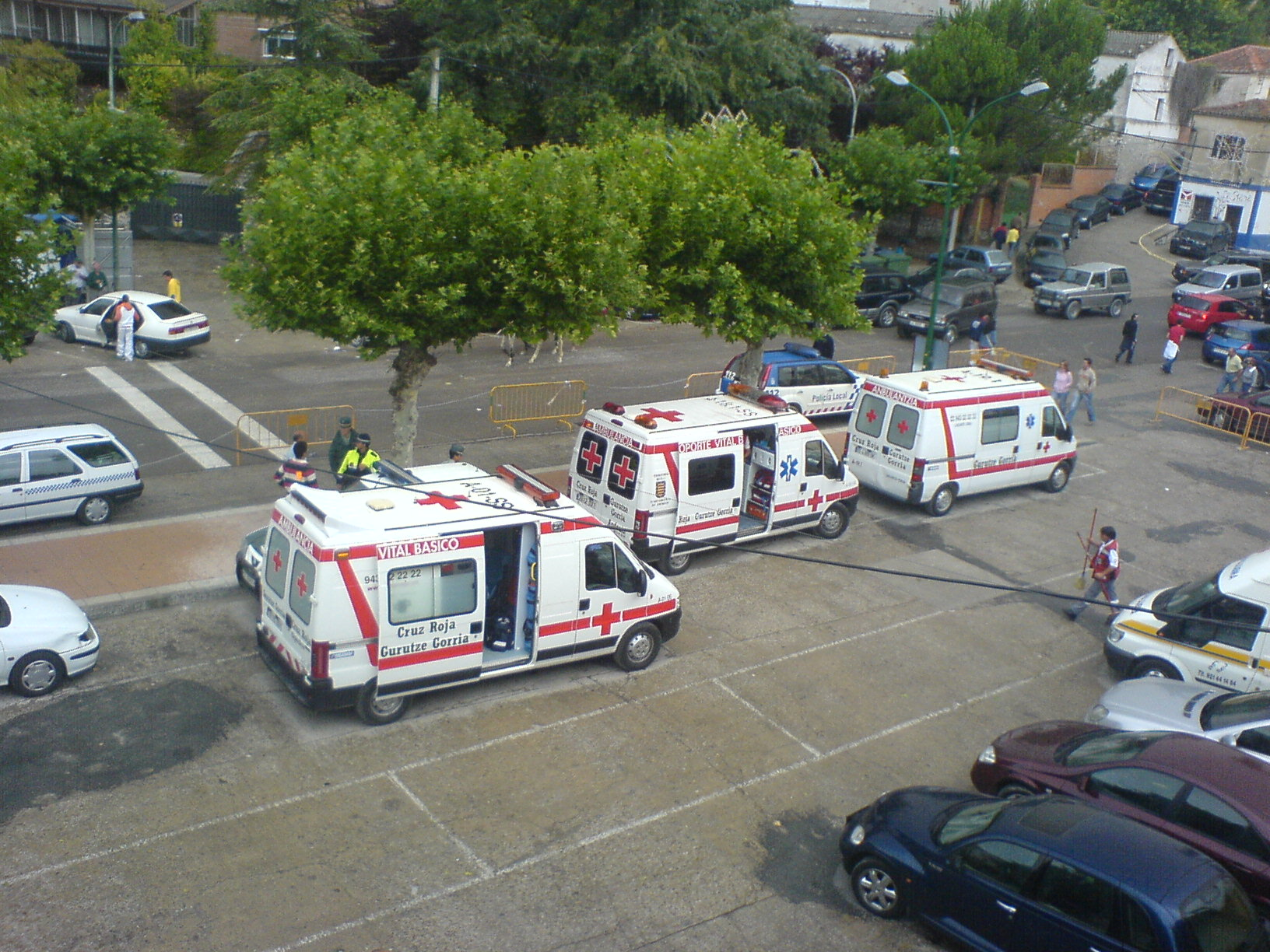
Spanish Red Cross Ambulances (volunteers)

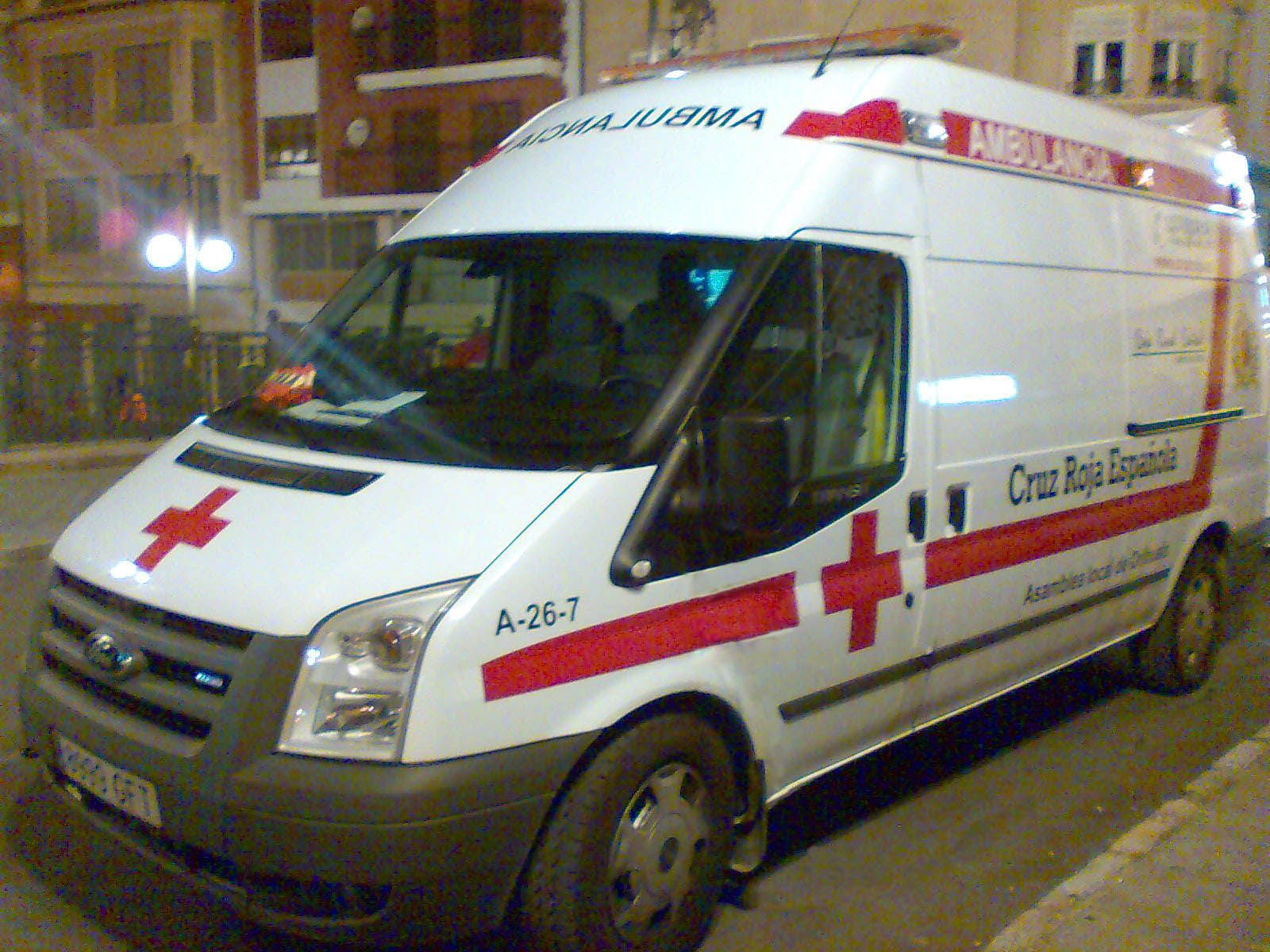
Spanish Red Cross Ambulance (volunteers)

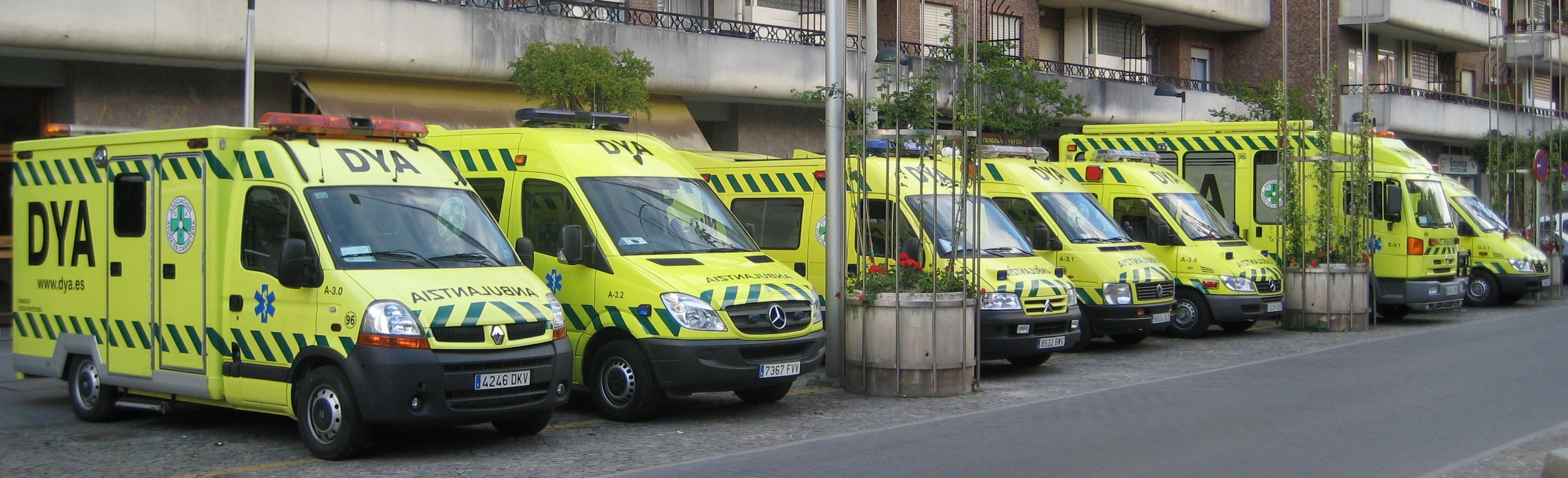
DYA Ambulances (volunteers)

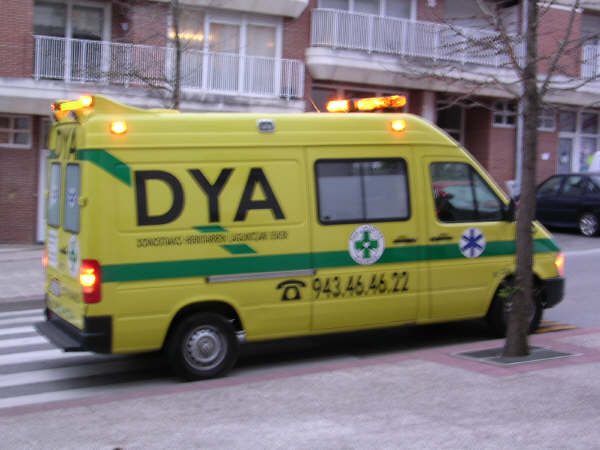
DYA Ambulance(volunteers)
Military Ambulances

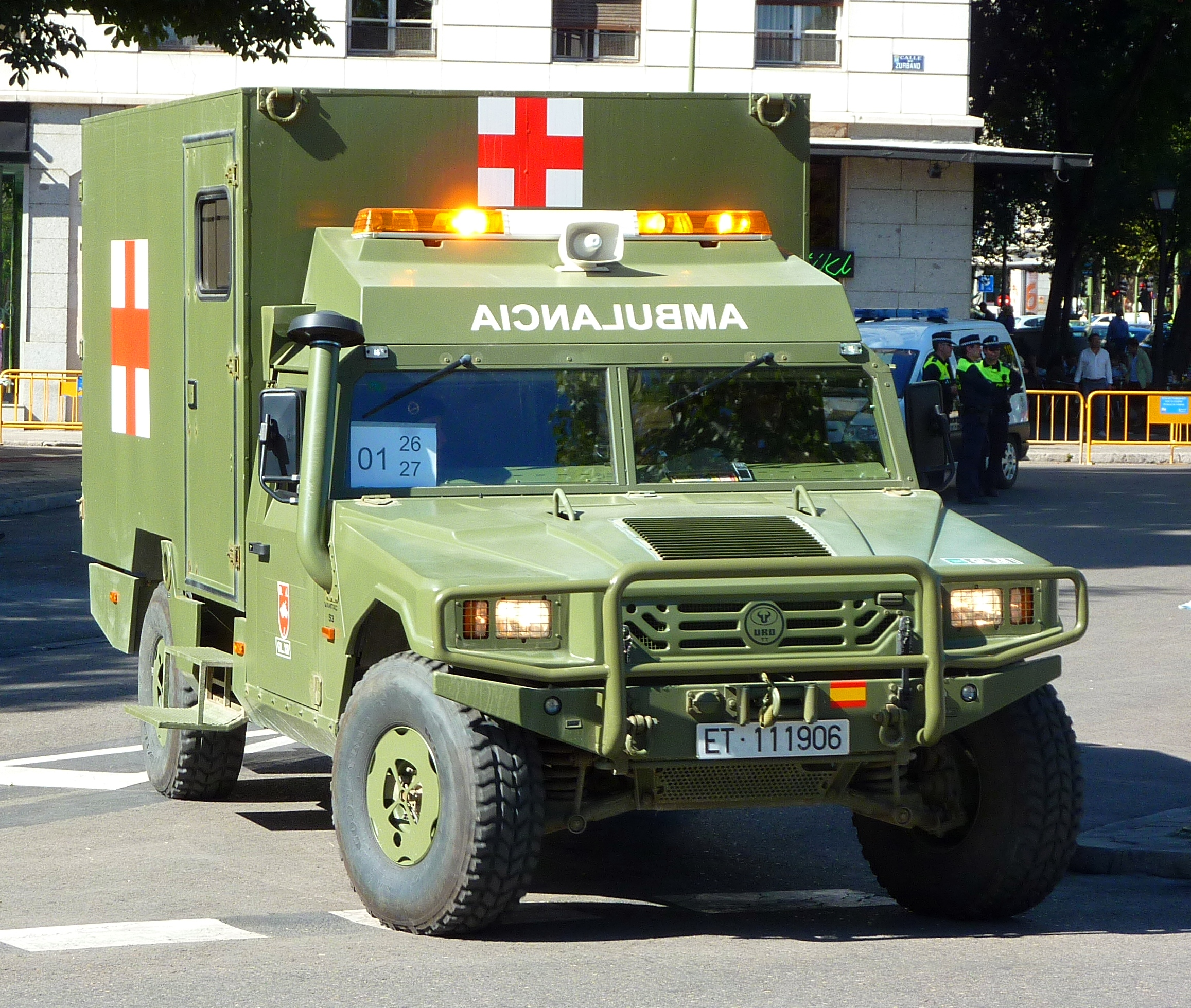
Military ambulance of the Spanish Army

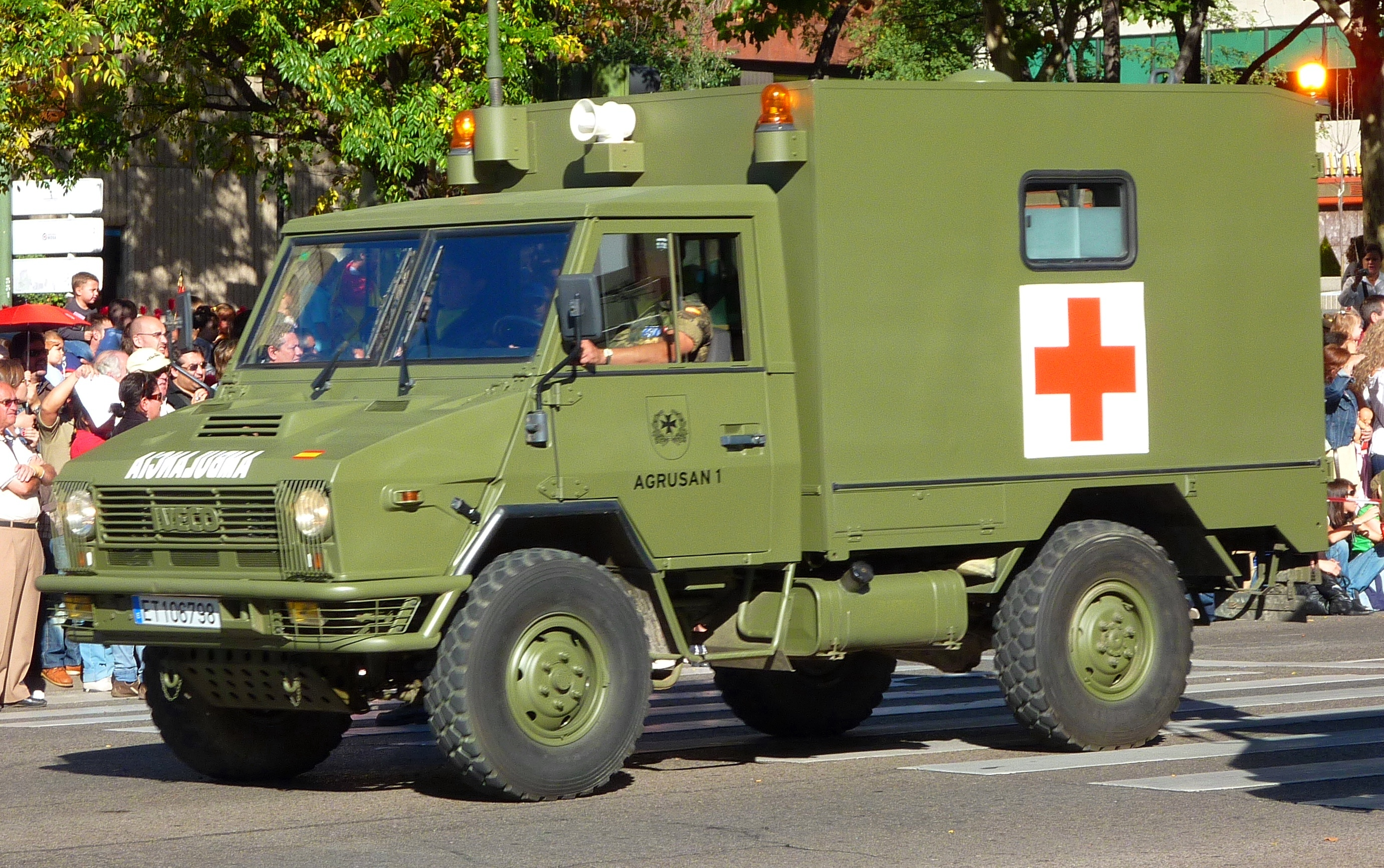
Military Ambulance of Spanish Army

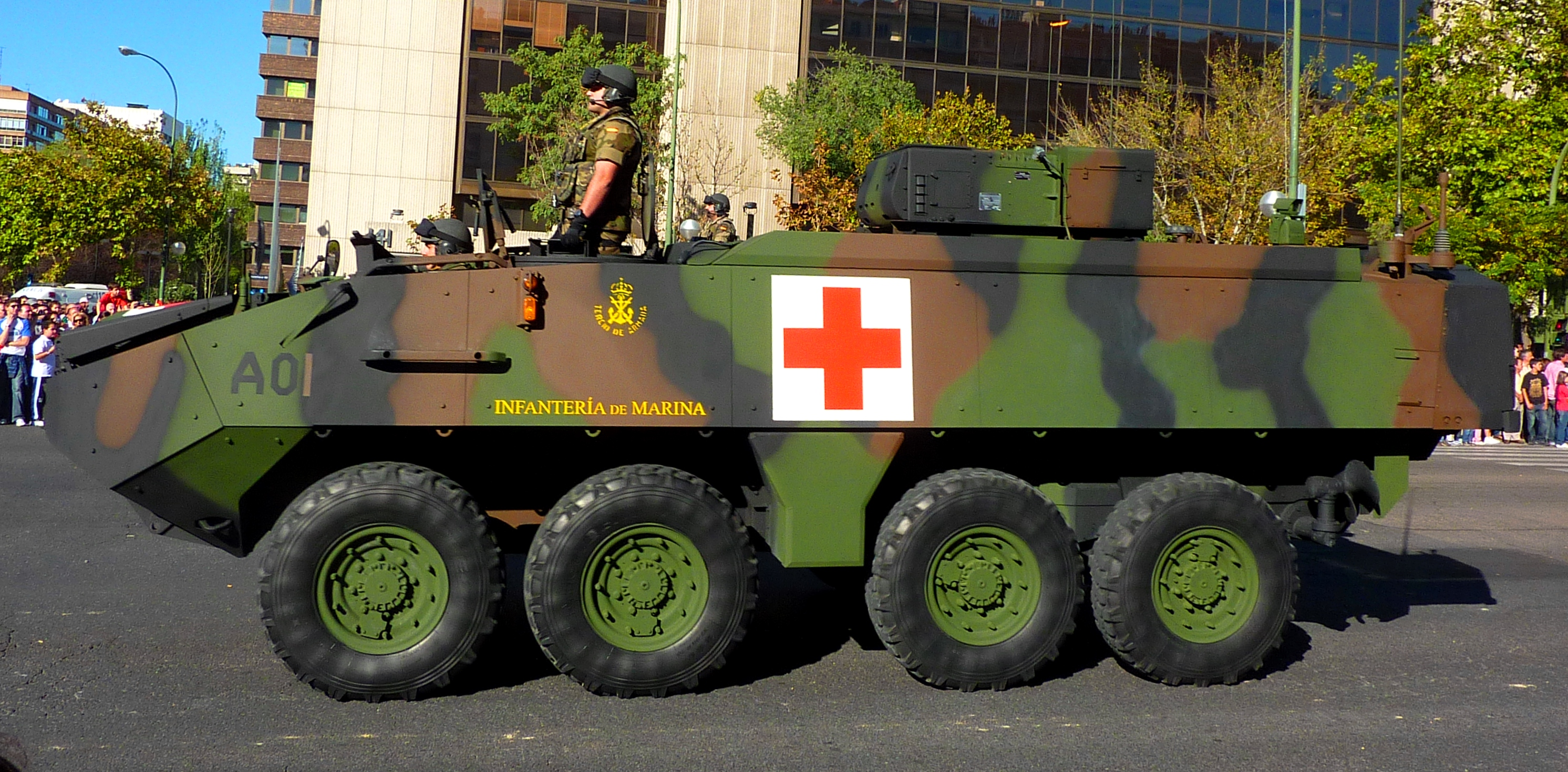
MOWAG Piranha IIIC ambulance of the Spanish Marines

=== Training ===
Profession	Level of education	Years	Postgraduate Education	Level of skills
Emergency Physician (Médico de Emergencias)	University (Degree in Medicine)	6 years	Master of Emergency Medicine (1–2 years), Medical Specialty (4–5 years): Cardiology, Anesthesiology, Family Medicine, Intensive Care Medicine,...	ALS
Emergency Nurse (Enfermero de Emergencias)	University (Degree in Nursing)	4 years	Master of Emergency Nursing (1–2 years) -optional in several regions. Nursing Specialty (2 years) (currently developing): Community nursing, Medical/Surgical Nursing,...	ALS
EMT/Emergency Medical Technician (EMT-basic) (TES/Técnico en Emergencias Sanitarias)	Vocational/Technical High Schools (since 2007)	2 years	-	BLS+AED
Patient Transport Assistant, Patient Transport Technician, rescuer, life guard (Auxiliar de Transporte Sanitario, Técnico de Transporte Sanitario, socorrista)	Non official education before 2007/Private courses/Red Cross Courses	4–8 weeks	-	First Aids

Before 2007 there was not a national standard for EMT (TES/Técnico en Emergencias Sanitarias) education, so each region had their own rules (courses from 60 to 600 hours or sometimes only a first aid course; no reciprocity between regions; different terms: TTS-Técnico de Transporte Sanitario, ATTS-Auxiliar de Transporte Sanitario, ATA-Auxiliar de Transporte en Ambulancia, TEM-Técnico en Emergencias Médicas,...). Since 2007 there is a 2 years training occupational course (vocational-Community College)

Spanish HEMS

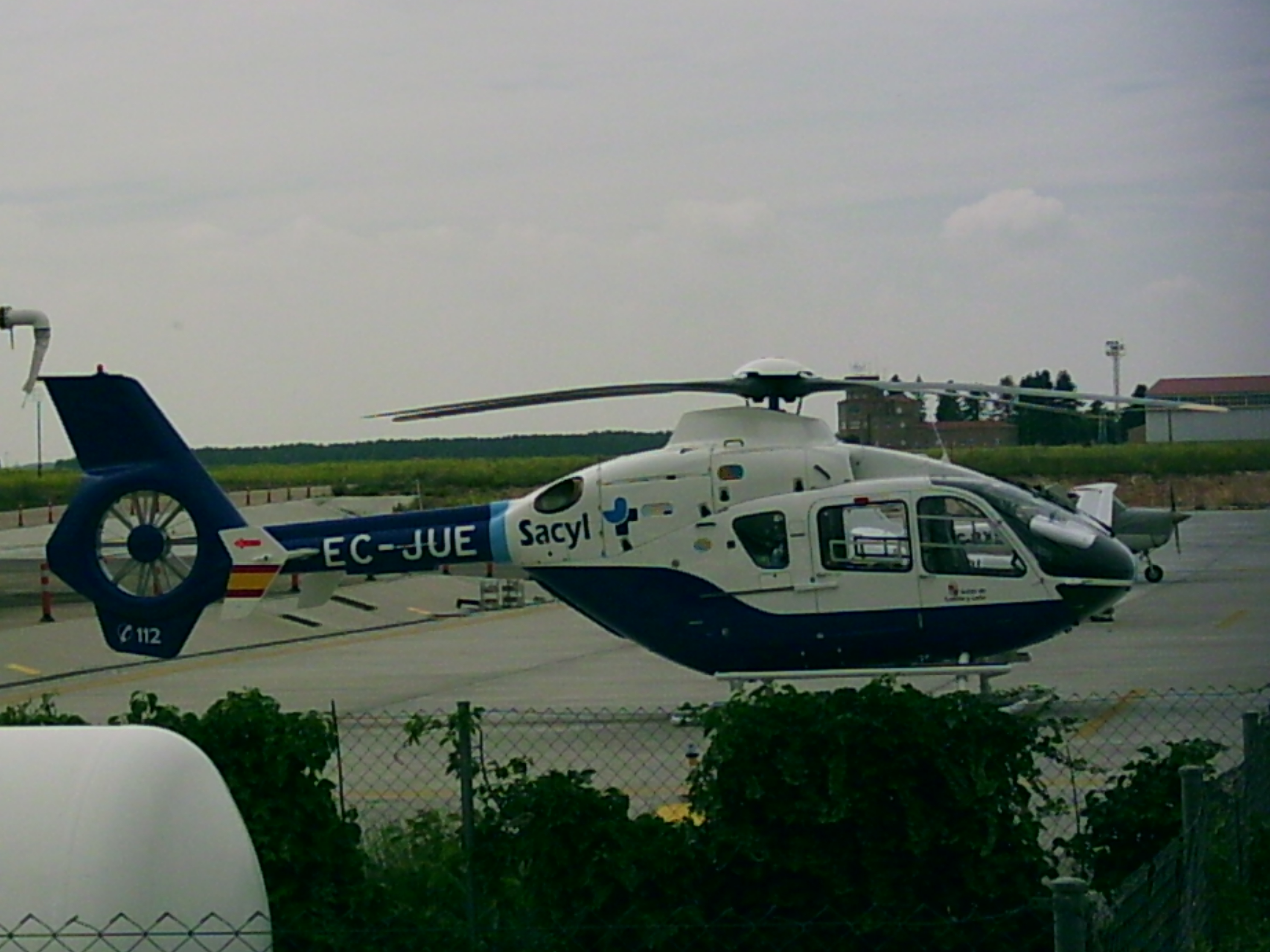
HEMS Castilla-Leon

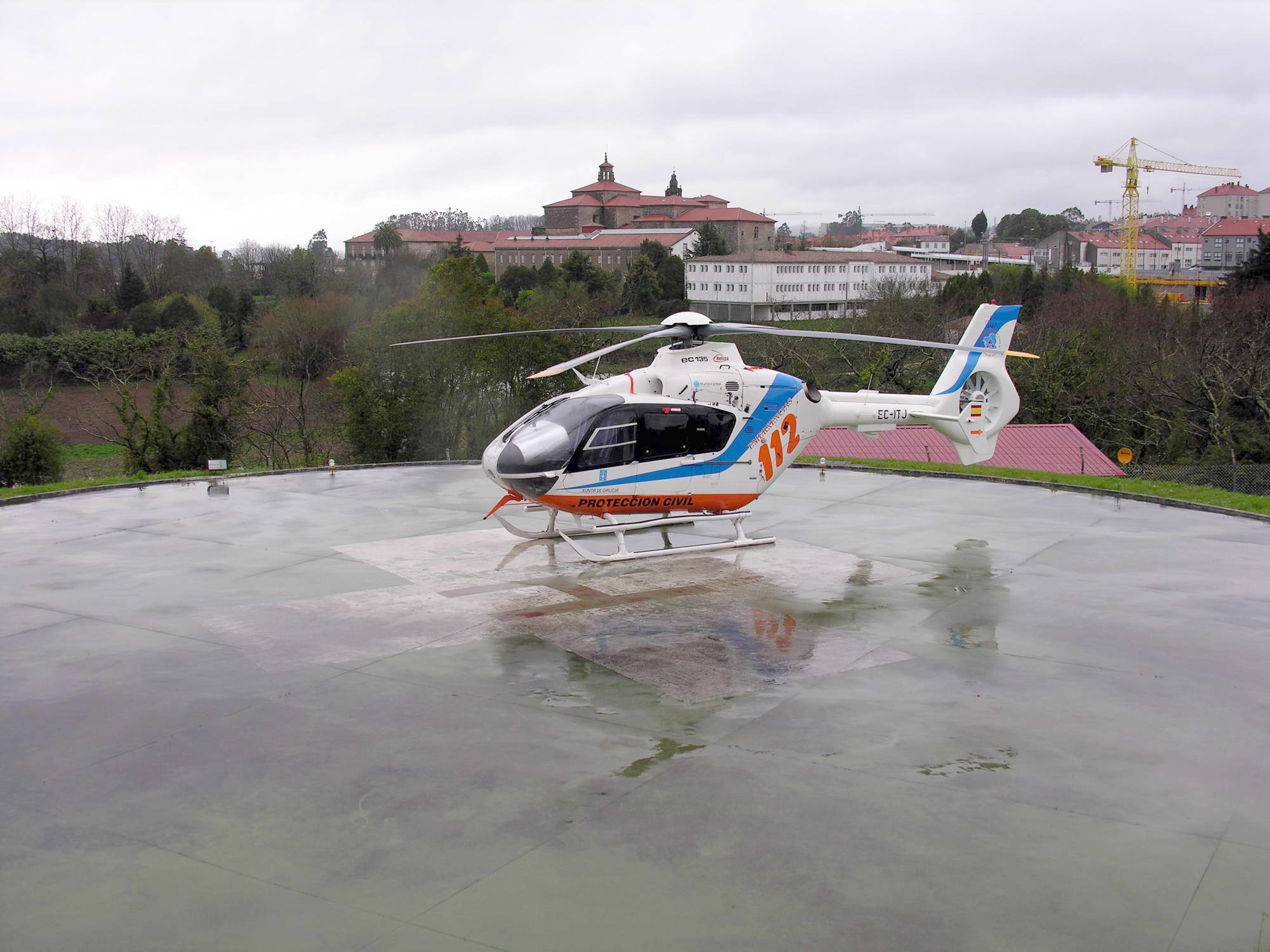
HEMS Galicia

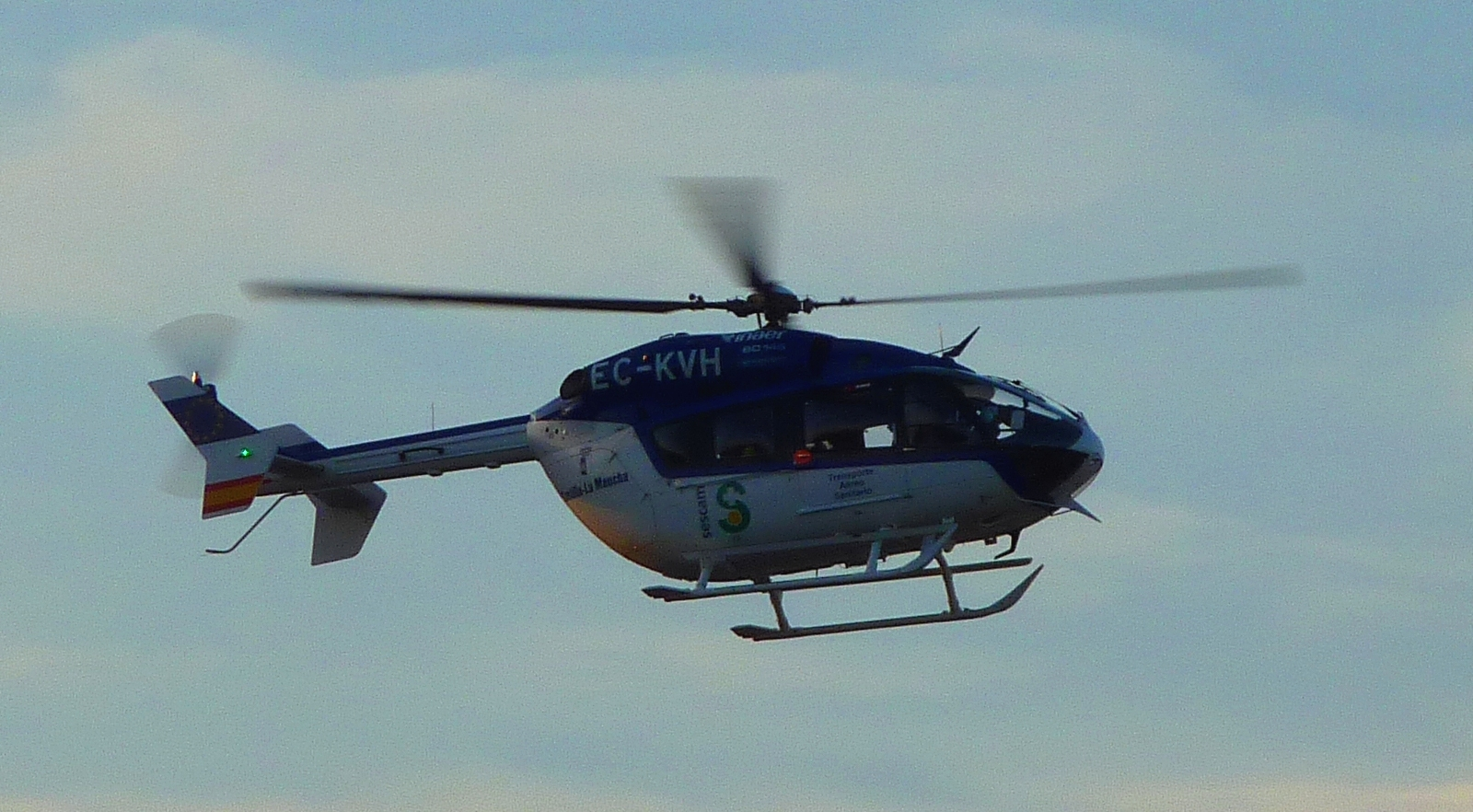
HEMS Castilla-La Mancha

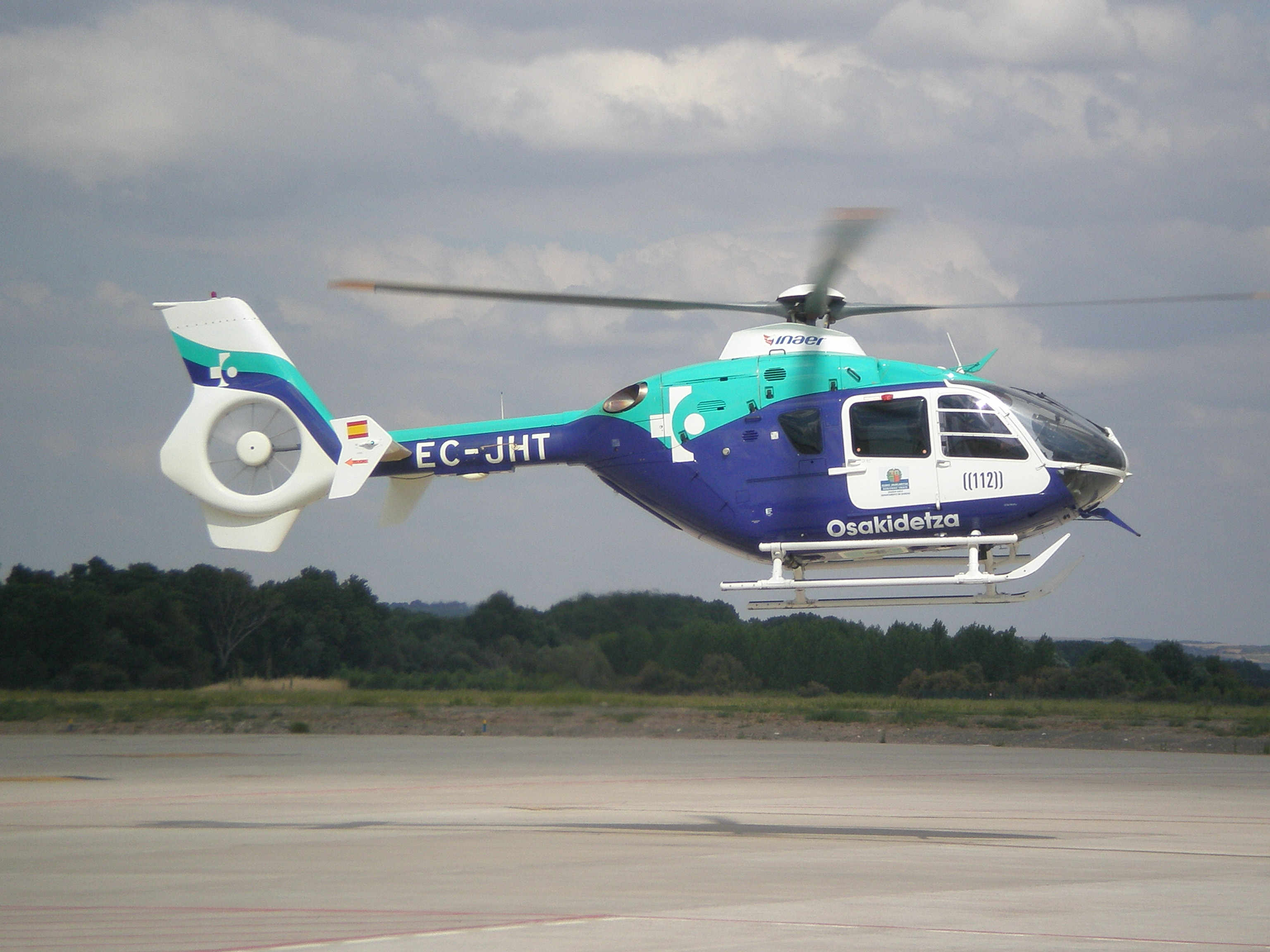
HEMS Basque Country

== Telephone number ==
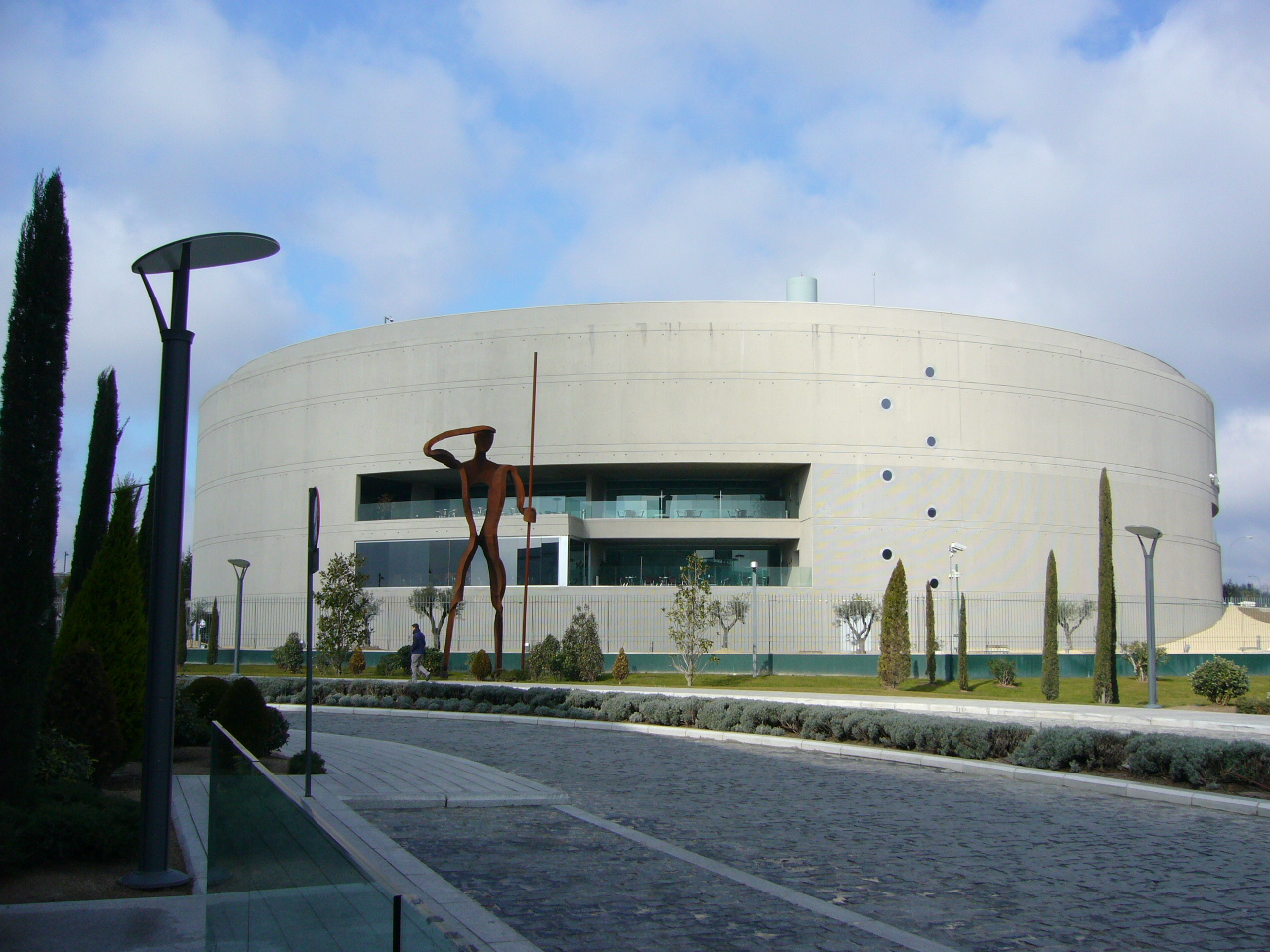
Madrid 112 Emergency Call Center Building

The emergency dial is 112 (European Emergency Number). in all regions. However, the emergency number for medical services, 061, is available in several regions.

In Spain, the emergency dispatch is a physician regulated system. Each region has its own emergency call center with phone operators (telefonistas), emergency medical dispatchers (gestores de recursos/coordinadores/locutores), medical-regulators (physician) and sometimes nurses.

== Curiosities ==
In Spain, until August, 1st 2018, the law (motor vehicle code) only allowed the police vehicles to use blue lights. Ambulances and fire engines had to use amber lights. However some ambulances used red/amber, white/amber, blue/amber, blue/red lights although this was illegal. Since that date, all emergency vehicles (police cars, ambulances, RRU, fire trucks,...) have to use blue lights. Vehicles that had amber lights have to change them within a maximum time period of two years.

== See also ==
- Spanish National Health System
