= SAMUR =

Specialized emergency system based in Madrid, Spain

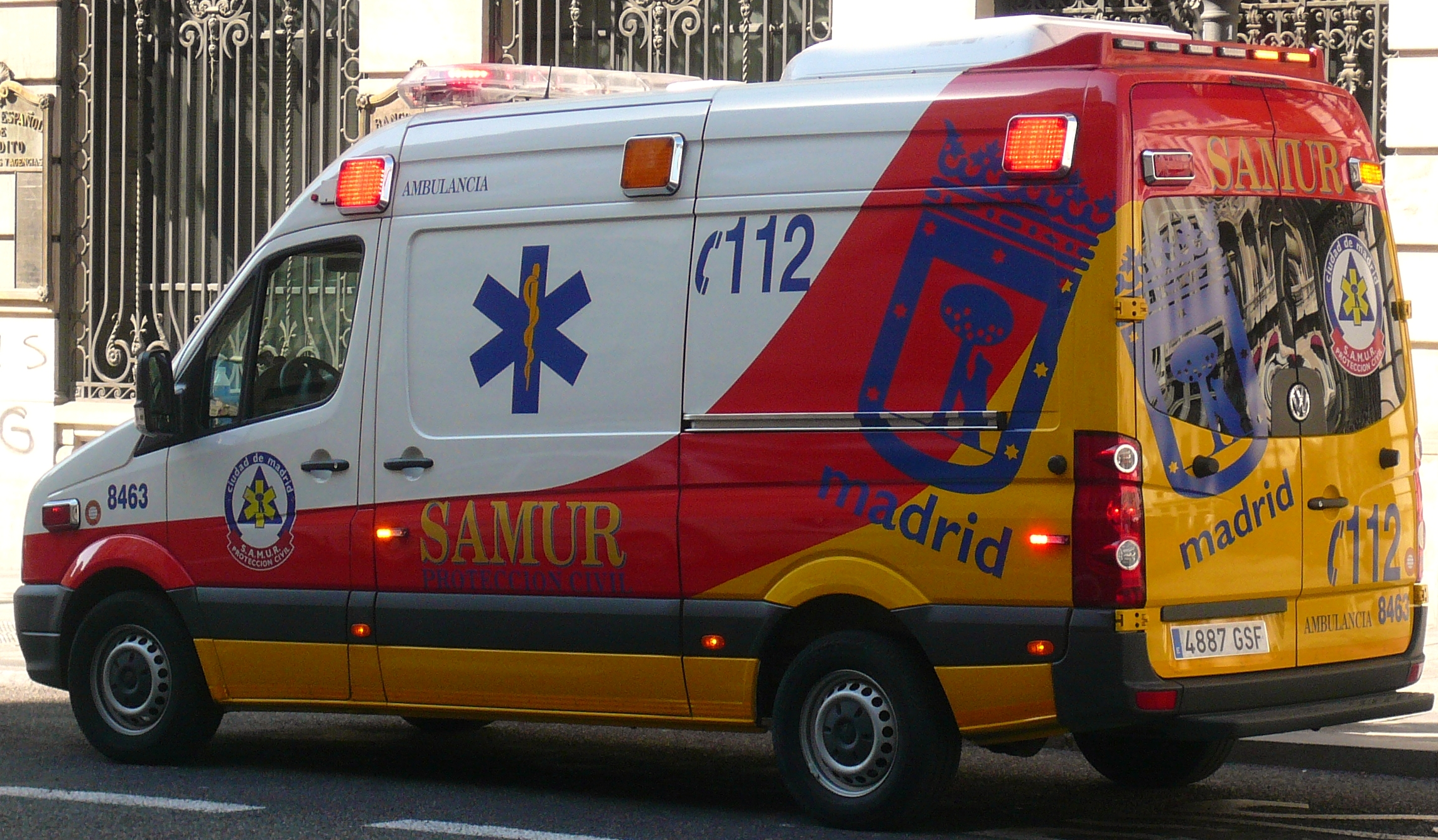
A SAMUR ambulance

SAMUR (Servicio de Asistencia Municipal de Urgencia y Rescate) is a specialized emergency system of Madrid, Spain. It is composed of the central base, 17 operative bases and 190 vehicles.

== History ==
The starting point and deployment of the original structure was created by Simón Viñals Pérez in 1989 (former Madrid Health Counselor from 1989 to 2003), under the presidency of Agustín Rodríguez Sahagún. The first director of SAMUR and a key figure in the development was José Luis Gilarranz. New uniforms were designed and better selection and learning methods introduced. The pilot project started in June 1991 with the help of the former Mayor of Madrid, José María Álvarez del Manzano.

Once the success of the pilot was achieved, in December 1992, the service started.

== Function ==
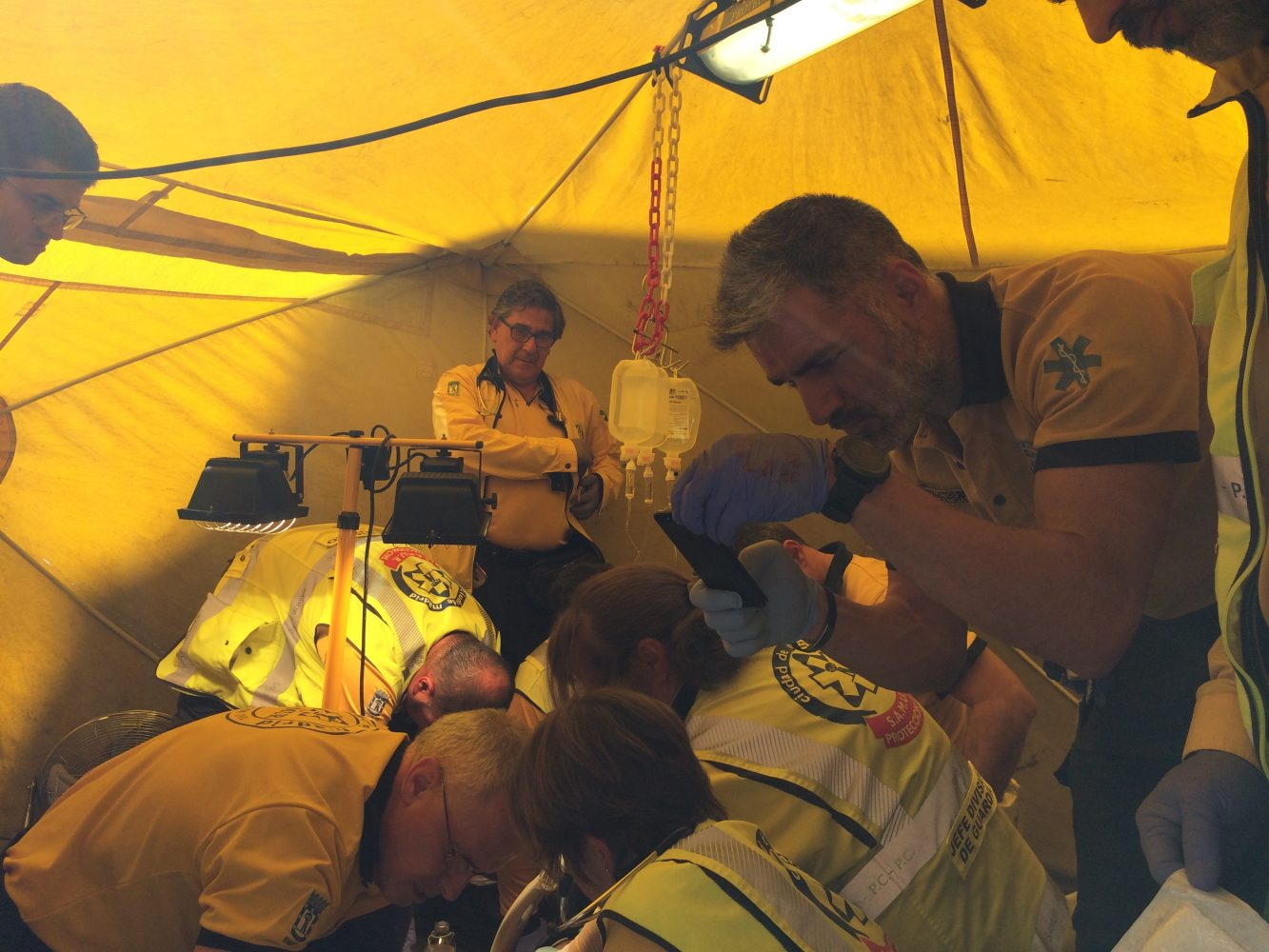
Members of SAMUR in a medical emergency.

The main objective is to solve efficiently the medical emergencies that could arise in the streets, inside the Madrid metropolitan area. Samur also assumes the leading role in the management of terrorist attacks or catastrophes. Their effort was remarkable in the terrorist events developed in Madrid on 11 March 2004, during the 2004 Madrid train bombings. They were also deployed to the accident involving Spanair Flight 5022.

== See also ==
- Emergency medical services in Spain
- SAMU
