= Margaret Samu =

Art historian specializing in Russian art

- Occupation: Art historian
- Awards: Mary Zirin Prize (2016)

Academic background
- Education: Wellesley College (BA); New York University (MA, PhD)

Academic work
- Discipline: Art history
- Sub-discipline: Russian art
- Institutions: Parsons School of Design

Margaret Samu is an art historian who specializes in the art and design of 18th- and 19th-century Russia. She teaches at The New School's Parsons School of Design and lectures at the Metropolitan Museum of Art in New York. She previously worked in the Russian and Slavic Studies Department at New York University, Stern College for Women, and in the City University of New York system.

Samu is an active member of the Society of Historians of East European, Eurasian, and Russian Art and Architecture, which she served as president from 2013 until 2015. She is a member of the Organizing Committee of the 19v Working Group on Nineteenth-Century Russian Culture, Literature, and the Arts, and co-organizes the 19v Art History Seminar.

Samu is a specialist in Russian art. In 2016, she was awarded the Mary Zirin Prize by the Association for Women In Slavic Studies.

== Education and career ==
Before attending university, Samu worked as a professional ballet dancer. Her experience of French and Russian ballet traditions contributed to her interest in nineteenth-century Russian culture.

Samu earned a bachelor's degree in art history and French from Wellesley College and a master's degree from the New York University Institute of Fine Arts. She completed her doctorate in art history at the institute in 2010. She has held adjunct teaching appointments at New York University and Stern College for Women at Yeshiva University, and has worked at the Metropolitan Museum of Art as a fellow, research assistant, translator and lecturer. She is a part-time associate teaching professor at Parsons School of Design.

In 2013, Samu helped revive the Society of Historians of East European, Eurasian, and Russian Art and Architecture (SHERA), alongside Yelena Kalinsky and Natasha Kurchanova. She served as the society's president from 2013 to 2015.

She is a member of the organizing committee of 19v, an interdisciplinary working group on nineteenth-century Russian culture hosted by NYU's Jordan Center for the Advanced Study of Russia, and co-organizes its Art History Seminar with Nikita Balagurov.

In 2016, Samu received the Mary Zirin Prize for independent scholarship from the Association for Women in Slavic Studies.

== Research ==
Samu's research on the female nude explores the collecting, production and reception of such images in eighteenth- and nineteenth-century Russia. In 2017, she was a writer-in-residence at the Jordan Center, where she presented research on the collecting and display of nudes from the reign of Peter the Great onwards.

With Rosalind Blakesley, she co-edited From Realism to the Silver Age: New Studies in Russian Artistic Culture (2014). The volume brings together thirteen essays on Russian art and was published in honour of art historian Elizabeth Kridl Valkenier.

She also guest-edited the forum "Russo-European Artistic Encounters in the Eighteenth Century" in volume 11 (2023) of Vivliofika, an academic journal of eighteenth-century Russian studies.

== Selected publications ==
- “Karl Briullov’s Last Day of Pompeii at the Paris Salon of 1834.” The Art Bulletin 103, no. 2 (June 2021). 77–103. DOI: 10.1080/00043079.2021.1847579
- “Exhibiting Westernization: Aleksei Venetsianov’s Nudes and the Russian Art Market 1820-1850.” Nineteenth-Century Studies 25 (2015). 131–147.
- “ ‘Serving Art…’ Artist and Model in the Nineteenth-Century Russia Art World.” Iskusstvoznanie. “ ‘Служа искусству…’ Художник и модель в русской художественной культуре XIX века.” Искусствознание] 3-4 (Autumn 2014). 434–447.
- From Realism to the Silver Age: New Studies in Russian Artistic Culture. DeKalb: Northern Illinois University Press, 2014 (co-editor and contributor).
- “Evelyn Beatrice Longman: Establishing a Career in Public Sculpture.” Woman's Art Journal 25, no. 2 (Fall 2004/Winter 2005). 8–15.
