= Samu Vilkman =

Finnish ice hockey player

- Born: April 11, 1986 (age 38); Hyvinkää, Finland
- Height: 6 ft 0 in (183 cm)
- Weight: 183 lb (83 kg; 13 st 1 lb)
- Position: Forward
- Shot: Left
- Played for: Lahti Pelicans; HIFK; Tappara
- NHL draft: Undrafted
- Playing career: 2004–2023

Samu Vilkman (born April 11, 1986) is a Finnish professional ice hockey player who currently plays professionally in Finland for Tappara of the SM-liiga.
