= Samu, South Khorasan =

Samu سمو
- Village
- Location within Iran
- Coordinates: 32°47′50″N 59°11′27″E
- Country: Iran
- Province: South Khorasan
- County: Birjand
- Bakhsh: Central
- Rural District: Baqeran

Population (2006)
  - Total: 13
- Time zone: UTC+3:30 (IRST)
  - Summer (DST): UTC+4:30 (IRDT)

Samu (Persian: سمو, also Romanized as Samū and Samoo; also known as Sīmu) is a village in Baqeran Rural District, in the Central District of Birjand County, South Khorasan Province, Iran. At the 2006 census, its population was 13, in 4 families.
